= Battle of Arcole order of battle =

In the Battle of Arcole on 15 to 17 November 1796, the French Army of Italy commanded by Napoleon Bonaparte won a victory over the army of Austria led by Jozsef Alvinczi. The battle was part of the third relief of the Siege of Mantua in which Alvinczi's army repulsed Bonaparte at the Second Battle of Bassano on 6 November and at the Battle of Caldiero on 12 November. Meanwhile, Paul Davidovich's Austrian Tyrol Corps clashed with Claude Vaubois' French division at Cembra on 2 November. Davidovich defeated Vaubois at the Battle of Calliano on 6–7 November and Rivoli Veronese on 17 November. After Bonaparte's triumph at Arcola, he turned on the Tyrol Corps, beat it at Rivoli on 21 November, and forced it to retreat north into the mountains.

== French Army ==
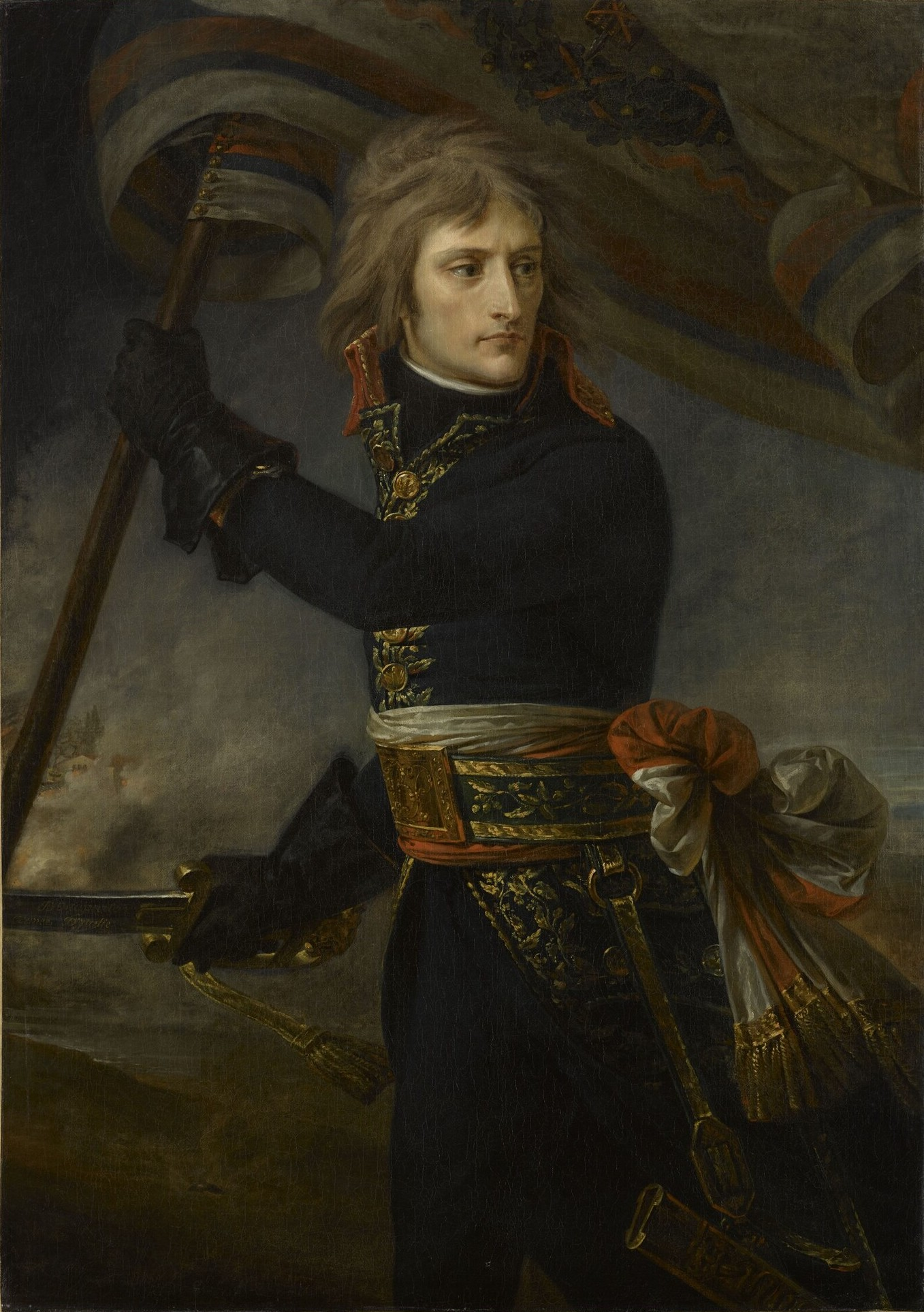
Napoleon Bonaparte

- Army of Italy: Napoleon Bonaparte (41,560)
  - Division: André Masséna (9,540 including 2 cavalry regiments)
    - Brigade: Philippe Romaine Ménard
    - Brigade: Antoine-Guillaume Rampon
    - Brigade: Honoré Vial
    - Brigade: Jean Joseph Magdeleine Pijon
    - Brigade: Charles Leclerc
  - Division: Pierre Augereau (8,340 including 1 cavalry regiment)
    - Brigade: Jean-Antoine Verdier
    - Brigade: Louis André Bon
    - Brigade: Jean Lannes
  - Division: Claude-Henri Belgrand de Vaubois (10,500)
    - Brigade: Jean Joseph Guieu
    - Brigade: Pascal Antoine Fiorella
    - Brigade: Gaspard Amédée Gardanne
  - Division: Charles Edward Jennings de Kilmaine (8,830 including 1 cavalry regiment)
    - Brigade: Louis Chabot
    - Brigade: Claude Dallemagne
    - Brigade: Thomas Sandos
    - Brigade: Claude Lebley
    - Brigade: Nicolas Bertin
  - Division: François Macquard (2,750 including 1 cavalry regiment)
  - Cavalry Reserve: Thomas-Alexandre Dumas (1,600 in 6 cavalry regiments)

== Austrian Army ==
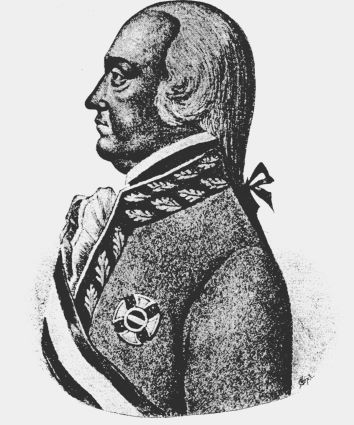
József Alvinczi

- Field Army: Feldzeugmeister József Alvinczi (c. 51,000, not including Wurmser)
  - Friaul Corps: Feldmarschall-Leutnant Peter Quasdanovich (28,699)
    - Advance Guard and Reserve:
      - Advance Guard: General-major Prince Friedrich Franz Xaver of Hohenzollern-Hechingen (4,397)
      - Reserve Brigade: General-major Philipp Pittoni von Dannenfeld (4,376)
    - Main Body, 1st Line: Feldmarschall-Leutnant Giovanni Marchese di Provera (9,380)
      - Brigade: General-major Gerhard Rosselmini †
      - Brigade: General-major Anton Lipthay de Kisfalud
    - Main Body, 2nd Line: Feldmarschall-Leutnant Provera (8,279)
      - Brigade: General-major Anton Schübirz von Chobinin
      - Brigade: General-major Adolf Brabeck †
    - Independent Brigade: General-major Anton Ferdinand Mittrowsky (c. 3,000)
  - Tyrol Corps: Feldmarschall-Leutnant Paul Davidovich (19,476)
    - Brigade 1: General-major Johann Ludwig Alexius von Loudon (4,277)
    - Brigade 2: General-major Joseph Ocskay von Ocsko (4,663)
    - Brigade 3: General-major Johann Rudolf von Sporck (2,560)
    - Brigades 4 & 5: General-major Josef Philipp Vukassovich (6,880)
    - Brigade 6: Oberstleutnant Seulen (1,096)
- Mantua Garrison: Feldmarschall Dagobert von Wurmser (23,708 of whom only 12,240 were fit for service)
