= Philipp Pittoni von Dannenfeld =

Austrian general (died 1824)

- Died: 6 October 1824 Gorizia, Austrian Empire
- Allegiance: Habsburg monarchy
- Rank: General-major
- Conflicts: French Revolutionary Wars; Battle of Monte Settepani; Battle of Loano; Battle of Voltri; Battle of Borghetto; Battle of Castiglione; Second Battle of Bassano; Battle of Arcole

Philipp Pittoni Freiherr von Dannenfeld (died 6 October 1824), fought in the army of Habsburg Austria during the French Revolutionary Wars. Promoted to general officer in 1795, he was a brigade commander in northwestern Italy at the time when Napoleon Bonaparte was appointed to lead the opposing French Army of Italy. Pittoni led one of the two main columns at Voltri in April 1796. At Borghetto in May, he unsuccessfully defended the bridge. He led a brigade at Castiglione in August and at Second Bassano and Arcole in November 1796. At the beginning of the Italian campaign of 1796–1797, Pittoni von Dannenfeld was in his 70s. He retired from service the following year (1797) and died at Gorizia in 1824.

== Early career ==
Pittoni was appointed Oberst (colonel) of Infantry Regiment Alvinczi Nr. 19 in 1789. The previous Oberst was Johann Kollowrat. He was promoted Generalmajor on 1 May 1795 to date from 21 March 1794. His successor as Oberst was Carl von Adorjan. During the Battle of Monte Settepani from 24 June to 7 July 1795, Pittoni led a brigade in Johann von Wenckheim's division that consisted of Infantry Regiments Alvinczi Nr. 19 (2 battalions), Brechainville Nr. 25 (1 battalion), and Lattermann Nr. 45 (2 battalions). During the retreat after the Battle of Loano on 23–24 November 1795, Pittoni was ordered to lead an artillery and wagon train convoy across the Colle di San Giacomo. The road was not properly guarded, and the convoy was blocked by a French force led by Barthélemy Joubert. Calling a council of war, Pittoni asked his officers if they should fight their way through, but they voted to wait for further instructions. By the time, orders to withdraw arrived, a second French force blocked the road behind them. The Austrians escaped by moving cross-country, after abandoning 48 guns and 100 carts.

== Montenotte Campaign ==
In early 1796, Johann Peter Beaulieu was the newly appointed commander of the combined armies of Habsburg Austria and the Kingdom of Sardinia-Piedmont. Beaulieu's left wing consisted of 19,500 troops. Half of these were on garrison duty, while the rest were led by Pittoni and Josef Philipp Vukassovich. The 11,500-man Austrian right wing was posted to cover Acqui Terme and was commanded by Eugène-Guillaume Argenteau. The 20,000 Piedmontese troops were led by Michelangelo Alessandro Colli-Marchi and included an Austrian contingent under Giovanni Marchese di Provera. Colli's men were strung out in a chain from Cosseria Castle in the east to Cuneo in the west. Further west, the 20,000 Piedmontese under the Prince of Corrigan were faced by François Christophe de Kellermann's Army of the Alps.

According to one authority, on 1 April 1796, Pittoni's 7-battalion brigade was stationed near Alessandria and belonged to Karl Philipp Sebottendorf's wing of Beaulieu's Austrian army. Another authority asserted that he led a division-sized command that include the Reisky Infantry Regiment Nr. 13 (3 battalions), Nádasdy Infantry Regiment Nr. 39 (2 battalions), Terzi Infantry Regiment Nr. 16 (1 battalion), Lattermann Infantry Regiment Nr. 45 (1 battalion), and Szluiner Grenz Infantry Regiment Nr. 63 (1 battalion). (Note: Pivka provided the regiment numbers only (Pivka, pp. 82–84).)

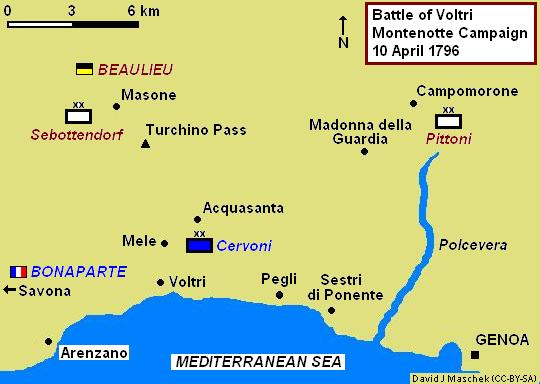
Map shows the Battle of Voltri on 10 April 1796. Pittoni's division began its march at Campomorone and engaged the French near Pegli.

Because the neutral Republic of Genoa had refused to loan the French money, the representative-on-mission Antoine Christophe Saliceti asked the French army commander Barthélemy Louis Joseph Scherer for 6,000 men to advance in order to intimidate the civic authorities. On 27 March, Pittoni reported to Beaulieu about the movement of these troops to Voltri. Bonaparte, who had just taken command, ordered the movement halted the next day. At first he wanted to withdraw the exposed unit, but later decided to hold the position at Voltri. To counter this threat, on 31 March, Beaulieu ordered Pittoni in invade the Republic of Genoa and cross the Bocchetta Pass. Pittoni occupied Novi Ligure with 2,800 men and started his men on the road up the pass. The Lattermann Regiment was left to guard Novi. Beaulieu apparently was on hand because he noted that the weather was uncomfortably cold and that Pittoni was not well, though he did his soldierly duty. The army commander sent one 12-pound cannon, one 6-pound cannon, and two 7-pound howitzers to join Pittoni's force. By 8 April, Pittoni was in position at the Bocchetta Pass but informed Beaulieu that he was so isolated that it would take him six hours of marching over bad roads to link with Vukassovich near Masone.

On 10 April 1796, Pittoni's column advanced with four squadrons of the Mészáros Uhlans, two battalions of the Reisky Regiment, and one battalion each of the Terzi, Nádasdy, and Szluiner Regiments. Pittoni's force numbered 3,350 infantry and 624 cavalry. (Note: Smith stated that the Uhlans belonged to the Mészáros Regiment (Smith, p. 111)) The troops got a remarkably late start. At 8:00 AM, 250 volunteers set out to cover the right flank by marching via the mountaintop Madonna della Guardia. The main column left Campomorone at 11:00 AM and marched down to the coast before turning right through Sestri di Ponente. Pittoni's Szluiner battalion and the volunteers attacked the French 75th Line Infantry Demi-Brigade near Pegli at 3:00 PM in the Battle of Voltri. After a three-hour fight, the 75th Line withdrew. That evening Pittoni occupied Voltri with three battalions and the cavalry. He was joined at midnight by Beaulieu, who came via Masone and the Turchino Pass with Sebottendorf and Vukassovich. The Austrians lost about 50 casualties while the French reported losing 16 dead, 45 wounded, and 148 captured.

The remaining actions of the Montenotte Campaign went badly for the Austrians. They lost the Battle of Montenotte on 11 and 12 April and the Second Battle of Dego on 14 and 15 April. Soon after, the Piedmontese were defeated at the Battle of Mondovì on 22 April, their government sued for peace.

== Borghetto to Arcole ==
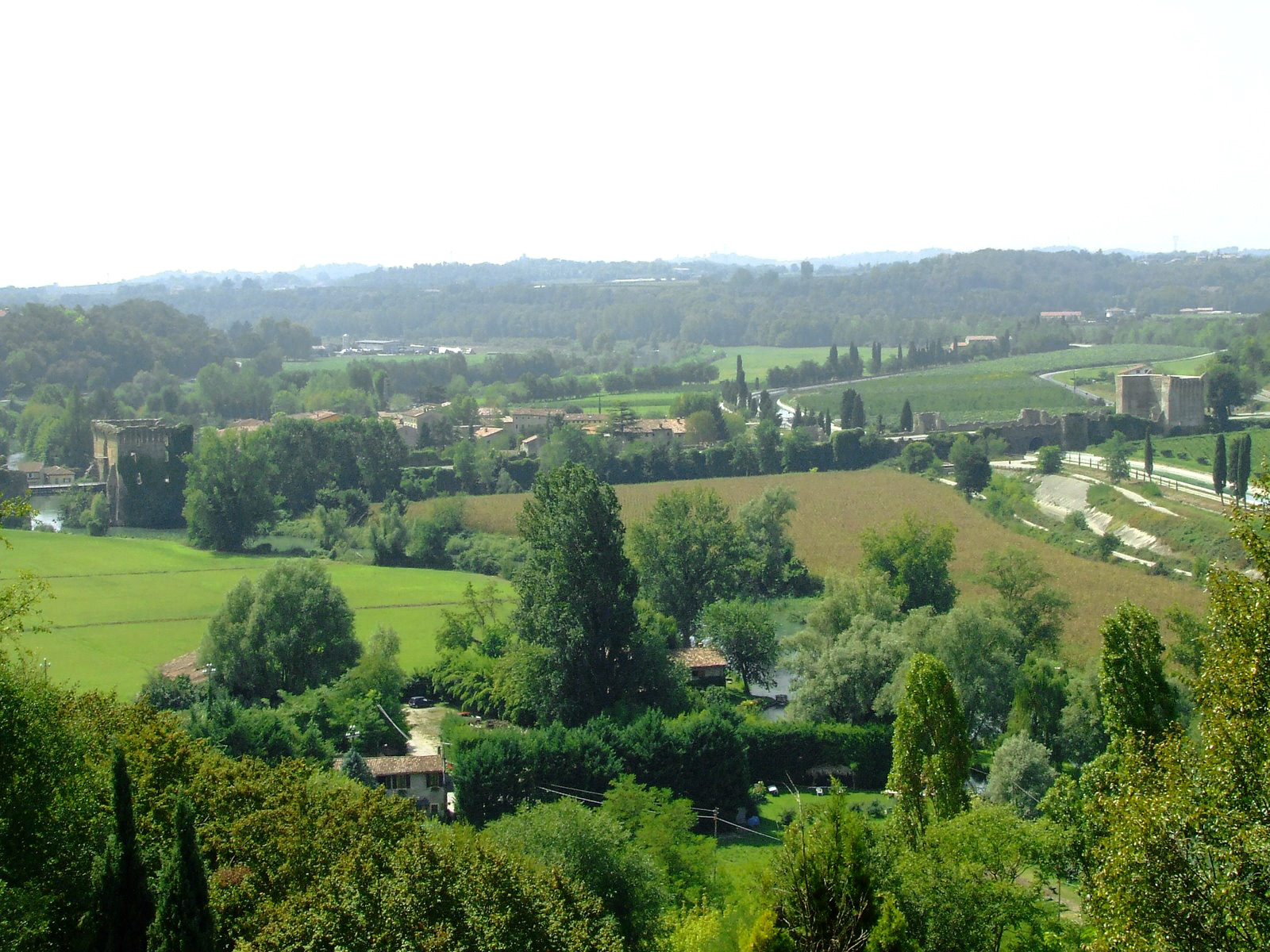
This view shows the western approaches to the Borghetto bridge which is at the far left of the photo. The Mincio can be seen amid the trees in the foreground.

Pittoni's brigade held a position near Gropello Cairoli in early May. He missed the Battle of Lodi on 10 May 1796 since he was marching with Beaulieu via the village of Acquanegra Cremonese toward Cremona. When the Austrians formed a defense line behind the Mincio River, Sebottendorf placed Pittoni's brigade and Prince di Cuto's Neapolitan cavalry near Valeggio sul Mincio. At 7:00 AM on the morning of 30 May 1796, the division of Charles Edward Jennings de Kilmaine attacked the Austrian cavalry outposts on the west side of the Mincio to open the Battle of Borghetto. By 9:00 AM the French reached the Borghetto bridge on the west side of Valeggio and put great pressure on the one battalion each from the Strassoldo Infantry Regiment Nr. 27 and Jordis Infantry Regiment Nr. 59. Pittoni arrived to direct the fighting, but no reserves arrived. By noon, the Austrians ran low on ammunition and withdrew to Valeggio. The French followed and pushed them out of the town as well. To face Kilmaine's 1,500 cavalry and six battalions of grenadiers, Pittoni only had half of the 920 men from the two battalion Strassoldo Regiment and 761 soldiers from the Jordis Regiment.

When the new Austrian army commander Dagobert Sigmund von Wurmser advanced to the relief of the Siege of Mantua in late July, he formed his forces into four columns. See the Castiglione 1796 Campaign Order of Battle. The Right-Center Column was led by Michael von Melas and comprised the brigades of Peter Gummer, Adam Bajalics von Bajahaza, Franz Nicoletti, and Pittoni. The latter two reported to Sebottendorf. (Note: Fiebeger spelled it Kummer instead of Gummer (Fiebeger, p. 38).) While Melas led Gummer and Bajalics over Monte Baldo by footpaths, Sebottendorf's two brigades fought their way down the road through Ferrara di Monte Baldo and Brentino Belluno. They accomplished their mission by driving back the French so that the Left-Center Column under Paul Davidovich could join them via the Adige River valley. The 900-man 11th Light Infantry Demi-Brigade and four guns were isolated and captured during the successful operation. Pittoni and Sebottendorf are not specifically mentioned in a detailed account of the Battle of Castiglione on 5 August 1796. In a preliminary action on 3 August, 1,000 Austrians became casualties and Pittoni's fellow brigadier Nicoletti was wounded. On the 5th, the Austrians were beaten with losses of 2,000 killed and wounded plus 1,000 men and 20 guns captured. The French counted 1,100 casualties.

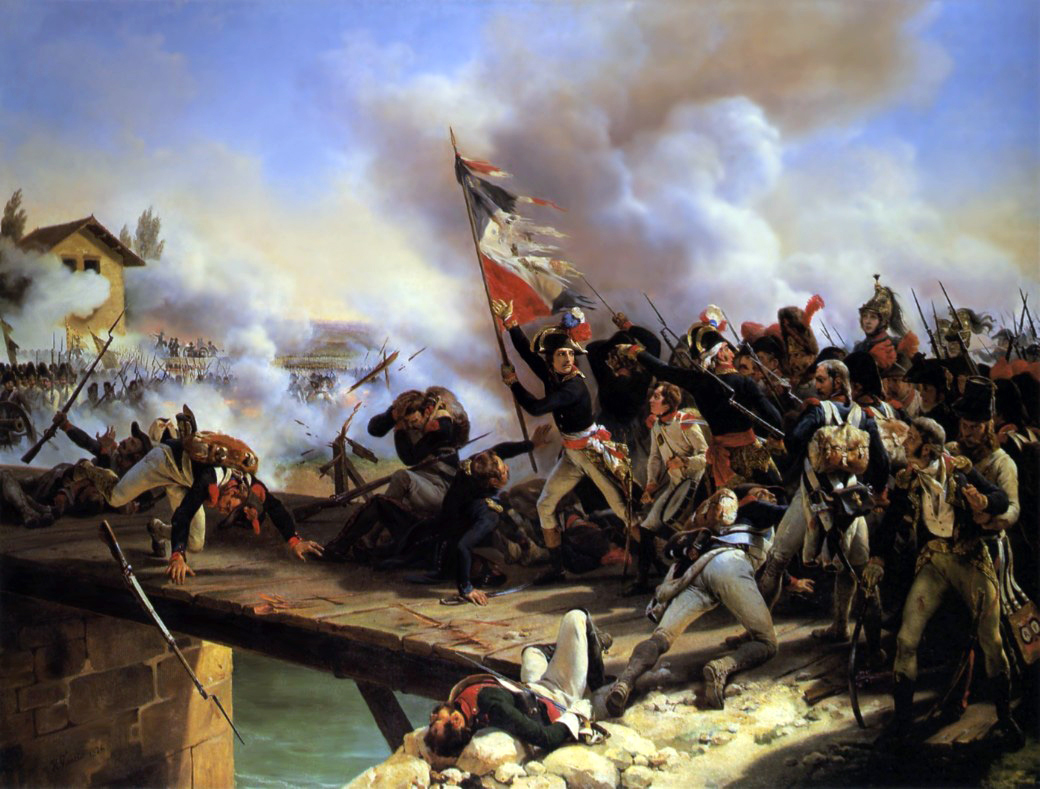
The Crossing of the Arcole Bridge by Horace Vernet, 1826. Fanciful painting shows Bonaparte leading his troops across the Arcole bridge.

In 1796, József Alvinczi led the Austrian army in the third relief of Mantua. Peter Vitus von Quosdanovich's 28,699-man Friaul Corps was divided into six brigades under Pittoni, Anton Lipthay de Kisfalud, Anton Schübirz von Chobinin, Gerhard Rosselmini, Adolf Brabeck, and Prince Friedrich Franz Xaver of Hohenzollern-Hechingen. Another authority stated that Pittoni commanded the 4,376-man army Reserve with four battalions, one squadron. See the Arcola 1796 Campaign Order of Battle. The Friaul Corps was accompanied by Alvinczi in person. Provera took Lipthay and Brabeck on a southerly road toward Fontaniva while Hohenzollern and a newly arrived brigade under Anton Ferdinand Mittrowsky took a northerly road toward Bassano del Grappa.

The Second Battle of Bassano was fought on 6 November 1796. Lipthay, supported by Brabeck and Schübirz, repelled French attacks near Fontaniva, while Hohenzollern and the "main part of the division" held their ground near the village of Nove on the west side of Bassano. The Austrian victory cost Provera's wing 208 killed, 873 wounded, and 109 captured. Quosdanovich's wing suffered 326 killed, 858 wounded, 449 men and two guns captured. This bloody contest cost the French 3,000 killed and wounded plus 508 men and one gun captured.

Pittoni was not specifically noted during a thorough account of the Battle of Arcole on 15 to 17 November. Beginning on the second day, Alvinczi entrusted Mittrowsky with 14 battalions for the defense of Arcole, while Provera was given six battalions to hold Belfiore. At 4:00 PM on the third day, a powerful column of Hungarian grenadiers was committed to the combat at Arcole, which suggests that Pittoni's Reserve was being fed into the battle. Soon afterward, the grenadiers fell into an ambush and retreated. By 5:00 PM the French were masters of Arcole and Mittrowsky finally withdrew. The Austrians lost 600 killed (including Brabeck), 1,600 wounded, and 4,000 men and 11 guns captured in the 3-day fight. French losses numbered 1,200 killed and 2,300 wounded.

Pittoni retired from the army on 28 February 1797. He died in Gorizia on 6 October 1824.

== Notes ==
Footnotes

Citations

Military offices
Preceded by Johann Kollowrat	Oberst (colonel) of Infantry Regiment Nr. 19; 1789–1795	Succeeded by Carl von Adorjan
