= Campaigns of 1796 of the French Revolutionary Wars =

Bonaparte's first campaign in Italy

The French Revolutionary Wars continued from 1795, with the French in an increasingly strong position as members of the First Coalition made separate peaces. Austria and Great Britain were the main remaining members of the coalition. The rebellion in the Vendée was also finally terminated by General Hoche.

Mignet's History of the French Revolution states:

"The Directory found the Rhine open towards Mainz, the war of La Vendée rekindled; the coasts of France and Holland threatened with a descent from England; lastly, the army of Italy destitute of everything, and merely maintaining the defensive under Schérer and Kellermann. Carnot prepared a new plan of campaign, which was to carry the armies of the republic to the very heart of the hostile states. Bonaparte, appointed general of the interior after the events of Vendémiaire, was placed at the head of the army of Italy; Jourdan retained the command of the army of the Sambre-et-Meuse, and Moreau had that of the army of the Rhine, in place of Pichegru. The latter, whose treason was suspected by the Directory, though not proved, was offered the embassy to Sweden, which he refused, and retired to Arbois, his native place. The three great armies, placed under the orders of Bonaparte, Jourdan, and Moreau, were to attack the Austrian monarchy through Italy and Germany, combine at the entrance of the Tyrol and march upon Vienna, in echelon. The generals prepared to execute this vast movement, the success of which would make the republic mistress of the headquarters of the coalition on the continent."

== Italy ==
Bonaparte left Paris on 11 March for Nice to take over the weak and poorly supplied Army of Italy, arriving on 26 March. The army was already being reorganised and supplied when he arrived, and he found that the situation was rapidly improving. He was soon able to carry out the plan for the invasion of Italy that he had been advocating for years, which provided for an advance over the Apennines near Altare to attack the enemy position of Ceva.

The Montenotte Campaign opened after Beaulieu's Austrian forces attacked the extreme French eastern flank near Genoa on 10 April. Bonaparte countered by attacking and crushing the isolated right wing of the allied armies in the Battle of Montenotte on 12 April. The next day he defeated an Austro-Sardinian force at the Battle of Millesimo. He then won a victory at the Second Battle of Dego, driving the Austrians northeast, away from their Piedmontese allies. Satisfied that the Austrians were temporarily inert, Bonaparte harried Michelangelo Colli's Piedmontese at Ceva and San Michele Mondovì before whipping them at the Battle of Mondovì. A week later, on 28 April, Piedmont signed an armistice at Cherasco, withdrawing from the hostilities. On 18 May, Piedmont signed the Treaty of Paris (1796), ceding Savoy and Nice, and allowing France to use its territory for the campaign against Austria.

After a short pause, Bonaparte carried out a brilliant flanking manoeuvre, and crossed the Po at Piacenza, nearly cutting the Austrian line of retreat. The Austrians escaped after the Battle of Fombio, but had their rear-guard mauled at Lodi on 10 May, after which the French took Milan. Bonaparte then advanced eastwards again, drove off the Austrians in the Battle of Borghetto and in June began the Siege of Mantua. Mantua was the strongest Austrian base in Italy. Meanwhile, the Austrians retreated north into the foothills of the Tyrol.

During July and August, Austria sent a fresh army into Italy under Wurmser. Wurmser attacked toward Mantua along the east side of Lake Garda, sending Peter Quasdanovich down the west side in an effort to envelop Bonaparte. Bonaparte exploited the Austrian mistake of dividing their forces to defeat them in detail, but in so doing, he abandoned the siege of Mantua, which held out for another six months. (Carl von Clausewitz mentioned in On War that the siege might have been kept up if Bonaparte had circumvallated the city.) The French defeated Quasdanovich at Lonato on 3 August and Wurmser at Castiglione on 5 August. Wurmser retreated to the Tyrol, and Bonaparte resumed the siege.

In September, Bonaparte marched north against Trento in Tyrol, but Wurmser had already marched toward Mantua by the Brenta River valley, leaving Paul Davidovich's force to hold off the French. Bonaparte overran the holding force at the Battle of Rovereto. Then he followed Wurmser down the Brenta valley, to fall upon and defeat the Austrians at the Battle of Bassano on 8 September. Wurmser elected to march for Mantua with a large portion of his surviving troops. The Austrians evaded Bonaparte's attempts to intercept them but were driven into the city after a pitched battle on 15 September. This left nearly 30,000 Austrians trapped in the fortress. This number rapidly diminished due to disease, combat losses, and hunger.

The Austrians sent yet another army under József Alvinczi against Bonaparte in November. Again the Austrians divided their effort, sending Davidovich's corps from the north while Alvinczi's main body attacked from the east. At first they proved victorious over the French at Bassano, at Calliano, and at Caldiero. But Bonaparte ultimately defeated Alvinczi in the Battle of Arcole southeast of Verona. The French then turned on Davidovich in great strength and chased him into the Tyrol. Wurmser's only sortie was late and ineffectual.

== Germany ==
Meanwhile, Moreau and Jourdan crossed the Rhine and invaded Germany. Moreau was at first completely successful, and having crossed the Rhine and defeated the Austrian forces there, he advanced into Bavaria and fought the Archduke to an inconclusive draw at Neresheim. Advancing to the edge of the Tyrol, he took Ulm and Augsburg, but Jourdan became separated from Moreau and was defeated by the Archduke Charles of Austria at Amberg and Würzburg, and both armies were forced to retreat separately across the Rhine by September (including the Battle of Theiningen), ending with the Battle of Emmendingen in October and the same territorial conditions as the campaign had begun.

== At sea ==
Spain signed the Second Treaty of San Ildefonso with France on 19 August 1796, entering the war against Britain on the side of France in return for concessions in Italy. In response, Britain withdrew from Corsica in order to concentrate the Mediterranean fleet at Gibraltar against the combined threat.

== See also ==
- War in the Vendée

Preceded by 1795	French Revolutionary Wars; 1796	Succeeded by 1797
