= Anton Schübirz von Chobinin =

- Born: 21 December 1748; Olomouc, Habsburg monarchy
- Died: 11 June 1801 (aged 52) Graz, Habsburg monarchy
- Allegiance: Habsburg monarchy
- Branch: Cavalry, infantry
- Rank: Generalmajor
- Conflicts: French Revolutionary Wars

Anton Schübirz or Anton Schubirz von Chobinin (21 December 1748 – 11 June 1801) was an Austrian Generalmajor. He fought for Habsburg monarchy against Ottoman Turkey and the French First Republic. He participated in several noteworthy actions during the French Revolutionary Wars. As a newly promoted general officer in Italy, he led a brigade in an all-night action against the French at Codogno, part of the Battle of Fombio in May 1796. In the sparring before the Battle of Castiglione, he showed initiative in bringing his troops to the assistance of a fellow general. He also fought at Fontaniva, Caldiero, and Arcole in the autumn of 1796. This was the theater of war where a young French general named Napoleon Bonaparte earned his fame. Schübirz retired from the army in 1798 and died three years later.

== Early career ==
On 21 December 1748, Schübirz was born at Olomouc (Olmütz), a fortress town in the province of Moravia in Habsburg monarchy (today in the Czech Republic). Upon leaving the Vienna Neustadt Academy, he became a junior Leutnant in the Batthyanyi Dragoon Regiment Nr. 7 on 23 December 1768. He was promoted Leutnant on 1 January 1722, Rittmeister (captain) on 10 April 1773, and Major on 21 March 1786. Schübirz performed notable service against the Ottoman Turks at Dubica on 25 April 1788 during the Austro-Turkish War (1787–91). On 16 January 1790 he was appointed Oberstleutnant of the Stab Dragoon Regiment. That October he transferred back to the Batthyanyi Dragoons and was made Oberst (Colonel) of the regiment on 30 November. He became Oberst of the newly created Mészáros Uhlan Regiment Nr. 1 on 1 November 1791.

Another source states that Schübirz was elevated to Major in the Josef Kinsky Dragoon Regiment Nr. 12 (the successor to the Batthyanyi Regiment) on 30 May 1788, to Oberstleutnant in 1789, and to Oberst of the Mészáros Uhlans in 1790. In 1795, he led a cavalry brigade in Lombardy.

== 1796 ==
=== Montenotte Campaign ===
On 4 March 1796, Schübirz found himself elevated to the rank of Generalmajor in Johann Peter Beaulieu's Austrian army of Italy. That spring he was assigned to command 10 squadrons of the Archduke Joseph Hussar Regiment Nr. 2 at Pavia and several squadrons of the Mészáros Uhlans near Lodi. He led these troops during the Montenotte Campaign in April.

During the campaign, Bonaparte's army badly defeated the Sardinian army and forced the Kingdom of Sardinia to sue for peace. The small Austrian Auxiliary Corps, which fought under Sardinian command, was placed in a tight spot when its allies laid down their arms. Since its previous commander, Giovanni Marchese di Provera had been captured at the Battle of Millesimo, Beaulieu appointed Schübirz to bring the Corps to safety. In this he was successful, though he had to make a circuitous march in order to get away.

=== Fombio and Codogno ===
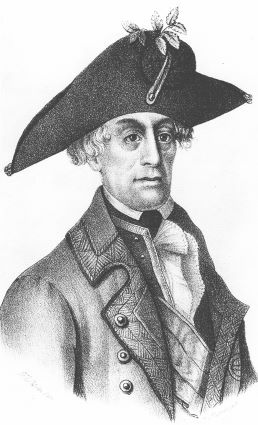
Johann Peter Beaulieu

As Beaulieu fell back into the Duchy of Milan, Schübirz's troops reached a position at Lomello on the Agogna River on 2 May. By the 7th, his retreating troops joined those of Philipp Pittoni von Dannenfeld, forming a body of seven battalions and 12 squadrons. By dawn on the following day, Bonaparte managed to slip Claude Dallemagne's 5,000-strong advance guard across the Po River behind Beaulieu's strategic left flank. The 6,500 men of Amédée Emmanuel François Laharpe's division soon followed. During the day, the rapidly moving French defeated Anton Lipthay de Kisfalud at the Battle of Fombio and pressed forward to occupy the town of Codogno.

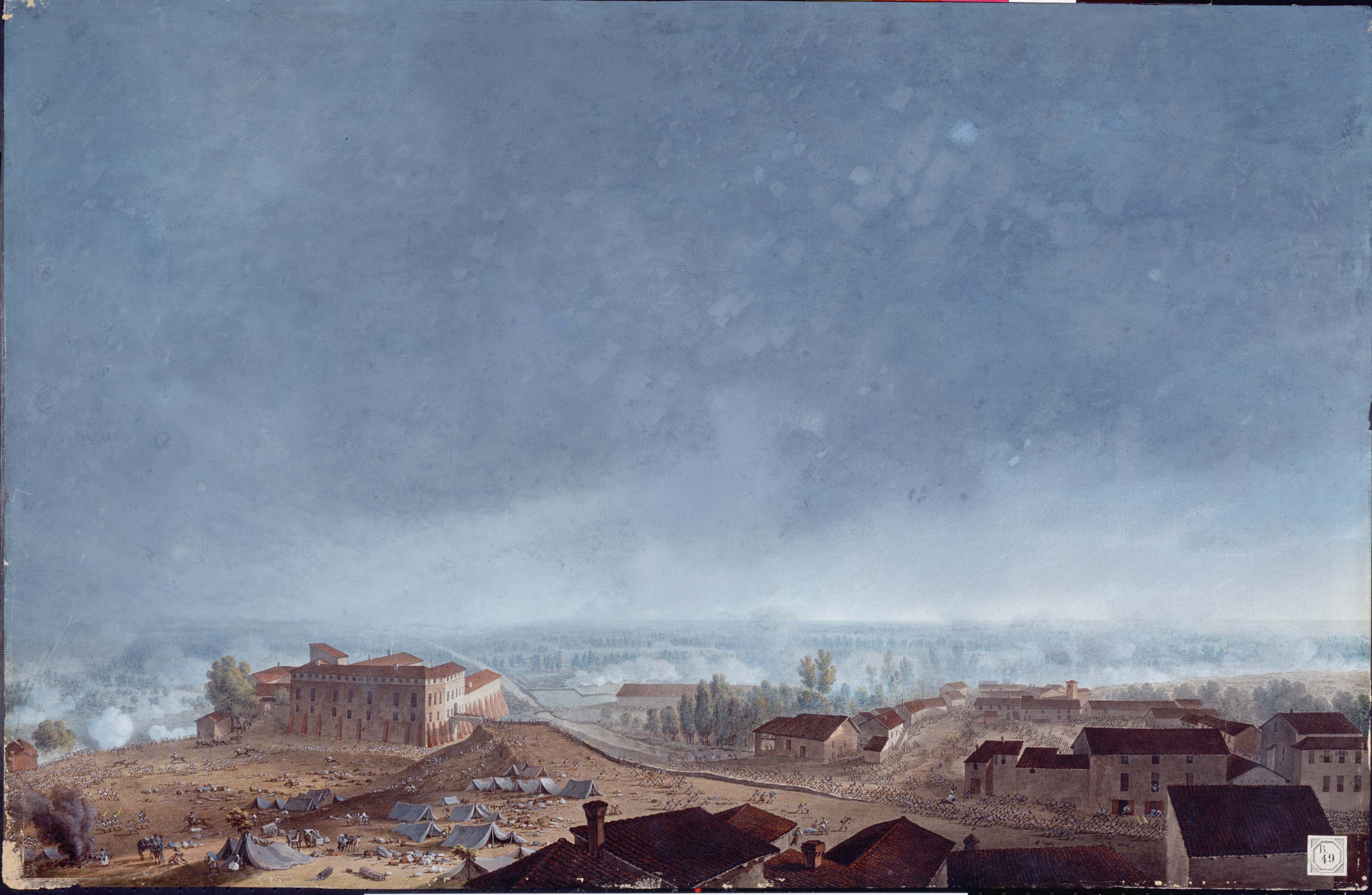
Battle of Fombio by Giuseppe Pietro Bagetti (1764–1831)

As Beaulieu tried to retreat east beyond the Adda River, he found that the French were already across the southernmost roads. Hoping to cut his way through in the morning, the Austrian commander sent Schübirz toward Codogno with two battalions of the Reisky Infantry Regiment Nr. 13 and four squadrons of Uhlans, about 1,000 foot soldiers and 580 cavalrymen. Arriving at Codogno in the dark, Schübirz decided on his own initiative to capture the place. At around 10:00 PM, his troops routed the French pickets and infiltrated much of the town. Soon, Laharpe and his staff received reports of the Austrian incursion and went out to find out what was going on. It so happened that the French 51st Line Infantry Demi-Brigade was marching through the center of town. As the troops reached the town square, they were ambushed by soldiers of the Reisky Regiment and soon both sides were firing blindly into the darkness. After the French rounded up a number of Austrian prisoners, they found Laharpe shot dead, possibly by friendly fire.

With the division commander down, Bonaparte's chief of staff Louis-Alexandre Berthier arrived to direct the fighting. In the wee hours, 75th Line and the 17th Light Infantry Demi-Brigades added their weight to the battle. By dawn, convinced that the odds against him were increasing, Schübirz withdrew. Given some breathing room by his lieutenant's all-night combat, on 9 May Beaulieu directed his troops to cross the Adda farther north at Lodi. The Battle of Lodi occurred on 10 May, though Schübirz missed it, having been ordered to march four battalions and four squadrons to Crema.

By 16 May, the Austrian army pulled back behind the Mincio River, covered on its right rear by Schübirz. After the Battle of Borghetto on 30 May, Beaulieu withdrew north into the Tyrol. At this time an English observer, Thomas Graham noted that Schübirz was one of the few generals still with the army.

=== Castiglione ===
Though his name does not appear in the Castiglione 1796 Campaign Order of Battle, he nevertheless served with the army. At 3:00 AM on 2 August 1796, the army of Dagobert Sigmund von Wurmser, having relieved Mantua, began to move on Goito. An advance guard led by Lipthay, plus a body of troops commanded by Schübirz crossed the Mincio at Goito. Wanting to prevent Wurmser from attacking his rear while he disposed of Peter Quasdanovich's column, Bonaparte ordered Pierre Augereau to attack the Austrian advance guard at Castiglione delle Stiviere.

Accordingly, on 3 August, Augereau fell on Lipthay's 4,000-strong brigade with 11,000 men. Though driven back, the Austrians put up a spirited fight. Schübirz made the soldierly decision to march at once for the sound of the guns. Once he arrived on the field, he launched an effective attack that saved the village of Solferino from capture and helped halt the French advance. On 5 August at the Battle of Castiglione, Schübirz and Anton Ferdinand Mittrowsky held the Austrian right flank at Solferino. Helped by late-arriving reinforcements, the right wing got away in good order. Schübirz led the rear guard of three squadrons of hussars, which were the last Austrians to cross the Mincio at the Borghetto bridge.

=== Arcole ===
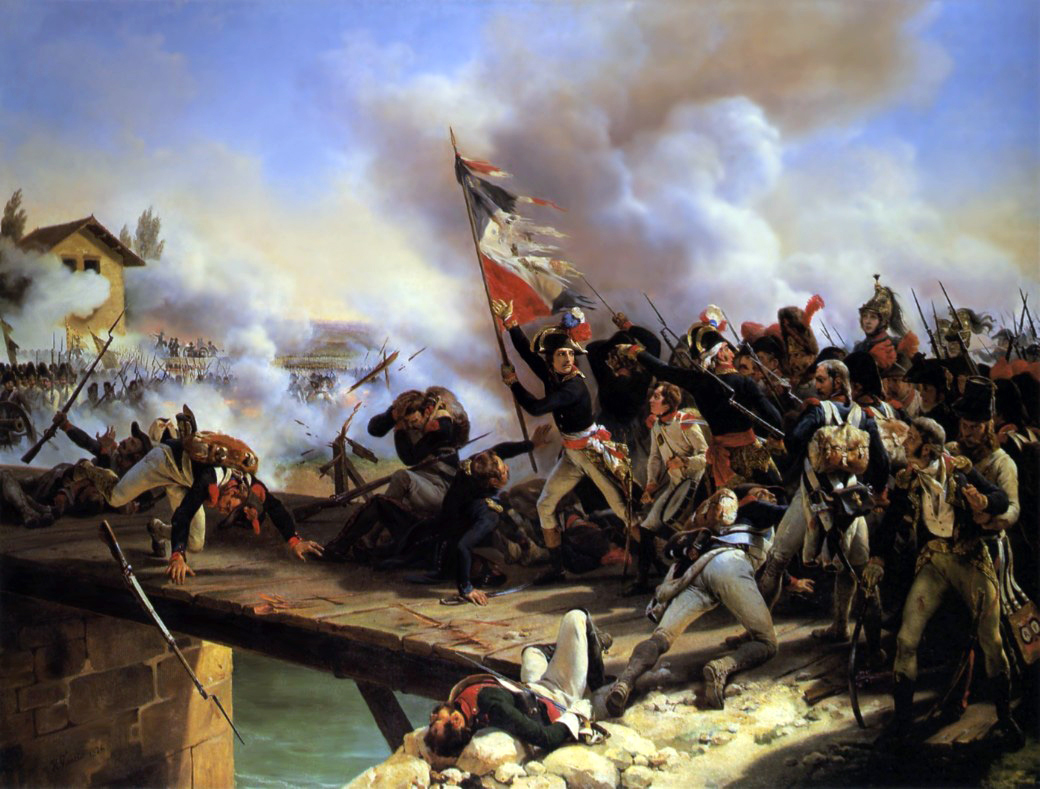
The Crossing of the Arcole Bridge by Horace Vernet, 1826

On 16 August after the Castglione campaign, Schübirz was ordered to march two battalions of the Deutschmeister Infantry Regiment Nr. 4 and two squadrons of the Erdödy Hussar Regiment Nr. 11 to hold Pontebba, a strategic point in northeastern Italy. The trek took two weeks but as soon as he arrived there, he was recalled to Bassano del Grappa. This march took an additional two weeks, but by this time the Battle of Bassano was fought on 8 September.

In late October 1796, Schübirz commanded a brigade in the Friaul Corps, which was accompanied by the army commander József Alvinczi. He was present in the Second Battle of Bassano on 6 November, where his troops were called upon to reinforce Lipthay's roughly handled brigade near Fontaniva. The French suffered 3,000 killed, wounded, and missing, while 508 soldiers and one howitzer were captured. The victorious Austrians did not escape heavy losses. Quasdanovich's right wing at Bassano lost 1,633 men and two guns, while Provera's left wing at Fontaniva lost 1,190, including 208 killed, 873 wounded, and 109 captured.

At the Battle of Caldiero on 12 November, Prince Friedrich Franz Xaver of Hohenzollern-Hechingen held off Bonaparte's initial attacks. Schübirz brought up his brigade sometime after 3:00 PM, and together with other reinforcements, the Austrians repulsed the French and forced them back into Verona. The Austrians inflicted 1,800 casualties on their enemies for a loss of about 1,300 men.

On the second day of the Battle of Arcole, Schübirz's brigade was sent to reinforce Mittrowsky at the village of Arcole. The orders for the morning of 16 November were to attack the French and drive them into the Adige River. At first, the attack met with success. But when the Austrian right wing gave way at Belfiore, the soldiers lost heart and fell back to Arcole. By holding both banks of the Alpone River in strength, Mittrowsky defeated all French attacks on the 16th. The following day saw bitter fighting and until 4:00 PM it looked as though the Austrians might prevail. But another collapse of Austrian resistance at Belfiore allowed Bonaparte to concentrate against Arcole and the village finally fell at 5:00 PM on the 17th. That evening, the French tried to cut the main east–west highway but, at Alvinczi's direction, Schübirz drove them back. This final action of the day allowed the Austrian right wing to get away.

Schübirz retired from the military in 1798 and died at Graz on 11 June 1801. Another source gives his retirement date as 1800.
