= Siege of Šabac (1788) =

- Part of Austro-Turkish War (1788–1791)
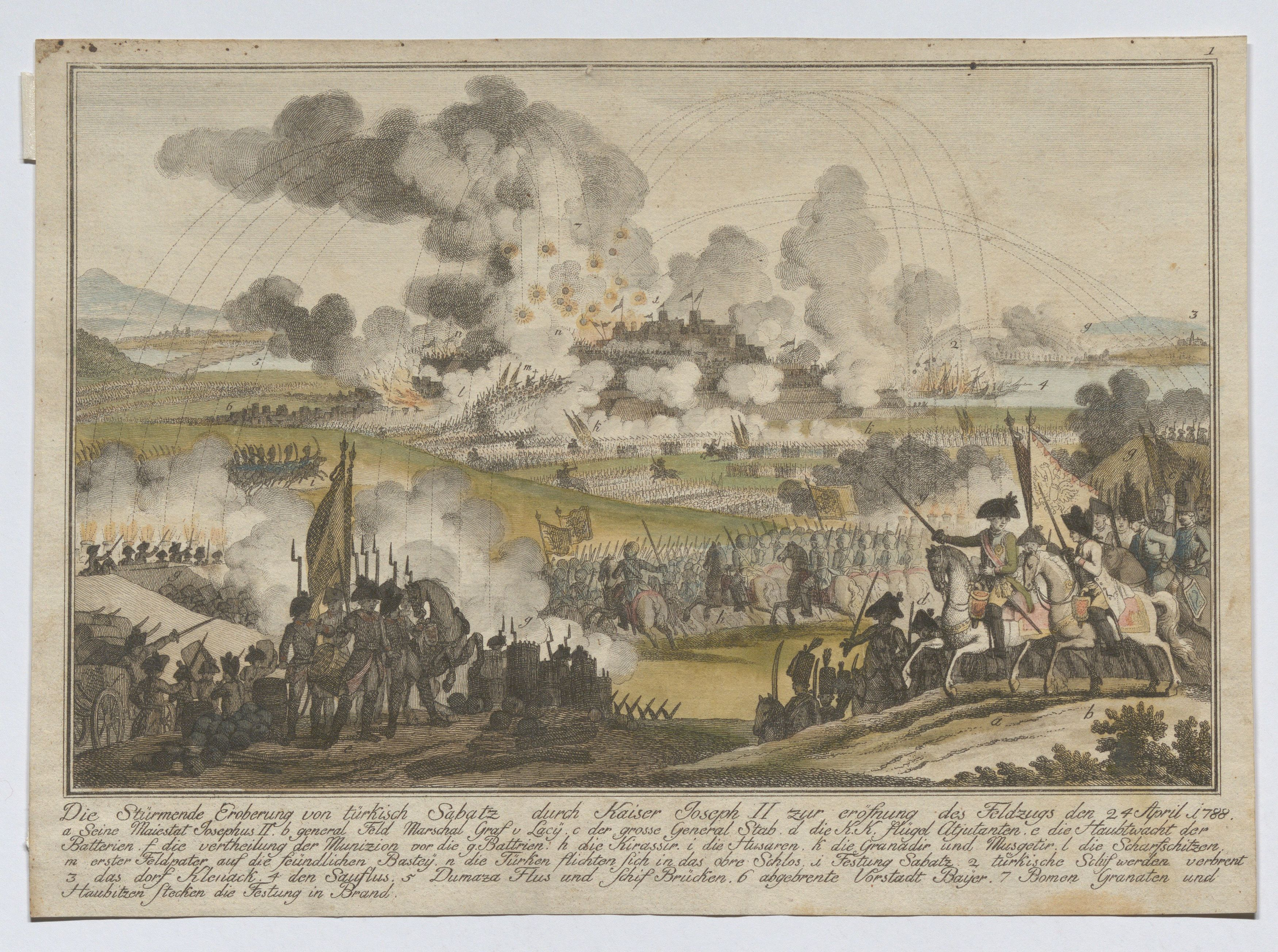
- Joseph II and the Taking of Šabac. (April 24, 1788)
Date	21–24 April 1788
Location	Šabac
Result	Habsburg victory

Belligerents
Habsburg monarchy	Ottoman Empire

Commanders and leaders
(Habsburg monarchy) Anton Ferdinand Mittrowsky	Unknown

Strength
Eight infantry battalions, a unit of Hussars, a heavy cavalry and a detachment of engineers.	Unknown

Casualties and losses
6 dead, 11 wounded.	800 POWs, 17 cannons and 16 standards captured.

The siege of Šabac in 1788 was a military engagement that took place during the Austro-Turkish War of 1788–1791, in which Habsburg Austrian forces under General Anton Ferdinand Mittrowsky captured the Ottoman-held fortress of Šabac after a three-day siege and bombardment.
