= Giovanni Marchese di Provera =

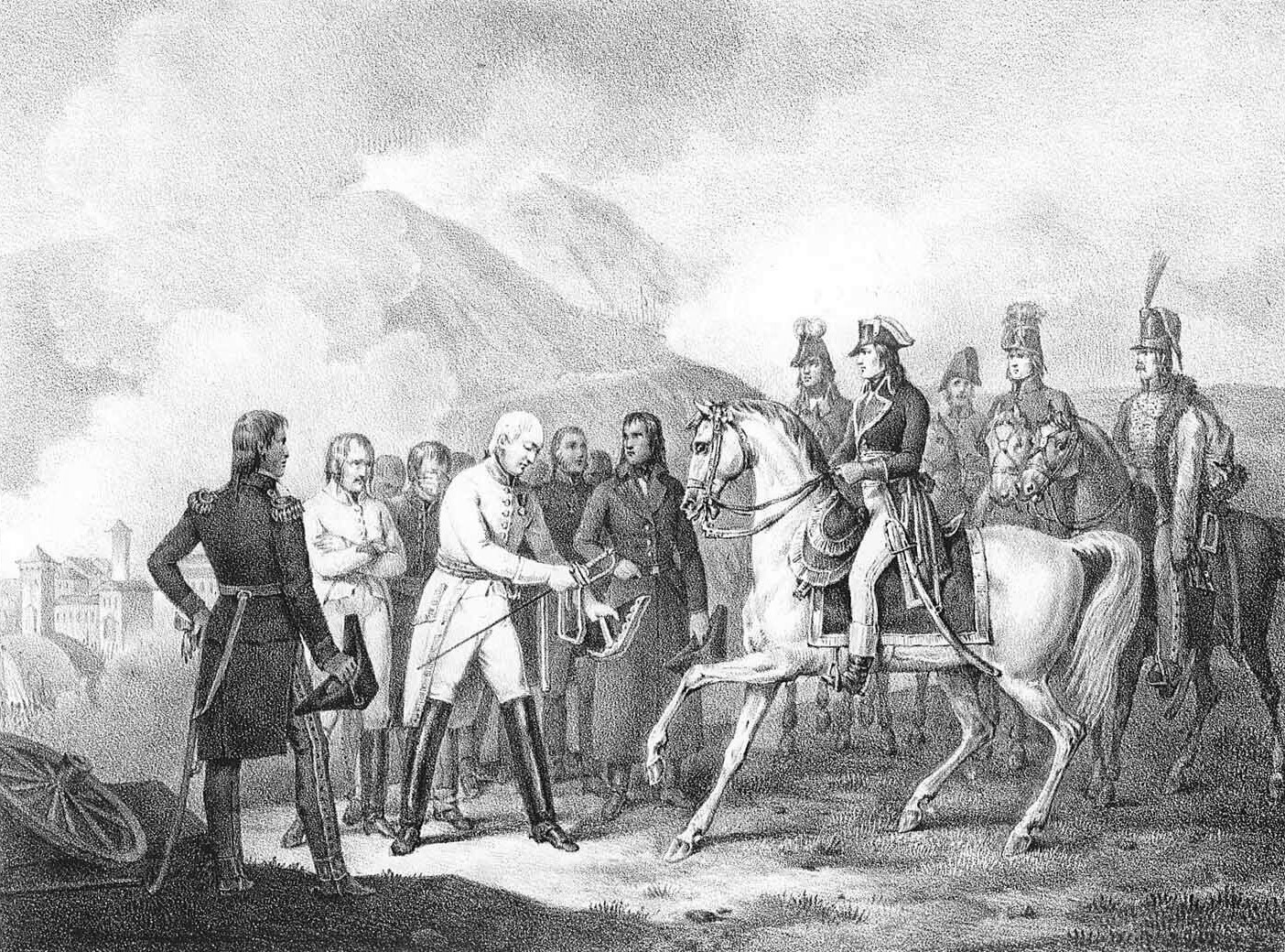
- General Giovanni Provera taken prisoner by French forces after the Battle of Millesimo, 14 April 1796
- Born: 1736; Italy
- Died: 5 July 1804 (aged 67–68) Venice, modern-day Italy
- Allegiance: Habsburg monarchy
- Branch: Infantry
- Rank: Feldmarschall-Leutnant
- Conflicts: Seven Years' War; Battle of Kolin; War of the Bavarian Succession; Austro-Turkish War (1788–1791); War of the First Coalition; Battle of Millesimo; Second Battle of Bassano; Battle of Caldiero; Battle of Arcole; Siege of Mantua
- Awards: Order of Malta, Knight

Giovanni Marchese di Provera or Johann Provera (1736 – 5 July 1804) served in the Habsburg Austrian army in Italy during the French Revolutionary Wars, rising to command a 9,000-man independent corps during the War of the First Coalition. Previously, he fought in the Seven Years' War, the War of the Bavarian Succession, and the Austro-Turkish War. In 1796–1797, Provera played a significant role in three Italian campaigns against the Republican French army of Napoleon Bonaparte.

== Early career ==
Since he was reportedly 60 years old in 1796, Provera was probably born around 1736. He fought at the Battle of Kolin on 18 June 1757 during the Seven Years' War. In 1778–1779 during the War of the Bavarian Succession he commanded the Provera Grenadier Battalion. which consisted of the grenadier companies from Infantry Regiments Huff Nr. 1, Harrach Nr. 7, and Anton Colloredo Nr. 20. In 1779, Provera was appointed Oberst (colonel) of Infantry Regiment Nugent Nr. 56. The previous Oberst was Christian von Fürstenberg. On 18 June 1789, Provera was promoted to Generalmajor, the rank to date from 23 April 1789. He was succeeded as Oberst by Heinrich XV, Prince Reuss of Greiz. By 1789, the regiment was known as the Wenzel Colloredo Nr. 56 and had been serving in the Austro-Turkish War. Provera was a knight of the Sovereign Military Order of Malta and held the noble rank of Marchese.

== Italian campaign ==
=== Cosseria Castle ===
Provera fought in the Italian campaigns in 1794 and 1795. He was appointed Feldmarschall-Leutnant on 4 March 1796 to date from 26 February 1794. In March 1796 Provera assumed command of the Austrian Auxiliary Corps which consisted of 8 infantry battalions and 4 cavalry squadrons, with headquarters at Savigliano. The units under his command were the Staff Dragoons, Garrison Regiment (1 battalion), Giulay Freikorps (2 battalions), and Infantry Regiments Strassoldo Nr. 27 (1 battalion), Belgiojoso Nr. 44 (2 battalions), and Schmidtfeld Nr. 48 (2 battalions).

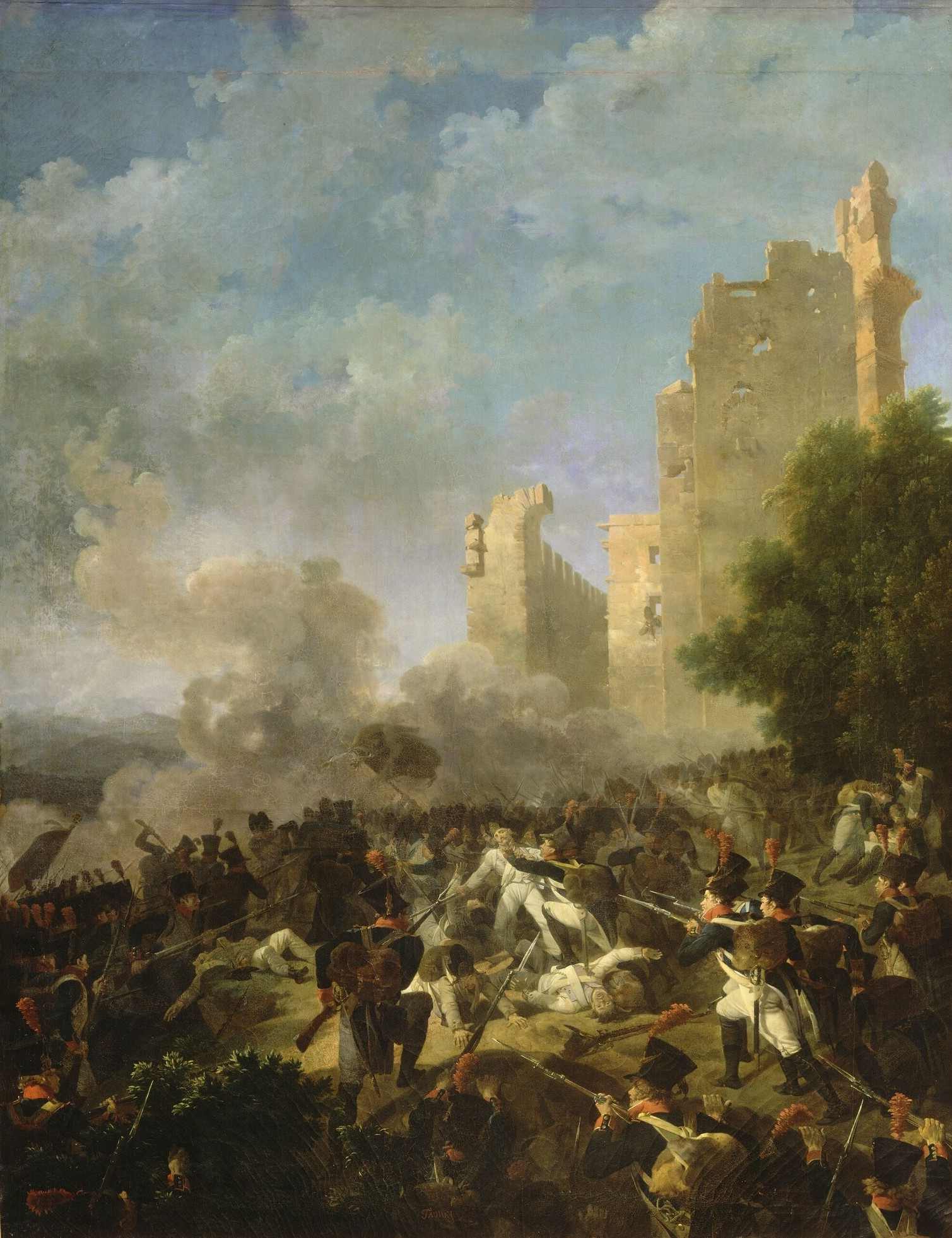
The battle at Cosseria Castle

During the Montenotte Campaign in April 1796, Provera led the 4,000-man Austrian Auxiliary Corps in the 21,000-strong army of the Kingdom of Sardinia-Piedmont. The Sardinians were allied to a 32,000-man Habsburg army led by Johann Peter Beaulieu. On 4 April, Provera with only 4 battalions and 2 companies was ordered to form the link between Beaulieu's Austrian army to the east and Michelangelo Alessandro Colli-Marchi's Sardinian army to the west. Since he was supposed to cover a distance of 22 mi (35 km) through rough terrain with only 2,000 soldiers, the task was all but impossible. On 11 April, Napoleon Bonaparte concentrated almost 30,000 French troops near Carcare. This force faced only Provera's 2,000 men and Eugène-Guillaume Argenteau's 9,000 Austrians. Colli ordered Filippo Del Caretto's Sardinian grenadier battalion to reinforce Provera.

On 12 April, Bonaparte's French army routed Argenteau's division at the Battle of Montenotte. The following day, Charles-Pierre Augereau's French division marched west and encountered Provera's command at the Battle of Millesimo. Hopelessly outnumbered, Provera's men were withdrawing when Del Caretto's 569 Sardinian grenadiers appeared. Together with some men from the Giulay Freikorps and Provera himself, Del Caretto's men occupied the ruined Cosseria Castle. Shortly after 8:00 pm, Provera's 892 men were surrounded by French soldiers. To the initial summons to surrender, Del Caretto replied, "Know that you are dealing with grenadiers, and that Piedmontese grenadiers never surrender." The French made several unsuccessful attempts to storm the castle, the most serious at 4:00 pm. Because the defenders were running out of ammunition, the French were able to get close to the defenses and inflict 150 casualties, including Del Caretto killed. However, the French losses were more severe, and Provera reported that his troops inflicted 600 casualties on their foes. The French 18th Line Infantry lost 107 killed and 206 wounded. The French dead included General of Brigade Pierre Banel. One historian estimated French losses as 700 killed and wounded.

At 5:00 pm, Provera offered a truce by which the French were allowed to remove their wounded soldiers. Colli's force hovered in the area but did not attempt a rescue. Meanwhile, Provera's garrison was without water, food, and ammunition. On 14 April at 8:15 am, Provera signed the articles of surrender which granted the defenders the honors of war. The officers and one sergeant from each company were released on parole after promising not to fight until exchanged for a French prisoner. The rank and file became prisoners of war.

=== Arcole ===
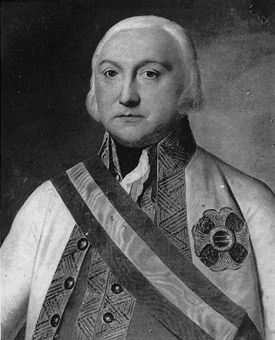
József Alvinczi

After being exchanged, in early October 1796, Provera was placed in command of the right wing of the Friuli Corps in József Alvinczi's Austrian army in the third attempt to relieve the Siege of Mantua. On 21 October, Alvinczi began moving the bulk of the Friuli Corps westward to join Provera at Pordenone. The Friuli Corps was organized with Peter Vitus von Quosdanovich as its commander and its strength was 26,434 men and 74 guns. The corps consisted of an advance guard of 4,397 soldiers, a reserve of 4,376 troops, and a Main Body under Provera. The Main Body consisted of a first line of 9,380 soldiers and a second line of 8,279 men; each line was divided into two brigades. The Tyrol Corps included 16,815 soldiers and 60 guns. Soon, the Tyrol Corps was reinforced to 18,427 men and the Friuli Corps was reinforced to 28,699 soldiers with the addition of Anton Ferdinand Mittrowsky's brigade. The Austrian strategy was for the Tyrol Corps to move south and the Friuli Corps to advance west, with the two forces aiming to unite near Verona.

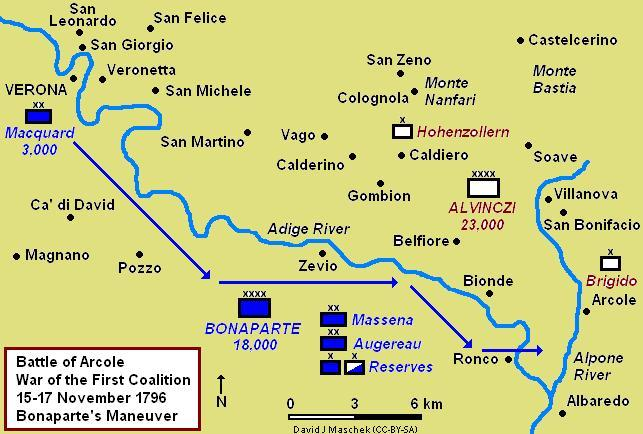
Battle of Arcole, 15-17 November 1796

At the Second Battle of Bassano on 6 November 1796, Provera assumed command of the left wing of the Friuli Corps near Fontaniva with the brigades of Anton Lipthay and Adolf Balduin von Brabeck. All day, André Massena's French division attacked Lipthay's brigade without success. At about 3:00 pm, Provera reinforced Lipthay with elements from Brabeck's and Anton Schübirz's brigades. Lipthay's brigade suffered 1,188 casualties. At the Battle of Caldiero on 12 November, Bonaparte attacked the Austrian advanced guard in a rain and hailstorm. Again, the Austrians stood their ground until they were reinforced by Brabeck at 3:00 pm, followed by Schübirz and Provera. The French finally withdrew, conceding victory to the Austrians.

At the Battle of Arcole on 15 to 17 November, Bonaparte established a bridgehead across the Adige River to threaten the Austrian left rear. He sent Augereau's division north to attack Arcole and Massena's division northwest to attack Belfiore. Alois von Gavasini's brigade moved along the dike between Belfiore and the bridgehead, while Brabeck's troops advanced along a dike along the bank of the Adige. Gavasini's men had an initial success, capturing two cannons. However, a friendly fire incident between the two columns caused confusion and Massena drove Gavasini back to Belfiore, capturing three guns. On 16 November, Provera took charge of the 6 battalions and 2 squadrons attacking from Belfiore. Massena ambushed the advancing column, Brabeck was killed and the Austrians were routed, losing 5 guns. On 17 November, Provera's troops attacked Massena, were repulsed again, and began to withdraw. The French finally captured Arcole and nearly reached the main highway, which would have cut off Provera's retreat. However, a counterattack by Schübirz drove back the French and allowed Provera's men to slip past.

=== La Favorita ===
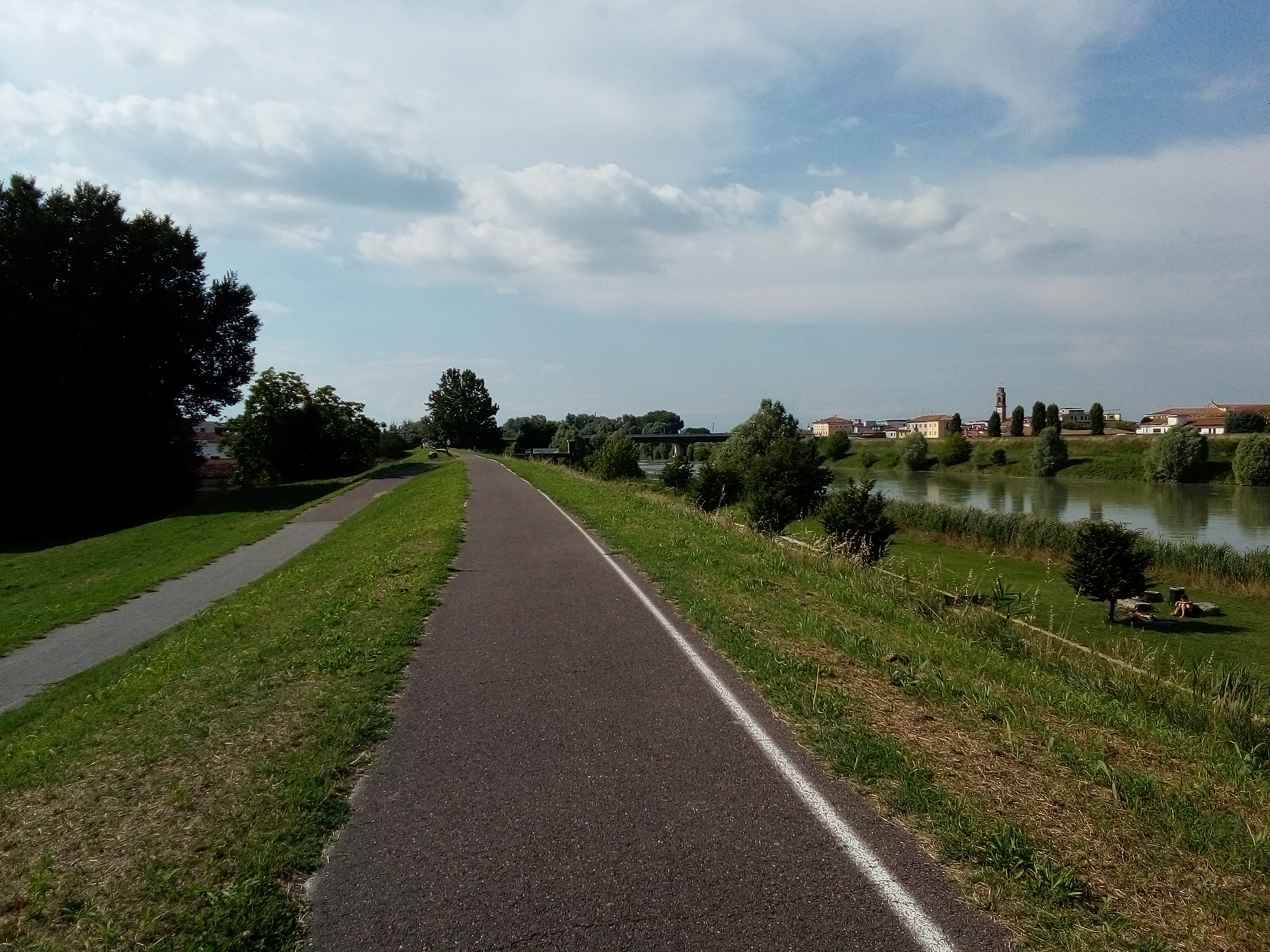
Adige River at Legnago

In the fourth attempt to relieve Mantua, Alvinczi led the main Austrian effort from the north, down the Adige valley with 28,000 soldiers. While the French army focused its attention to the north, Provera's 9,000 men struck at Legnago and Adam Bajalics von Bajahaza's 6,200 Austrians attacked Verona. There were 18,492 Austrians besieged in Mantua, of whom only 9,800 were fit for service. On 9 January Provera drove in the French outposts near Legnago. Over the next few days he scouted the Adige to find a place to cross. The elderly general "showed very little sense of urgency" and "simply could not make up his mind what to do. On 11 January, he decided to order a bridge to be built over the Adige, then countermanded it soon afterwards." On the afternoon of 13 January Provera built a pontoon bridge over the Adige at Angiari, crossed that night, and headed for Mantua the next day. He left a force behind to defend the bridge.

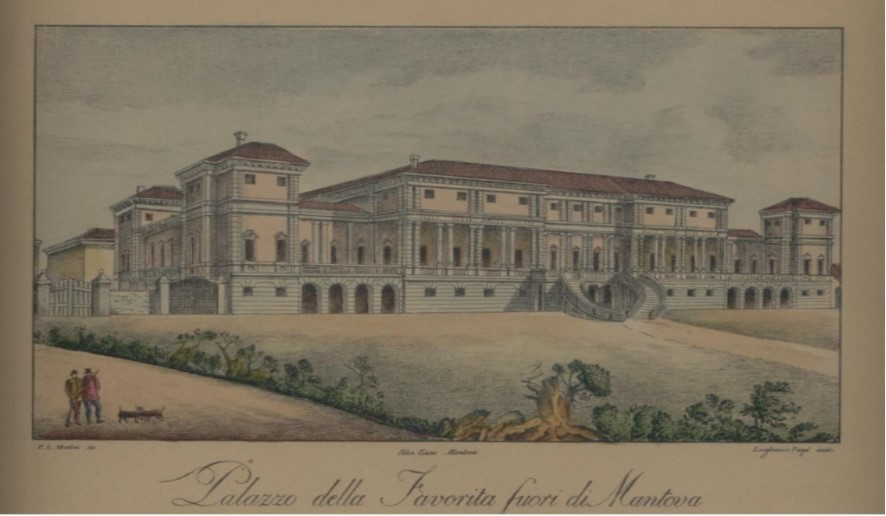
Villa La Favorita in 1829

On 14 January 1797, Provera brushed aside blocking forces under Louis André Bon and Jean Joseph Guieu and camped at Nogara that night. Meanwhile, Augereau, whose division was guarding the river, attacked the bridge guards, captured 1,500 infantry, and destroyed the bridge. On 15 January, because Provera's leading cavalry regiment had uniforms similar to the 1st Hussar Regiment, they were allowed to approach the French-held San Giorgio suburb. Just in time, a French sergeant recognized the enemy, shouted the alarm, and ran to close the gate. Provera demanded that that garrison of San Giorgio surrender, but its commander Sextius Miollis refused. Thwarted here, Provera headed for the Villa La Favorita and ordered his drummers to signal the garrison of Mantua. Incredibly, Mantua's commander, Dagobert Sigmund von Wurmser only slowly realized that a relief force was nearby. Instead of launching an immediate sortie from the city, Wurmser planned to attack the following day.

On 14 January, Bonaparte defeated Alvinczi at the Battle of Rivoli. Leaving Barthélemy Joubert to complete the victory with his own and Gabriel Venance Rey's divisions, Bonaparte ordered Massena's division to march south toward Mantua. At dawn on 16 January, Wurmser ordered 2,200 soldiers under Karl Philipp Sebottendorf to attack from the citadel. At first, the sortie made progress, but Massena's troops began arriving after a forced march, and drove the Austrians back into the citadel. Provera was unable to capture Villa La Favorita and his troops were soon hemmed in by French troops commanded by Massena, Augereau, Claude Victor, Thomas-Alexandre Dumas, and Jean Sérurier. At 11:30 am, Provera realized that escape was impossible. At 2:00 pm he and Sérurier signed articles that surrendered 7,000 soldiers, 22 guns, a pontoon train, and a food convoy intended for the Mantua garrison.

== Retirement and death ==
Provera retired from military service on 29 April 1797. He died on 5 July 1804 at Venice.

== Notes ==
Military offices
Preceded by Christian von Fürstenberg	Oberst (colonel) of Infantry Regiment Nr. 56; 1779–1789	Succeeded by Heinrich XV, Prince Reuss-Greiz
