= François Macquard =

French general (1738–1801)

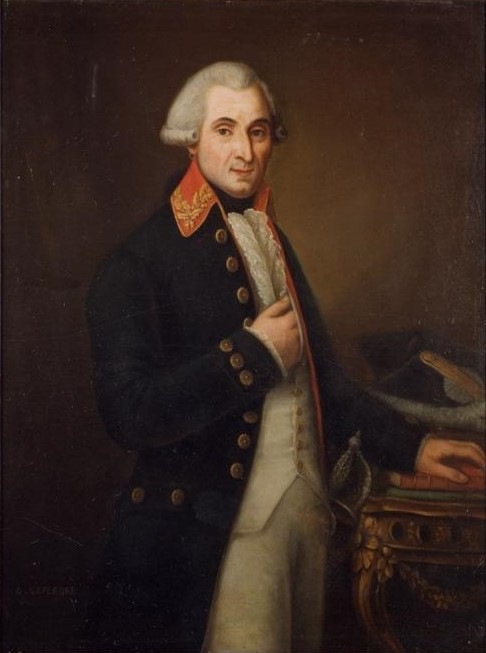
- Portrait of General François Macquard by Gabriel Lefébure, 1865.
- Born: 18 October 1738
- Died: 29 November 1801 (aged 63)
- Military career
- Allegiance: (France) French First Republic
- Rank: General of Division
- Conflicts: Seven Years' War; Battle of Minden; French Revolutionary Wars; Battle of Saorgio; Second Battle of Bassano; Battle of Arcole; Siege of Mantua

François Macquard or François Macquart (18 October 1738 – 29 November 1801) joined the French royal army as an infantryman, fought in the Seven Years' War, and rose slowly from the ranks to become an officer in the 1780s. While serving in Italy during the French Revolutionary Wars, he became a general officer. In the Italian campaign of 1796, he fought in several actions under the orders of Napoleon Bonaparte.

== Early career ==
Macquard joined the French royal army in 1755 as a foot soldier. Wounded four times at the Battle of Minden on 1 August 1759, he later entered the cavalry in a dragoon regiment. In 1785 he received his officer's commission. During the French Revolutionary Wars he served in Army of Italy beginning in 1792 and gained rapid promotion. In 1794 he became a general of brigade and in 1795 he rose to general of division after winning an action at Saorge (Saorgio).

== Under Bonaparte ==
When Bonaparte took over command of the army, Macquard led a small 3,700-man division that guarded the Col de Tende together with Pierre Dominique Garnier's 3,400-strong division. His command included the brigades of Jean David and Claude Dallemagne. During the Montenotte Campaign which ended with the Kingdom of Sardinia-Piedmont suing for peace, Macquard's division was not engaged. After this event, Bonaparte brought Dallemagne's brigade to the front. Macquard's division is listed in the orders of battle for the July 1796 Siege of Mantua. He led a 2,700-strong infantry reserve during the third Austrian relief of Mantua. His reserve was present at the Second Battle of Bassano on 6 November. During the Battle of Arcola his 3,000-man force held Verona and neutralized Austrian General Jozsef Alvinczi's advance guard.

Macquard retired from the army in 1797 and died in 1801. On 14 August 1796, Bonaparte tersely summed up his qualities, "Brave man, no talent, lively."
