= Johann Ludwig Alexius von Loudon =

Austrian general (1767–1822)

- Born: 10 January 1767; Riga, Russian Empire
- Died: 22 September 1822 (aged 55) Hadersdorf, Austrian Empire
- Allegiance: (Russia) Russian Empire; Austrian Empire
- Branch: Infantry
- Service years: (Austrian Empire) 1789–1809
- Rank: (Russia) Captain (Austrian Empire) Feldmarschall-Leutnant
- Conflicts: Austro-Turkish War (1788–1791); Siege of Belgrade; French Revolutionary Wars; First Battle of Wissembourg; Battle of Calliano; Battle of Neumarkt; Battle of Glanig; Battle of Brixen; Battle of Tauffers; Battle of Novi; War of the Third Coalition; Battle of Elchingen; Battle of Ulm
- Awards: Order of Maria Theresa (1797)

Johann Ludwig Alexius von Loudon (10 January 1767 – 22 September 1822), was the nephew of Feldmarschall Ernst Gideon von Laudon.

== Military career ==
Johann Ludwig Alexius was born as the younger son of Johann Reinhold Freiherr von Loudon (1708–1787) and his wife, Friederike von Hahnenfeldt (1747–1814). He first enlisted in the Imperial Russian Army and rose to the rank of captain. He served until 1789 when joined his famous uncle in the army of Habsburg Austria. He married an Austrian noblewoman in 1791. The next year he was appointed colonel in command of an infantry regiment and fought at the First Battle of Wissembourg in 1793. Promoted to general officer in 1796, he was posted to Italy where he commanded a brigade under Paul Davidovich at Calliano. In early 1797 he led an independent column composed largely of Tyrolean militia and received a coveted award for his efforts.

In 1799 Loudon led a grenadier brigade at Novi and in a few other actions. Promoted again, he was transferred to Poland in 1800 and missed Marengo. In the War of the Third Coalition he fought at Elchingen and was captured by the French at Ulm. He commanded second-line troops in the 1809 campaign and retired from military life soon after.

== Death ==
He died at Hadersdorf in 1822.

== Sources ==
- Boycott-Brown, Martin (2001). The Road to Rivoli: Napoleon's First Campaign. London: Cassell & Co. ISBN 0-304-35305-1.
- Smith, Digby (1998). The Napoleonic Wars Data Book. London: Greenhill. ISBN 1-85367-276-9.
- Smith, Digby; Kudrna, Leopold (2008). "A Biographical Dictionary of all Austrian Generals during the French Revolutionary Wars and Napoleonic Wars 1792-1815: Loudon, (Johann Ludwig) Alexius Freiherr von". The Napoleon Series.
