= Anton Ferdinand Mittrowsky =

Anton Ferdinand Freiherr Mittrowsky von Mittrowitz und Nemyšl
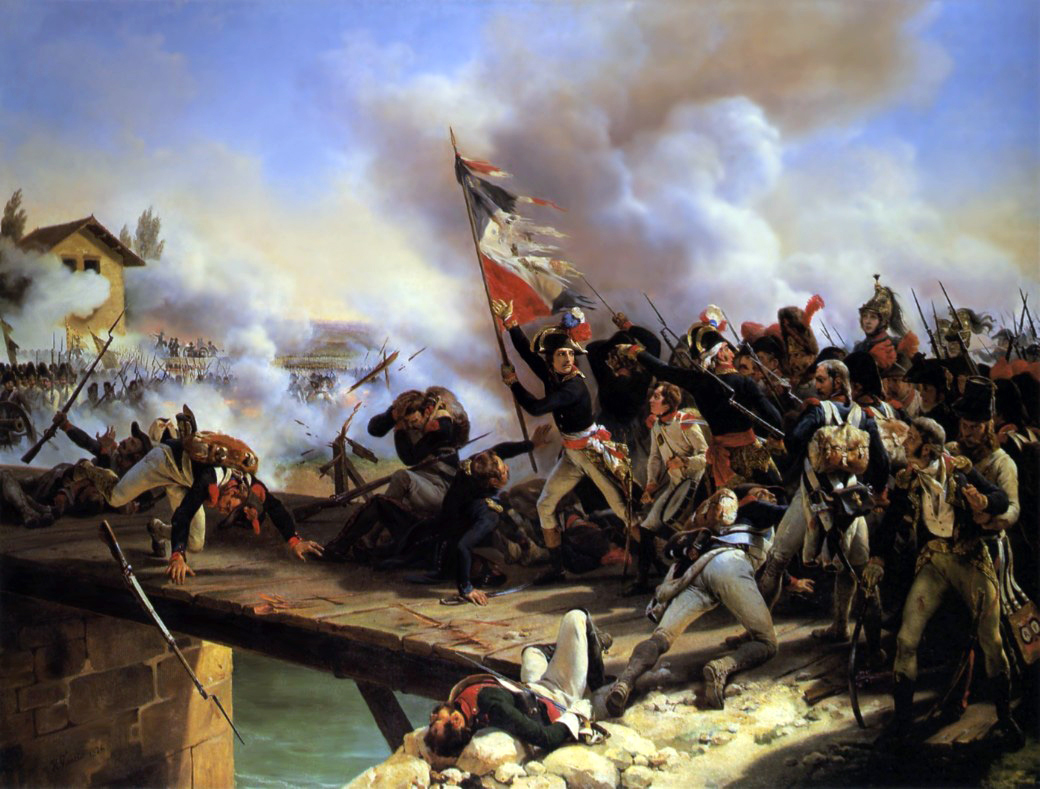
- The Crossing of the Arcole Bridge by Horace Vernet, 1826. Mittrowsky's Austrian soldiers held Arcole for almost three days against persistent French attacks.
- Born: 1745
- Died: 30 September 1809 (aged 63–64) Vienna, Austria
- Allegiance: Habsburg Monarchy; Austrian Empire
- Rank: Feldmarschall-Leutnant
- Conflicts: Austro-Turkish War (1788–1791); Siege of Šabac; French Revolutionary Wars; Battle of Neerwinden; Battle of Famars; Siege of Le Quesnoy; Siege of Landrecies; Battle of Beaumont; Battle of Courtrai; Battle of Fleurus; Battle of Castiglione; Battle of Arcole; Battle of Verona; Battle of Magnano; Siege of Turin; Battle of Novi; Battle of Genola; Napoleonic Wars; Battle of Caldiero

Anton Ferdinand Freiherr Mittrowsky von Mittrowitz und Nemyšl, or Anton Mittrowsky, (Note: Smith & Kudrna refer to him as Anton Ferdinand Mittrowsky whereas Schmidt-Brentano (p. 65) and Wurzbach (p. 389) refer to him as Anton Mittrowsky. Boycott-Brown (p. 556) calls him Anton Mittrovsky.) (1745 – 30 September 1809) was promoted to general officer in the spring of 1796, just in time to lead a brigade against Napoleon Bonaparte during the Italian campaign of 1796–1797 in the War of the First Coalition. He served as a regimental commander in 1792–1796, leading his unit at Neerwinden, Famars, and Le Quesnoy in 1793. In the following year, he led the regiment at Landrecies, Beaumont, Courtrai, and Fleurus. In 1796, he led a brigade at Castiglione and 2nd Bassano, and played a pivotal role at Arcole, nearly defeating Bonaparte. In 1799, he commanded troops at Verona, Magnano, Novi, and Genola. During the Napoleonic Wars he led forces at Caldiero in 1805. He became the Proprietor (Inhaber) of an Austrian infantry regiment from 1806 until his death three years later.

== War of the First Coalition ==
Born into a military family around 1745, (Note: Schmidt-Brentano (p. 65) and Wurzbach (p. 389) both gave birth dates of 1735, but Smith & Kudrna stated that Mittrowsky died in 1809 at age 64, i.e., he was born about 1745.) Mittrowsky joined the Habsburg army at an unknown date and served as Oberst (colonel) of the Callenberg Infantry Regiment Nr. 54 in 1792–1796. Mittrowsky led the 1st and 2nd Battalions of the regiment in battles at Tirlemont on 16 March 1793, Neerwinden on 18 March, and Pellenberg on 23 March. In the last action, his regiment captured Pellenberg and then stoutly defended it against French counterattacks. At Neerwinden, the Callenberg Regiment fought in the 2nd Rank under Feldzeugmeister (FZM) Wenzel Joseph von Colloredo. At the Battle of Famars on 23 May 1793, Mittrowsky led the Callenberg regiment in the 1st Main Column under Prince Frederick, Duke of York and Albany. During the Siege of Le Quesnoy, his regiment distinguished itself defending the Forest of Mormal.

At the start of 1794, the 1st and 2nd Battalions garrisoned Denain and later Mons. Three battalions of the Callenberg Regiment were present at the Siege of Landrecies and at the Battle of Beaumont on 26 April 1794. The 2nd Battalion fought at Ingelmunster on 12 May, which was part of the Battle of Courtrai. The 3rd Battalion was captured at the Siege of Ypres. Two battalions of the Callenberg Regiment fought at the Battle of Fleurus on 26 June. One battalion was captured at the Siege of Valenciennes on 27 August and was released, not to fight against France until exchanged. (Note: Wrede (p. 498) stated that the 1st Battalion was captured at Valenciennes while Smith (p. 90) asserted it was the 2nd Battalion.)

Mittrowsky received promotion to the rank of Generalmajor (GM) on 30 April 1796 to date from 19 February 1795. During the first relief of the Siege of Mantua, he led a brigade in Feldmarschall-Leutnant (FML) Paul Davidovich's III Column which had a total strength of 8,274 infantry, 1,618 cavalry, 32 position guns, and 8 howitzers. Detached from his parent column, Mittrowsky's brigade occupied the Chiusa fort and scouted toward Verona. At the Battle of Castiglione on 5 August, Mittrowsky helped defend the right flank against André Masséna's attacks.

At the start of the third relief of Mantua, Mittrowsky's brigade held the upper Brenta River valley as a link between the Tyrol Corps to the north and the Friuli Corps to the east. After army commander FZM Jozsef Alvinczi reached the Brenta with the Friuli Corps, Mittrowsky moved to join its right wing. After heavy fighting in the Second Battle of Bassano on 6 November 1796, Mittrowsky's brigade, which numbered about 3,000 men, was still coming up in the rear of Alvinczi's main body.

When Bonaparte's French army suddenly crossed the Adige River on the morning of 15 November 1796, Oberst Wenzel Brigido's 4 battalions held Arcole and San Bonifacio while Mittrowsky's 3 battalions lay at Cologna Veneta. The initial French attacks in the Battle of Arcole were repelled by 2 battalions of Brigido's Croats defending the village. By 12:30 pm, the first of Mittrowsky's soldiers began to arrive at Arcole and by 3:00 pm all his troops were present. Bonaparte personally led a charge on Arcole, but it was repulsed like all earlier attacks. In the evening, a French force finally seized Arcole.

Mittrowsky reoccupied Arcole when Bonaparte withdrew the isolated French force. On 16 November, Alvinczi entrusted Mittrowsky with 14 infantry battalions and 2 cavalry squadrons from the brigades of Oberst Franz Sticker and GM Anton Schübirz von Chobinin. Alvinczi instructed him to attack at dawn, in conjunction with a second column under FML Giovanni Marchese di Provera; they were to drive the French back to the Adige. Mittrowsky's column made good progress, but when Provera's column was beaten, Mittrowsky's men lost heart and fell back. Mittrowsky then capably defended Arcole, and his troops repulsed repeated French attacks for the remainder of the day. On 17 November, after heavy fighting all day, the French finally captured Arcole at 5:00 pm and Mittrowsky withdrew his troops to San Bonifacio. With his army no longer in a defensible position, Alvinczi ordered a retreat. In three days of fighting, the Austrians sustained 6,211 casualties. Mittrowsky missed the Battle of Rivoli in January 1797, being employed in guarding the Valsugana with a brigade consisting of 3,497 infantry and 73 cavalry.

== Later career ==
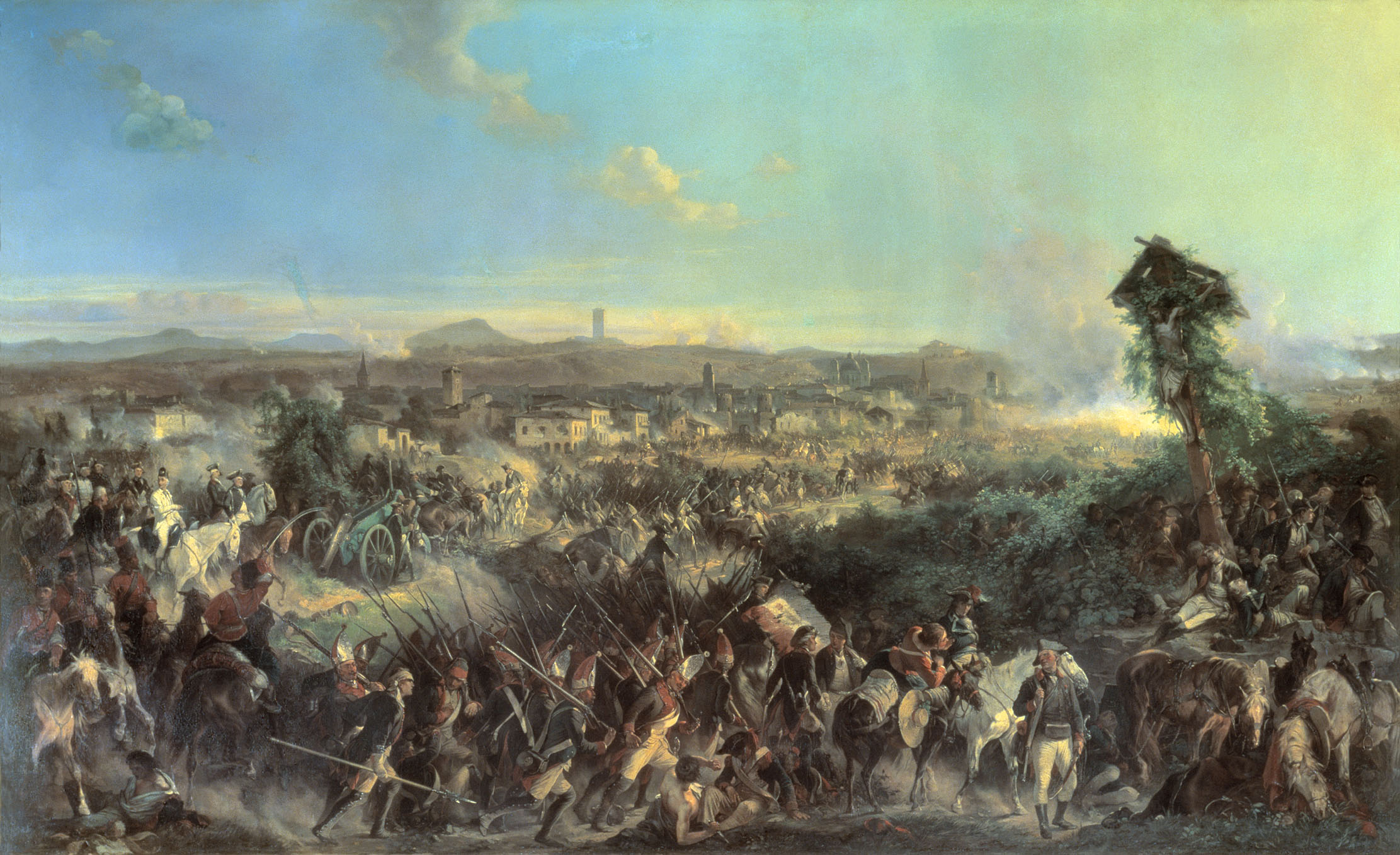
Battle of Novi, by Alexander Kotzebue

The outbreak of the War of the Second Coalition found Mittrowsky serving in the army of Italy under FML Pál Kray. The Battle of Verona on 26 March 1799 was actually three separate actions, those of Pastrengo, Verona, and Legnago. The French prevailed in the first two actions while the Austrians won at Legnago. At Legnago, Mittrowsky commanded 2,186 soldiers that belonged to 2 battalions of vacant ex-Priess Infantry Regiment Nr. 24. At the Battle of Magnano on 5 April, Mittrowsky led a brigade in FML Karl Mercandin's division consisting of Infantry Regiments Nr. 24 and Frelich Nr. 28. Mercandin was killed at Magnano and the division was subsequently led by FML Konrad Valentin von Kaim, but the source does not say if Mittrowsky served at the Battle of Cassano. Mittrowsky served under Kaim at the Siege of Turin which fell on 20 June 1799 after a 10 day investment. Mittrowsky reported that risky measures were taken in order to force a rapid surrender.

During the Battle of Novi on 15 August 1799, Mittrowsky fought with the left wing under the overall supervision of FZM Michael von Melas. Mittrowsky led 2 battalions of the Fürstenberg Infantry Regiment Nr. 36 and 2 squadrons of the Lobkowitz Dragoon Regiment Nr. 10. His troops advanced south and then swung west, keeping on the left of the two grenadier brigades. The French repulsed the right-hand grenadier brigade, but the second brigade and Mittrowsky's troops outflanked them and forced them to retreat. On 13 October 1799, Mittrowsky with 6 battalions and 4 squadrons attacked 2,000 French troops in Beinette, driving them out. The French returned and a see-saw battle occurred which the Austrians won, capturing 465 French soldiers. Mittrowsky was elevated in rank to Feldmarschall-Leutnant on 2 October 1799, to date from 17 September 1799. Mittrowsky commanded the second column at the Battle of Genola on 4–5 November. His force included the Infantry Regiments Reisky Nr. 13 (1,120 men), Terzi Nr. 16 (718 men), and Joseph Mittrowsky Nr. 40 (846 men).

Mittrowsky led a division in the army of Archduke Charles at the Battle of Caldiero on 29–31 October 1805. His division included Infantry Regiments Wenzel Colloredo Nr. 56 (4 battalions), Esterhazy Nr. 32 (3 battalions), and Splény Nr. 51 (3 battalions). During the period 1806–1809, he was deputy to FML Johann I Joseph, Prince of Liechtenstein, the commanding general in Upper and Lower Austria and Salzburg. Emperor Francis II appointed him inhaber (proprietor) of the Anton Mittrowsky Infantry Regiment Nr. 10 in 1806, assuming the position from the previous inhaber, Christian Friedrich von Ansbach-Bayreuth. He remained proprietor until his death when Franz Reisky von Dubnitz became inhaber. Anton Mittrowsky died in Vienna on 30 September 1809.

== Notes ==
Footnotes

Citations

Military offices
Preceded by Wilhelm Lothar Maria von Kerpen	Oberst (Colonel) of Infantry Regiment Nr. 54; 1792–1796	Succeeded by Johann Hansch
Preceded by Christian Friedrich von Ansbach-Bayreuth	Proprietor (Inhaber) of Infantry Regiment Nr. 10; 1806–1809	Succeeded by Franz Reisky von Dubnitz
