= Battle of Calliano =

1796 battle during the War of the First Coalition

- Part of the Italian campaign of 1796–1797 in the War of the First Coalition
Date	6–7 November 1796
Location	Calliano, Trentino 45°56′N 11°5′E
Result	Austrian victory

Belligerents
(France) French First Republic	(Habsburg monarchy) Austria

Commanders and leaders
(France) Claude Vaubois	(Habsburg monarchy) Paul Davidovich

Strength
10,500	19,474

Casualties and losses
Calliano & San Michele: 4,400	Calliano & San Michele: 3,567
- Location within Europe

The Battle of Calliano on 6 and 7 November 1796 saw an Austrian corps commanded by Paul Davidovich rout a French division directed by Claude Belgrand de Vaubois. The engagement was part of the third Austrian attempt to relieve the French siege of Mantua during the French Revolutionary Wars. The battle was preceded by a clash at Cembra on 2 November and followed by actions at Rivoli Veronese on 17 and 21 November.

== Campaign ==
By November 1796, Napoleon Bonaparte's French Army of Italy had reduced Field Marshal Dagobert Sigmund von Wurmser's Austrian garrison of Mantua to near-starvation. Emperor Francis I of Austria appointed Feldzeugmeister Jozsef Alvinczi to lead a new army in smashing though the French blockade. Alvinczi planned to advance on Mantua from the east with the 28,000-man Friaul Corps, while Feldmarschal-Leutnant Davidovich led 19,000 soldiers of the Tirol Corps down the Adige valley from the north.

=== Forces ===
See Order of battle for the Battle of Arcole for a list of the major units of both armies, including the strengths and commanders of the Tyrol Corps' six columns.

=== San Michele: 2 November ===
Bonaparte badly underestimated Davidovich's strength. To oppose the northern thrust, he deployed a division of 10,500 soldiers under General of Division Vaubois. The start of Davidovich's offensive led to a series of clashes beginning on 27 October. On 2 November the French attacked the Austrians at Cembra. Although Vaubois inflicted 1,100 casualties on his enemies at the cost of only 650 Frenchmen, he decided to pull back to Calliano when Davidovich resumed his forward movement the next day. The French 85th Line Infantry Demi-Brigade was roughly handled. The Austrians occupied Trento on 5 November.

== Battle ==
On 6 November, Vaubois repulsed Davidovich's attacks on his position at Calliano, inflicting losses of 753 men. That night the French general detached several units to cover key positions in the area, weakening his main line. At dawn, the Austrians launched a new attack that was resisted all day, Calliano changing hands several times. Some Grenz infantry worked their way into the rear of the French line and this caused a panic-stricken flight from the field beginning at 4 pm.

The second day of fighting at Calliano cost Davidovich another 1,523 men for a total of 3,567 for the campaign. These heavy losses kept the Austrians from vigorously following up the fleeing Frenchmen. Vaubois suffered 4,400 casualties at Cembra and Calliano.

== Aftermath ==
Battles of San Michele, 2nd Bassano, and Calliano, Nov. 1796

During the day of 8 November, the French soldiers retreated to Rivoli Veronese where they finally rallied. Furious over the misbehavior of his troops, Bonaparte issued an announcement to the army in which he harshly criticised the 39th and 85th Demi-Brigades. Meanwhile, in the Po River valley, Alvinczi defeated Bonaparte's attack at the Second Battle of Bassano on 6 November, forcing the French main army to fall back to Verona.

Poor communications continued to plague the Austrian effort. It took two days for dispatches to pass between Davidovich and Alvinczi. Davidovich refrained from attacking the Rivoli position because he believed that André Masséna was present with his division. While Masséna was briefly in command, he did not bring any troops with him. By this time Davidovich probably had 14,000 men, but this includes General-Major (GM) Johann Loudon who was guarding his line of communications with the Tyrol.

=== Rivoli: 17 November ===
Davidovich finally attacked on 17 November, with GM Joseph Ocskay von Ocsko moving from Monte Baldo and GM Josef Philipp Vukassovich advancing from the Adige River gorge. The Austrians gained the Rivoli plateau and steadily forced the outnumbered French back. Again, the brittle morale of the 85th Line snapped and the result was another rout of Vaubois' division. On this occasion, the French lost 800 killed and wounded, plus 1,000 captured including Generals of Brigade Pascal Antoine Fiorella and Antoine La Valette and 7 cannons. The Austrians lost only 600 men. This field would be fought over again during the Battle of Rivoli in January 1797.

=== Rivoli: 21 November ===
The Tyrol Corps' victory came too late. Bonaparte fought and won the Battle of Arcola on 15–17 November. When Davidovich realized that the Army of Italy was moving his way in great strength, he pulled back to Rivoli on 20 November. The next morning, he ordered a retreat to the north. A short time later, he received a note saying that Alvinczi's army was back in the field. Davidovich told his troops to reoccupy their positions at Rivoli, but by this time the French were upon them. In the ensuing action, French losses were about 200. The Austrians lost 251 killed and wounded. In addition, the French captured 608 soldiers, 3 cannons, and a bridging train. One authority gives Austrian losses as 1,500 men and 9 guns. When Alvinczi heard that his colleague was in full retreat up the Adige valley, he withdrew to the Brenta River, ending the campaign.

== See also ==
- Siege of Mantua (1796-1797)
- Second Battle of Bassano, 6 November 1796
- Battle of Caldiero (1796), 12 November 1796
- Battle of Arcole, 15–17 November 1796

== Notes ==
Preceded by Second Battle of Bassano	French Revolution: Revolutionary campaigns Battle of Calliano	Succeeded by Battle of Arcole
