= Battle of Caldiero (1796) =

Defeat of the French First Republic forces under Napoleon Bonaparte by a Habsburg corps

Battle of Caldiero, 1796
- Part of the Italian campaign of 1796–1797 in the War of the First Coalition
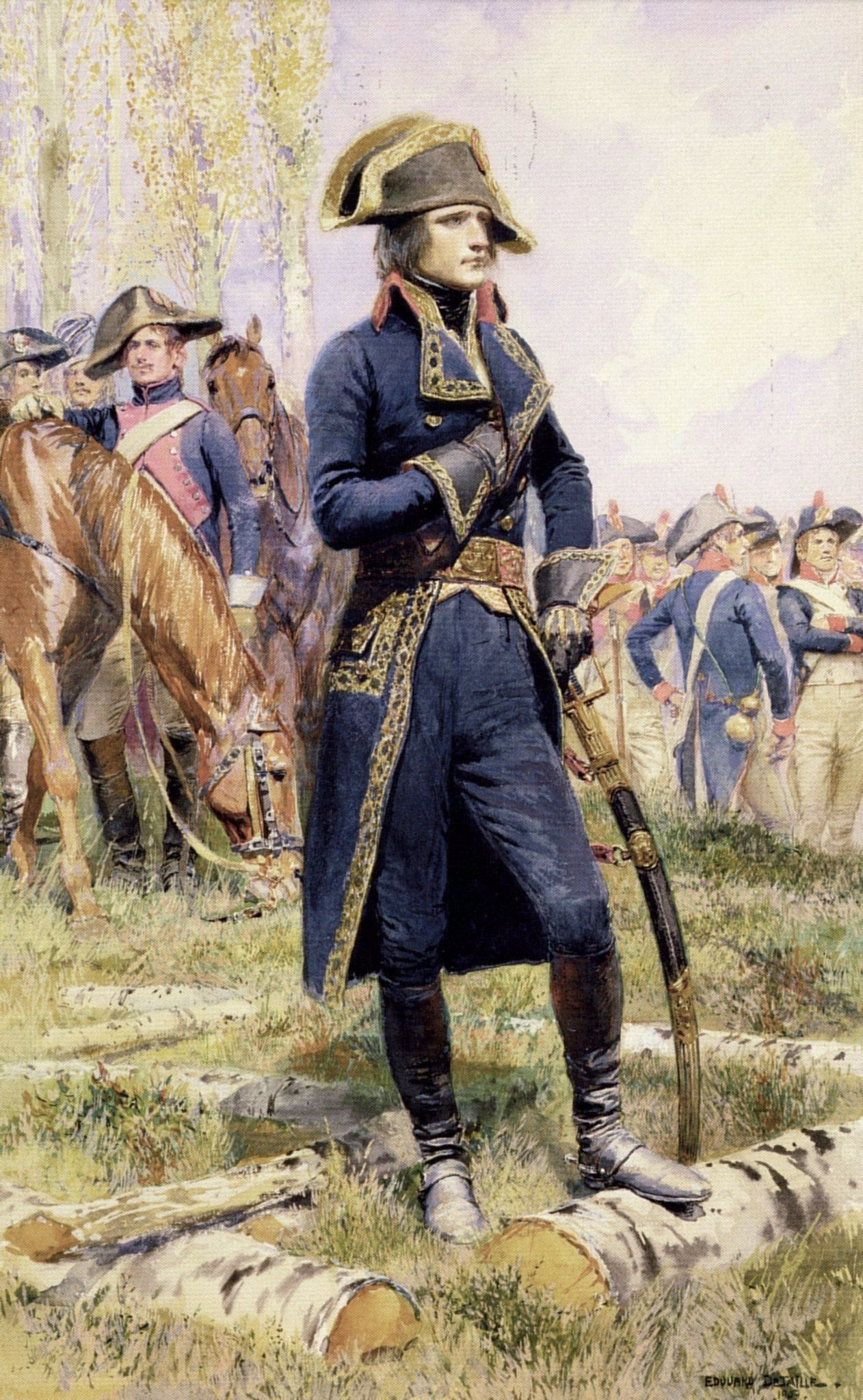
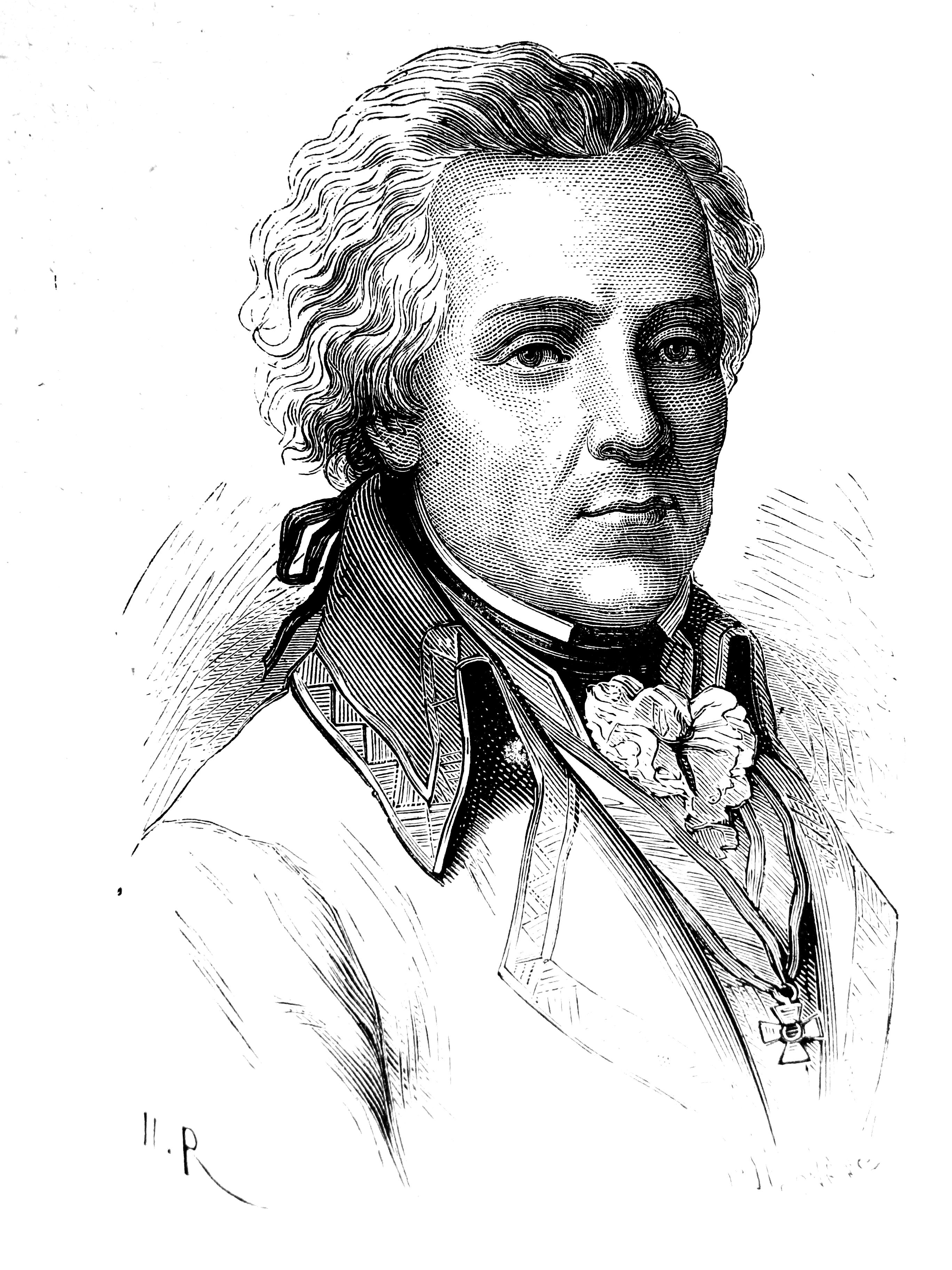
- Bonaparte (left) and Alvinczi (right)
| Date | 12 November 1796 |
| Location | Caldiero, in present-day Italy 45°25′N 11°11′E |
| Result | Austrian victory |

Belligerents
| French First Republic | Habsburg monarchy |

Commanders and leaders
| Napoleon Bonaparte; André Masséna; Pierre Augereau; Dominique Martin Dupuy | József Alvinczi; Prince Hohenzollern; Giovanni Provera; Anton Schübirz von Chobinin; Peter Vitus von Quosdanovich |

Strength
| 13,000 | 17,000–18,000 |

Casualties and losses
| 1,800–2,000 dead, wounded and captured; 2 guns | 1,300 dead, wounded and captured |

War of the First Coalition:
Italian Campaign
current battle
Napoleon as subordinate
Napoleon in command

In the Battle of Caldiero on 12 November 1796, the Habsburg army led by József Alvinczi fought a French First Republic army commanded by Napoleon Bonaparte. The French assaulted the Austrian positions, which were initially held by the army advance guard under Prince Friedrich Franz Xaver of Hohenzollern-Hechingen. The defenders held firm until reinforcements arrived in the afternoon to push back the French. This marked a rare tactical setback for Bonaparte, whose forces withdrew into Verona that evening after having suffered greater losses than their adversaries. The action occurred during the War of the First Coalition, which was part of the French Revolutionary Wars. Caldiero is a town located about 15 km (9.3 mi) east of Verona.

The battle was part of the third Austrian effort to relieve the Siege of Mantua. Two Austrian forces converged toward Mantua, the main army from the east and an independent corps from the north. Both forces enjoyed early successes, driving back the outnumbered French forces in front of them. When the main army reached a position threatening Verona, Bonaparte ordered the divisions of André Masséna and Pierre Augereau to attack. Sturdy Austrian resistance and bad weather contributed to the French defeat. Bonaparte soon embarked upon a new strategy which concluded with an Austrian defeat at the Battle of Arcole a few days later.

== Background ==
On 2 November 1796, Feldzeugmeister Jozsef Alvinczi launched the third attempt to raise the Siege of Mantua by crossing the Piave River with an army of 28,000 men and advancing west. At the same time, a second Austrian column under Feldmarschall-Leutnant Paul Davidovich moved south against Trento with 18,000 men. Alvinczi hoped to break through to the relief of Feldmarschall Dagobert Sigmund von Wurmser, who was trapped in Mantua with a 23,708-man garrison. Of these, only 12,420 were well enough to fight.

To face the twin threats, Bonaparte deployed a 10,500-man division led by General of Division Claude-Henri Belgrand de Vaubois against Davidovich in the north and General of Division André Masséna's 9,500-man division at Bassano on the Brenta River. In reserve lay General of Division Pierre Augereau's 8,300-man division at Verona and 4,300 in other units. General of Division Charles Edward Jennings de Kilmaine with 8,800 men blockaded Wurmser's garrison in Mantua.

On 6 November, Bonaparte with 19,500 men, including Massena, Augereau, and a reserve brigade, attacked Alvinczi at Bassano and Fontaniva. In the hard-fought Second Battle of Bassano, Alvinczi and his two division commanders, Feldmarschall-Leutnants Peter Vitus von Quosdanovich and Giovanni Marchese di Provera, repelled their outnumbered opponents. French losses were 3,000 killed, wounded, and captured, while Alvinczi's army suffered about 2,800 casualties.

Davidovich routed Vaubois in the Battle of Calliano on 7 November, inflicting 4,400 casualties on the French for an Austrian loss of 3,500. Bonaparte focused on the threat from the north as he pulled back his eastern force to Verona. Davidovich remained inactive because he was under the mistaken impression that Masséna's division had reinforced Vaubois.

== Battle ==
By 11 November, Alvinczi's advance elements reached Caldiero, east of Verona. Believing that Verona was being evacuated, Generalmajor Prince Friedrich Franz Xaver of Hohenzollern-Hechingen moved forward. But Bonaparte sent the divisions of Masséna and Augereau across the Adige River to engage the Austrians. Hohenzollern lost 400 men and pulled back to a ridge running north of Caldiero. Bonaparte determined to attack the Austrians the next day.

Bonaparte sent a total of 13,000 men to attack Hohenzollern's position. Masséna drove against the Austrian right and Augereau attacked the Austrian left, The Austrians, who had fortified themselves in several villages, sturdily resisted the French assaults. A violent rain and hail storm blew in the faces of the French troops, making it difficult for them to prime their muskets. At mid-day, Masséna began making headway on the Austrian right. In the afternoon, the brigades of Generalmajore Adolf Brabeck and Anton Schübirz von Chobinin arrived on the field. Soon the Austrians forced back Masséna. Provera also appeared and drove back Augereau. The arrival of nightfall allowed the French to pull safely back into Verona.

== Result ==
Actions leading to the Battle of Caldiero, Nov. 1796

The French suffered 1,000 killed and wounded, plus 800 men and two artillery pieces captured. The Austrians lost 950 killed and wounded, and 350 captured. Having failed to dislodge the Austrians, Bonaparte contemplated a retreat behind the Adda River and potentially abandoning the blockade of Mantua. But when the Austrians dawdled rather than taking advantage of their opportunities, the French commander determined to attack his opponent again. Stripping Vaubois and Kilmaine of every available man, Bonaparte fell upon Alvinczi at the Battle of Arcola on 15–17 November and defeated the Austrians.
