= Second Battle of Bassano =

1796 battle during the War of the First Coalition

- Part of the Italian campaign of 1796–1797 in the War of the First Coalition
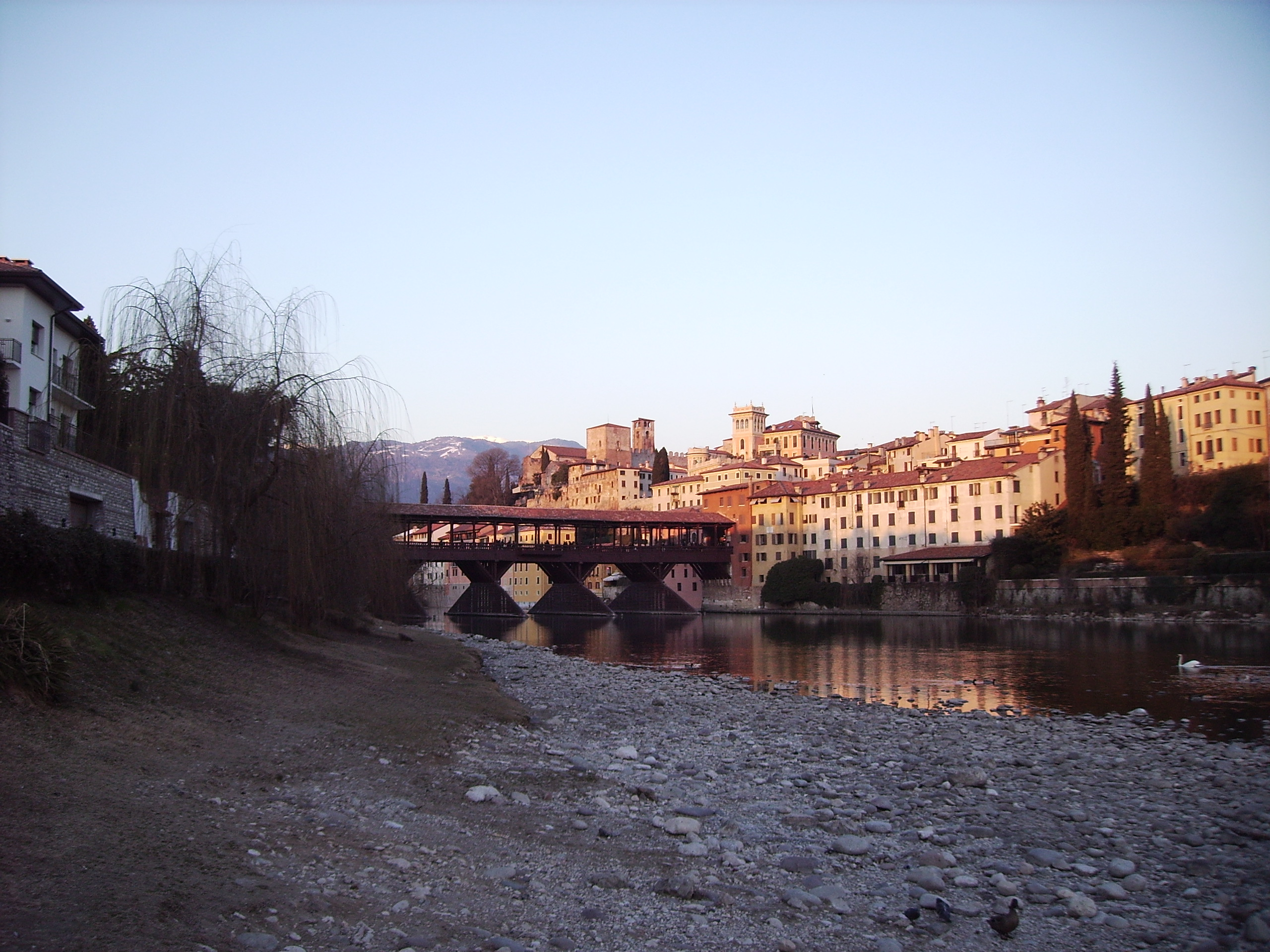
- View of Bassano with the Brenta
Date	6 November 1796
Location	Bassano del Grappa, in present-day Italy 45°46′N 11°44′E
Result	Austrian victory

Belligerents
French Republic	Habsburg monarchy

Commanders and leaders
Napoleon Bonaparte; André Masséna; Pierre Augereau	József Alvinczi; Anton Lipthay; Friedrich of Hohenzollern-Hechingen

Strength
19,500–21,000	28,000

Casualties and losses
3,000 dead, wounded and captured	2,823–5,600 dead, wounded and captured 2 guns
- Location within Europe

War of the First Coalition:
Italian Campaign
current battle
Napoleon as subordinate
Napoleon in command

The Second Battle of Bassano on 6 November 1796, saw a Habsburg army commanded by József Alvinczi fight Napoleon Bonaparte's French Army of Italy between Bassano del Grappa and Cittadella. The Austrians repulsed persistent French attacks in a struggle in which both sides suffered heavy losses. The engagement, which happened two months after the more famous Battle of Bassano, marked the first tactical defeat of Bonaparte's career and occurred near Bassano del Grappa in Northern Italy during the French Revolutionary Wars. The action was part of the third relief of the siege of Mantua during the War of the First Coalition.

== Background ==
See the Arcola 1796 Campaign Order of Battle for a list of the major units of both armies.

The second relief of the siege of Mantua ended dismally for the Austrians after General Bonaparte defeated Feldmarschall Dagobert Sigismund von Würmser's field army at the Battle of Bassano on 8 September. After the battle Würmser elected to dash for Mantua. He reached the place safely only to have his 12,000 remaining soldiers driven into the fortress by the French on 15 September. Within six weeks 4,000 Austrians died of disease or wounds in the overcrowded city.

Battles of San Michele, 2nd Bassano, and Calliano, Nov. 1796

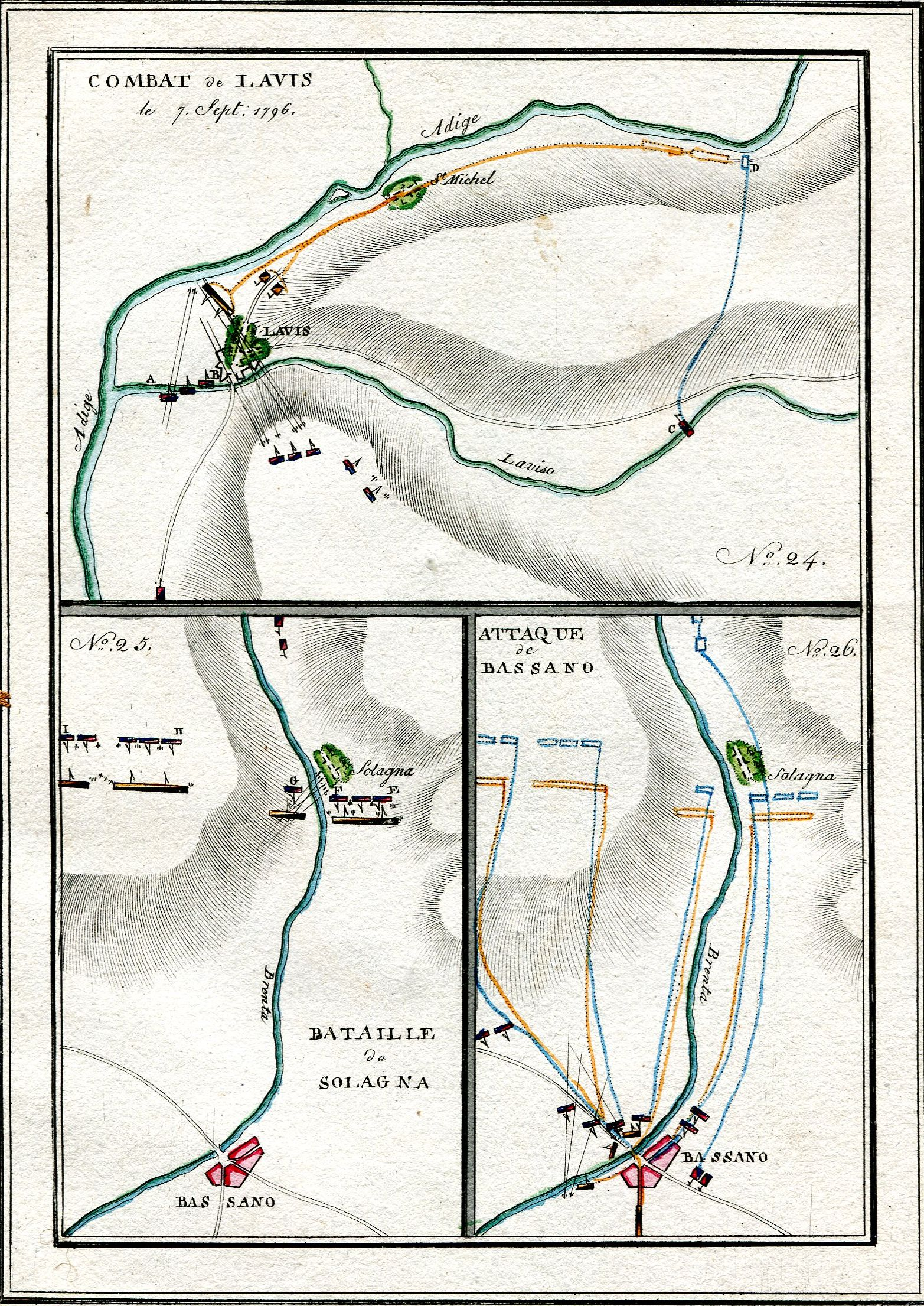
Battles of San Michele, Solagna and Bassano

Emperor Francis II of Austria appointed Feldzeugmeister Alvinczi to assemble a new field army and mount the third relief of Mantua. Alvinczi, Feldmarschall-Leutnant Paul Davidovich, General-Major Johann Rudolph Sporck, and Major Franz von Weyrother planned the new operation, which called for a two-pronged offensive. Alvinczi accompanied the 28,000-strong Friaul Corps, led by Feldmarschall-Leutnant Peter Vitus von Quosdanovich, as it advanced from the Piave River toward the west. Feldmarschall-Leutnant Paul Davidovich led the 19,000-man Tyrol Corps, which was in the upper Adige River valley.

To face these threats, Bonaparte deployed a 10,500-man division under General of Division Claude-Henri Belgrand de Vaubois in the upper Adige valley, 9,500 soldiers led by General of Division André Masséna at Bassano on the Brenta River, and the 8,300 troops of General of Division Pierre Augereau at Verona. General of Division Charles Edward Jennings de Kilmaine with 8,800 soldiers blockaded Würmser's large garrison in Mantua, with a reserve of 1,600 cavalry troopers and General of Division Francois Macquard's reserve of 2,800 foot soldiers.

Davidovich's column began moving at the end of October. On 2 November, his corps clashed with Vaubois' outnumbered division near Cembra in the north. By 5 November Davidovich pushed the French out of Trento. Vaubois fell back to Calliano.

On 1 November, the Friaul Corps began crossing the Piave. In the face of Alvinczi's westward advance, Massena pulled out of Bassano early on 4 November. General-Major Friedrich of Hohenzollern-Hechingen's advance guard soon occupied the town. Feldmarschall-Leutnant Giovanni Provera with two brigades reached the Brenta farther south near Fontaniva to form Alvinczi's left flank. Bonaparte determined to attack the Austrians and called for Augereau and Macquard to join Masséna in resisting Alvinczi on the Brenta.

== Battle ==
=== Fontaniva ===
Bonaparte accompanied Augereau's division as it advanced north-east from Vicenza to Bassano. Masséna took a more southerly road and clashed with the Austrian left wing at Fontaniva late on 5 November. General-major Anton Lipthay pulled his troops back to the east side of the river. This set the stage for the battle, which began on 6 November.

At 7 a.m. Masséna attacked Lipthay's brigade at Fontaniva. From morning until 6 p.m., the French mounted as many as ten assaults on the Habsburg general's four battalions, with heavy losses on both sides. The 2nd and 3rd battalions of Splényi Infantry Regiment Nr. 51 gallantly defended the river crossing, losing 9 officers and 657 men out of 2,000 soldiers during the fighting before they were replaced in line by the Deutschmeister Infantry Regiment Nr. 4. Injured when his wounded horse fell on him, Lipthay resolutely remained at his post. In the afternoon, Provera reinforced him with troops from the brigades of Generals-major Anton Schübirz von Chobinin and Adolf Brabeck as the Austrians successfully held their ground against the French attacks.

=== Bassano ===
Early in the morning Hohenzollern crossed the Brenta, followed by Quasdanovich's right wing. This wing included General-Major Anton Ferdinand Mittrowsky's brigade, which recently joined the army by descending the Brenta valley. The Austrians anchored their right flank in the Alpine foothills while their left flank curved back to touch the Brenta. Augereau's division began to arrive in the area in mid-morning and attacked Bassano in the early afternoon before all the Austrians crossed the river. After severe fighting, in which the village of Nove changed hands several times, the action ended at 10 p.m. One battalion of the Samuel Gyulai Infantry Regiment Nr. 32 suffered 390, or nearly 50 percent casualties. Though he issued a report claiming a victory, Bonaparte ordered a retreat that evening.

== Results ==
French casualties totalled 3,000, including 508 men and 1 howitzer captured. Austrian losses numbered 2,823 and two cannons captured. Provera's left wing lost 208 killed, 873 wounded, and 109 captured. Quosdanovich's right wing suffered 326 killed, 858 wounded, and 449 captured. Though Alvinczi ordered a pursuit, the fast-marching French successfully broke contact and retreated to Verona. On 7 November, Davidovich routed Vaubois at the Battle of Calliano. The two setbacks placed Bonaparte in a dangerous situation, as the two arms of the Austrian offensive threatened to close around him. Meanwhile, Würmser's large garrison remained in his rear.

Alvinczi continued to press ahead, sending Hohenzollern's advance guard to the outskirts of Verona by 11 November. The following day, Bonaparte unsuccessfully attacked the Austrians at the Battle of Caldiero. The French army commander's troubles were far from over. The deciding action of the campaign was the Battle of Arcole on 15–17 November.

== See also ==
- Siege of Mantua (1796–1797)
- Battle of Calliano, 7 November 1796
- Battle of Caldiero, 12 November 1796
- Battle of Arcole, 15–17 November 1796

== Notes ==
Preceded by Battle of Schliengen	French Revolution: Revolutionary campaigns Second Battle of Bassano	Succeeded by Battle of Calliano
