= Prince Friedrich Franz Xaver of Hohenzollern-Hechingen =

Austrian general (1757–1844)

Friedrich Franz Xaver Prince of Hohenzollern-Hechingen
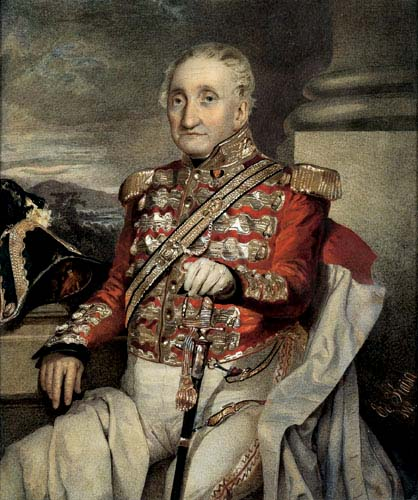
- Prince Friedrich von Hohenzollern (circa 1830)
- Born: 31 May 1757; Near Maastricht, Netherlands
- Died: 6 April 1844 (aged 86); Vienna, Austria
- Military career
- Allegiance: Dutch Republic; Habsburg monarchy Austrian Empire
- Branch: Imperial Austrian Army
- Service years: 1775–1815
- Rank: General of the cavalry (1809); Field marshal (1830)
- Commands: II Armeekorps; III Armeekorps
- Conflicts: See battles: War of the Bavarian Succession; Austro-Turkish War (1788-1791); Siege of Belgrade (1789); French Revolutionary Wars; War of the First Coalition; Flanders campaign; Battle of Neerwinden (1793); Battle of Wattignies; First Italian Campaign; Battle of Borghetto; Battle of Castiglione; Siege of Mantua (1796-1797); Second Battle of Bassano; Battle of Caldiero (1796); Battle of Arcole; War of the Second Coalition; Battle of Magnano; Battle of Cassano (1799); Battle of Modena (1799); Battle of Trebbia (1799); Battle of Novi (1799); Siege of Genoa (1800); Battle of Pozzolo; Napoleonic Wars; War of the Third Coalition; Ulm Campaign; War of the Fifth Coalition; Battle of Teugen-Hausen; Battle of Eckmühl; Battle of Aspern–Essling; Battle of Wagram; Hundred Days
- Awards: Knight’s Cross of the Military Order of Maria Theresa

Friedrich Franz Xaver, Prince of Hohenzollern-Hechingen (31 May 1757 – 6 April 1844) was an Austrian general. He joined the Austrian military and fought against the Kingdom of Prussia, Ottoman Turkey, and the French First Republic. He was promoted to the rank of general officer during the French Revolutionary Wars. Hohenzollern took one of the main roles in the Second Battle of Bassano and the Battle of Caldiero (1796). During the Napoleonic Wars, he led a division in 1805 and an army corps in 1809. He was Proprietor (Inhaber) of an Austrian cavalry regiment from 1802 to 1844.

== Early career ==
Born into the princely family of Hohenzollern-Hechingen near Maastricht on 31 May 1757 in the modern-day Netherlands, Hohenzollern first joined the Dutch army in 1775. A year later, he entered the Habsburg service in his uncle's regiment, the Friedrich Anton of Hohenzollern-Hechingen Cuirassiers # 4. He later fought in the War of the Bavarian Succession. In 1783 he married Maria Theresia von Wildenstein. He served in the Austro-Turkish War (1788-1791), becoming a Major in 1788. After fighting at Belgrade he was elevated in rank to Oberst-Leutnant in 1790.

== French Revolutionary Wars ==
=== War of the First Coalition ===
In 1793 Hohenzollern received promotion to Oberst (colonel) and fought at the battles of Neerwinden and Wattignies. The following year he was involved in the sieges of Landrecies and Charleroi. In 1795 he fought in the Army of the Upper Rhine.

In 1796, Hohenzollern became a General-Major and transferred to the Italian theater. During the Battle of Borghetto on 30 May, he rallied the defeated soldiers and mounted a counterattack on the French in Valeggio sul Mincio. This action won time for the army commander, Johann Beaulieu to organize an orderly retreat. During the Castiglione campaign, he commanded a brigade in the column of Johann Mészáros.

In the third relief attempt of the Siege of Mantua, Hohenzollern commanded the army's advance guard. He led his troops in a hard-fought victory over Napoleon Bonaparte during the Second Battle of Bassano on 6 November. At the Battle of Caldiero on 12 November, Bonaparte attacked Hohenzollern's advance guard with two French divisions. Though initially outnumbered two-to-one, he managed to repulse repeated enemy attacks until Austrian reinforcements arrived and drove the French back into Verona. He played a lesser role in the Battle of Arcole, after which the Austrians were forced to retreat. In April 1797, the Knight's Cross of the Military Order of Maria Theresa was awarded to him.

=== War of the Second Coalition ===
During the War of the Second Coalition, Hohenzollern again served in Italy. He commanded a brigade under Pál Kray in a battle at Legnago on 26 March 1799. He fought at the Battle of Magnano where he temporarily commanded a division. Played a diversionary role in the Battle of the Adda. He besieged the Milan citadel starting on 30 April and received its surrender on 24 May. On 12 June, with 4,300 soldiers, he attempted to block Jacques MacDonald's much larger French force at the Battle of Modena but was defeated with heavy losses. He also fought at the battles of Trebbia and Novi. He won promotion to Feldmarschal-Leutnant in October 1799.

Hohenzollern defeated Nicolas Soult at La Bochetta near Genoa on 9 April 1800 and at Sassello on 10 April. He participated in the Siege of Genoa under the overall command of Peter Ott. On 13 May, Hohenzollern defeated and captured Soult at Monte Creto, ending a series of successful French sorties. After the fall of Genoa in early June, Ott appointed him commander of the captured port. After Bonaparte's decisive victory at the Battle of Marengo on 14 June, Genoa passed into French hands again. Hohenzollern fought at the Battle of Pozzolo in December 1800. In 1802, he became the proprietor of Chevau-léger Regiment Nr. 2 and held the position until his death.

== Napoleonic Wars ==
=== War of the Third Coalition ===
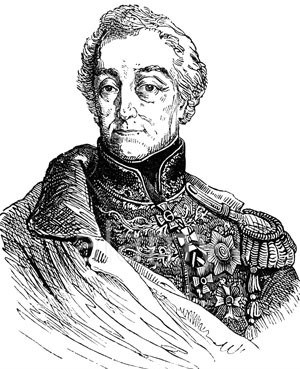
Prince Friedrich von Hohenzollern

During the War of the Third Coalition, Hohenzollern led a division in the corps of Franz von Werneck in Archduke Ferdinand's army. Deployed in southern Germany, the Austrian army was enveloped by Emperor Napoleon's Grand Army and crushed in the Ulm Campaign. Werneck tried to escape on the north bank of the Danube, but Marshal Joachim Murat launched a relentless pursuit. Hohenzollern's division fought on 16 October at Langenau and 17 October at Herbrechtingen. Murat caught up with the Austrians and surrounded them on 18 October 1805. When Werneck capitulated, Hohenzollern refused to obey the order to lay down his arms. Instead, he escaped into Bohemia with Archduke Ferdinand, Karl Schwarzenberg, and ten cavalry squadrons. His noble rank was raised from Graf to Prince in 1806, though he was not the reigning prince.

=== War of the Fifth Coalition ===
At the beginning of the War of the Fifth Coalition, Hohenzollern received appointment to the command of III Armeekorps in the south German theater. He led his corps at the Battle of Teugen-Hausen on 19 April 1809. He also fought at the Battle of Eckmühl on 22 April. After having traded corps with Johann Kollowrat, he led the II Armee Korps in the Austrian victory at the Battle of Aspern-Essling on 21–22 May. This was the third time that Hohenzollern participated in a defeat of Napoleon, a rare distinction in 1809. In the climactic Battle of Wagram, he continued to lead his corps. In August 1809, Emperor Francis II promoted him to General of Cavalry (full general).

=== 1812-1815 ===
Hohenzollern commanded a corps in Galicia in 1812. During the latter part of 1813, he led a reserve corps, so he missed the campaign ending in the Battle of Leipzig and the 1814 campaign. When Europe mobilized against France during the Hundred Days, Hohenzollern received command of the II Armeekorps in Schwarzenberg's army but he saw little action.

== Later career ==
Hohenzollern sat as president in the deliberations of the Hofkriegsrat (Aulic Council) from 1825 to 1830. He became a Feldmarschall on 18 September 1830. His wife Maria died in 1835. They had four children, Friedrich Franz Anton (1790–1847), Julia Fredericke (1792–1864), Friedrich Adalbert (1793–1819), and Josephine Fredericke (1795–1878). He died on 6 April 1844 in Vienna.

== Bibliography ==
- Bowden, Scotty & Tarbox, Charlie. Armies on the Danube 1809. Arlington, Texas: Empire Games Press, 1980.
- Boycott-Brown, Martin. The Road to Rivoli. London: Cassell & Co., 2001. ISBN 0-304-35305-1
- Chandler, David. The Campaigns of Napoleon. New York: Macmillan, 1966.
- Smith, Digby. The Napoleonic Wars Data Book. London: Greenhill, 1998. ISBN 1-85367-276-9

Military offices
Preceded by Count Heinrich von Bellegarde	President of the Hofkriegsrat; 1825–1830	Succeeded by Ignaz Gyulai
Preceded by Andreas Karaczay	Proprietor (Inhaber) of Chevauxleger Regiment # 2; 1801–1844	Succeeded by Friedrich Anton of Hohenzollern-Hechingen
