= Peter Vitus von Quosdanovich =

Austrian Empire general

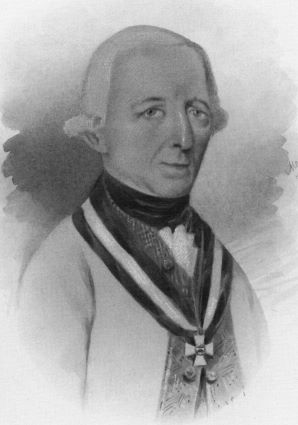
- Peter Vitus von Quosdanovich
- Born: 12 June 1738; Žumberak, Croatia, Habsburg monarchy
- Died: 13 August 1802 (aged 64) Vienna, Austria
- Allegiance: Habsburg Monarchy
- Service years: 1752–1797
- Rank: Feldmarschall-Leutnant
- Conflicts: Seven Years' War; War of the Bavarian Succession; Austro-Turkish War (1787–1791); French Revolutionary Wars; Battle of Handschuhsheim
- Awards: Military Order of Maria Theresa, Knight (1779), Commander (1795)

Peter Vitus Freiherr von Quosdanovich (Croatian: Petar Vid Gvozdanović; 12 June 1738 – 13 August 1802) was a nobleman and general of the Habsburg monarchy of Croatian descent. He achieved the rank of Feldmarschall-Lieutenant and was awarded the Commander's Cross of the Military Order of Maria Theresa. He played a major role in several battles against the French Army of Italy led by Napoleon during the French Revolutionary Wars.

== Early years ==
Petar Vid Gvozdanović was born in Žumberak, Croatia, Habsburg monarchy, and joined the Varaždin Grenz Hussar Regiment # 41 in 1752. He fought in the Seven Years' War. He distinguished himself in the War of the Bavarian Succession of 1778–9. He was promoted to colonel of the Slavonian Hussar regiment and decorated with the Knight's Cross of the Military Order of Maria Theresa. He fought during the Austro-Turkish War (1787–1791), becoming a General-Major and taking over the command of Alt Gradisca. He was a relative of Karl Paul von Quosdanovich.

== Wars with France ==
During the War of the First Coalition Quosdanovich first commanded a brigade, then a division. At the crucial defeat at Fleurus he commanded the second column. On 24 September 1795, while leading a division, he scored an impressive victory over two French divisions at the Battle of Handschuhsheim (now a district of Heidelberg). In July 1796 he transferred to Italy, where he led a corps under Dagobert Sigmund von Wurmser and József Alvinczi in four attempts to break the French Siege of Mantua. In the first, he lost the Battle of Lonato after a complicated series of maneuvers between 29 July and 4 August 1796. During the second relief, he participated in the Battle of Bassano on 8 September, but avoided being trapped in Mantua with Wurmser. In the third relief of Mantua he led the Friaul Corps in the Second Battle of Bassano and the Battle of Arcole. He led two brigades at the crucial Battle of Rivoli. He retired from the army in 1797 and died at Vienna on 13 August 1802.

== See also ==
- Croatian nobility
- List of Military Order of Maria Theresa recipients of Croatian descent
