= József Alvinczi =

Austrian field marshal in Habsburg Monarchy

Freiherr József Alvinczi
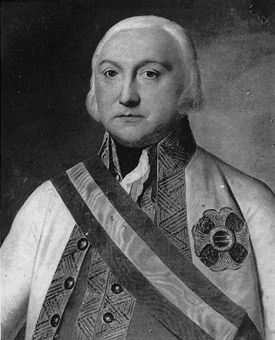
- Portrait of Alvinczi
- Born: 1 February 1735; Alvinc, Habsburg Empire
- Died: 25 September 1810 (aged 75); Buda, Austrian Empire
- Military career
- Allegiance: Habsburg monarchy Austrian Empire
- Branch: Army of the Holy Roman Empire; Imperial Austrian Army
- Rank: Generalfeldmarschall
- Conflicts: See list: Seven Years' War; • Battle of Torgau; War of the Bavarian Succession; Austro-Turkish War (1787–1791); • Siege of Belgrade (1789); Flanders campaign; • Battle of Neerwinden (1793); • Battle of Fleurus (1794); Italian campaign of 1796–1797; • Second Battle of Bassano; • Battle of Caldiero (1796); • Battle of Arcole; • Battle of Rivoli

Freiherr Joseph Alvinczi von Borberek also known as Baron József Alvinczi de Borberek (German: Joseph Alvinczy, Freiherr von Berberek; 1 February 1735 – 25 September 1810) was a soldier and an officer in the Habsburg Army and a field marshal of the Austrian Empire. He is remembered for handing Napoleon his first two defeats, at the battles of Bassano and Caldiero, both in 1796 and just days apart; moreover, the Austrian army consisted mainly of new recruits and inexperienced officers, and it had no internal cohesion. The Battle of Arcole was a hard-fought engagement in which Alvinczi managed to inflict a relatively large loss on Napoleon in killed and wounded, but Bonaparte gained the upper hand after three days of persistent fighting. By the time of the Battle of Rivoli, Alvinczi's health had deteriorated as a result of the winter campaign, and he was decisively defeated. Napoleon would later remark that Alvinczi was the best general he had fought thus far.

== Early career ==
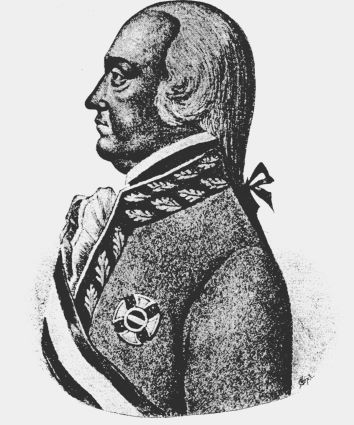
József Alvinczi

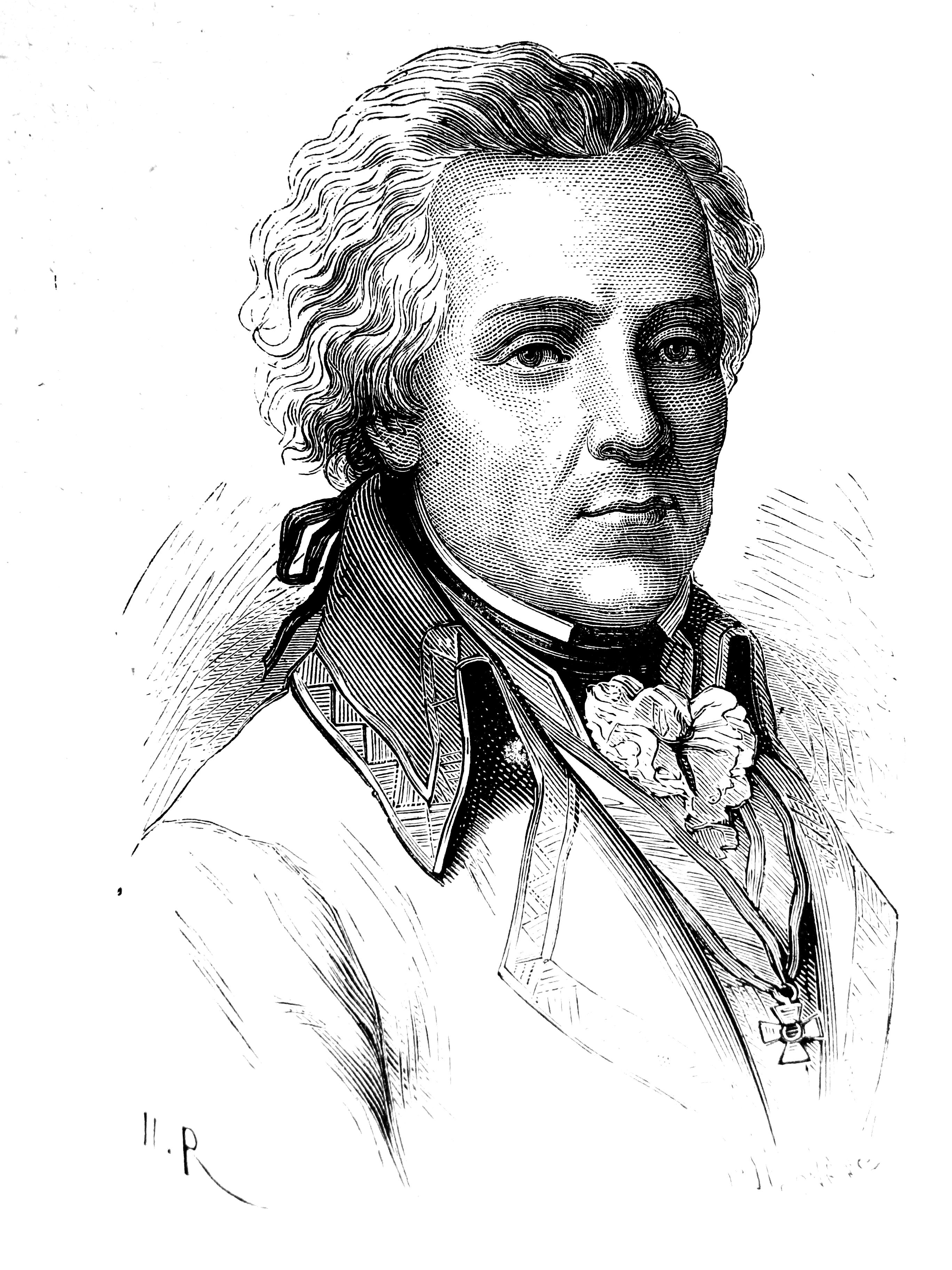
Alvinczi as depicted in the Album du Centenaire

An ethnic Magyar, he was born in Transylvania in a place called Alvinc (German: Alwintz), and spent his boyhood in the household of Graf Franz Gyulai before joining his regiment as a Fähnrich aged 14. By 1753 he had risen to Hauptmann.

During the Seven Years' War, Alvinczi distinguished himself leading a grenadier company in the battles of Torgau and Teplitz, where his courageous leadership won him a promotion to second major. At the end of the war he worked extensively on the implementation of Franz Moritz von Lacy's new regulations throughout the army.

== War of Succession, Turkish War, and the Netherlands campaign ==
Promoted to Oberst commanding the 19th Infantry Regiment 19 in 1774, he led his men during the War of the Bavarian Succession, where he took the Böhmertor, city of Habelschwerdt and captured the Prussian Commander Prince Hessen-Philippstal, a feat which won Alvinczy promotion to major general and award of the Militär-Maria Theresien-Orden (MTO).

Alvinczi fought under Ernst Gideon Freiherr von Laudon in the Ottoman War of 1787, but did not accomplish his mission of capturing Belgrade. After a short period instructing the future Emperor, Archduke Francis, he returned to command his regiment. After being promoted to Feldmarschalleutnant, he was transferred to the Austrian Netherlands in 1790 to suppress the United States of Belgium, until a fall from his horse forced him to retire.

== Neerwinden, Fleurus, Charleroi ==
Upon the outbreak of the French Revolutionary Wars in 1792, Alvinczy commanded a division, steadying his demoralised men at a key stage of the victorious battle of Neerwinden in 1793, leading his men forward to capture the village; for this exploit he was awarded the Commanders Cross of the MTO. He took command of an Auxiliary army which supported the British under the Duke of York and Albany, fighting at Landrecy and in the Battle of Fleurus, before being wounded at Mariolles.

On his recovery and promotion to Feldzeugmeister, Alvinczy advised the William VI of Orange in the successful relief of Charleroi in June 1793, losing two horses under him in the process, and earning the reward of the Grand cross of the MTO. Briefly commander of the Army of the Upper Rhine, he was recalled to Vienna to serve on the Hofkriegsrat in 1795.

== Italian campaign and later assignments ==
In late 1796 he took over command of the army that was fighting Napoleon Bonaparte in the north of the Italian Peninsula. After organising the Tyrolean militia to face the threat of the French advance in 1796, he was tasked with the third relief of the Siege of Mantua. Alvinczy's army was largely composed of new recruits with few experienced officers.

He defeated Bonaparte at Bassano on 6 November and Caldiero on 12 November. Ultimately, Bonaparte won a hard-fought victory over Alvinczi at the Battle of the Bridge of Arcole on 15–17 November 1796. After at first withdrawing toward Vicenza, the Austrians gamely reoccupied the field of battle on 22 November. But when he found that troops under his lieutenant Paul Davidovich had begun their own retreat, he admitted defeat and fell back to Bassano.

Despite deteriorating health, Alvinczy regrouped his forces for a final attempt to lift the siege of Mantua. In January 1797, he launched a new offensive but suffered a catastrophic defeat at the Battle of Rivoli on 14 January 1797. The defeat made the relief of the fortress impossible, and Mantua capitulated shortly thereafter. Consequently, Alvinczy was relieved of his command and replaced by Archduke Charles.

Following his dismissal, Alvinczy was appointed military governor of the Kingdom of Hungary. This position was widely viewed as a form of dignified retirement for defeated senior commanders; his predecessor in the role, Field Marshal Wurmser, had also been appointed governor following the surrender of Mantua, only to die months later from malaria contracted during the siege. Alvinczy, however, held the post for over a decade. In 1808, he was promoted to the rank of Field marshal (Feldmarschall) and was entrusted with the chairmanship of the commission created to reorganize the Austrian army. He died in Buda two years after his promotion, on 25 September 1810.

== See also ==
- Peter Quasdanovich
- Dagobert Sigmund von Wurmser
- Paul Davidovich
- Siege of Mantua (1796-1797)

== Sources ==
- Fiebeger, G. J. (1911). The Campaigns of Napoleon Bonaparte of 1796–1797. West Point, New York: US Military Academy Printing Office.
- Smith, Digby. The Napoleonic Wars Data Book. London: Greenhill, 1998. ISBN 1-85367-276-9
- Wurzbach, Constantin von. Biographisches Lexikon des Kaiserthums Oesterreich, 1856–91, vol I, p. 22
