= Battle of Bassano order of battle =

In the Battle of Bassano on 8 September 1796, Napoleon Bonaparte and his French Army of Italy routed an Austrian army led by Dagobert Sigmund von Wurmser. Afterward, Wurmser gathered the intact parts of his army and marched for Mantua. On 15 September, the French defeated the Austrians and drove them into the fortress. This raised the numbers of the underfed and malaria-ridden garrison to nearly 30,000 men. These actions and the Battle of Rovereto occurred during the second attempted relief of the Siege of Mantua.

== French Army ==
- Army of Italy: Napoleon Bonaparte (46,500)
  - Division: General of Division André Masséna (13,000)
  - Division: General of Division Pierre Augereau (9,000)
  - Division: General of Division Claude-Henri Belgrand de Vaubois (11,000)
  - Division: General of Division Jean-Joseph-François de Sahuguet (10,000)
  - Reserve: General of Division Charles Edward Jennings de Kilmaine (3,500)

== Austrian Army ==
Feldmarschall Dagobert Sigmund von Wurmser (43,000 available)

- Main Army: Wurmser (19,348)
  - Division: Feldmarschallleutnant Peter Quasdanovich (4,589)
    - 3,742 in 6 battalions, 847 in 6 squadrons
  - Division: Feldmarschallleutnant Karl Philipp Sebottendorf (4,086)
    - 3,787 in 6 battalions and 5 companies, 299 in 2 squadrons
  - Division: Feldmarschallleutnant Johann Mészáros von Szoboszló (10,673)
    - 7,365 in 10 battalions and 3 companies, 3,308 in 23 squadrons
  - Brigade: General-major Anton Schübirz von Chobinin
    - 2 battalions, 2 squadrons (at Pontebba)
- Corps: Feldmarschallleutnant Paul Davidovich (13,695, not including Loudon and Graffen)
  - Brigade: General-major Prince Heinrich XV of Reuss-Plauen (5,229)
    - 5,011 in 7 battalions, 218 in 2 squadrons (at Trento)
  - Brigades: General-major Johann Rudolf von Sporck and General-major Josef Philipp Vukassovich (8,466)
    - 7,840 in 12 1/2 battalions, 626 in 4 squadrons (at Roveredo)
  - Brigade: General-major Johann Loudon (2,409)
    - 1,841 in 2 battalions, 568 in 4 squadrons (in Valtellina)
  - Brigade: General-major Johann Graffen (3,451)
    - 3,451 in 4 2/3 battalions (in Vorarlberg)
- Mantua Garrison: Feldmarschallleutnant Joseph Canto d'Irles (17,259, fit for duty: 10,271)
  - Brigade: General-major Ferdinand Minckwitz
    - 6 battalions
  - Brigade: General-major Leberecht Spiegel
    - 4 battalions
  - Brigade: Oberst (Colonel) Sola
    - 3 battalions
  - Brigade: Oberst Joseph Sturioni
    - 4 battalions, 4 squadrons
  - Brigade: Oberst Philipp Brentano
    - 6 battalions
