= Claude-Henri Belgrand de Vaubois =

French Army officer (1748–1839)

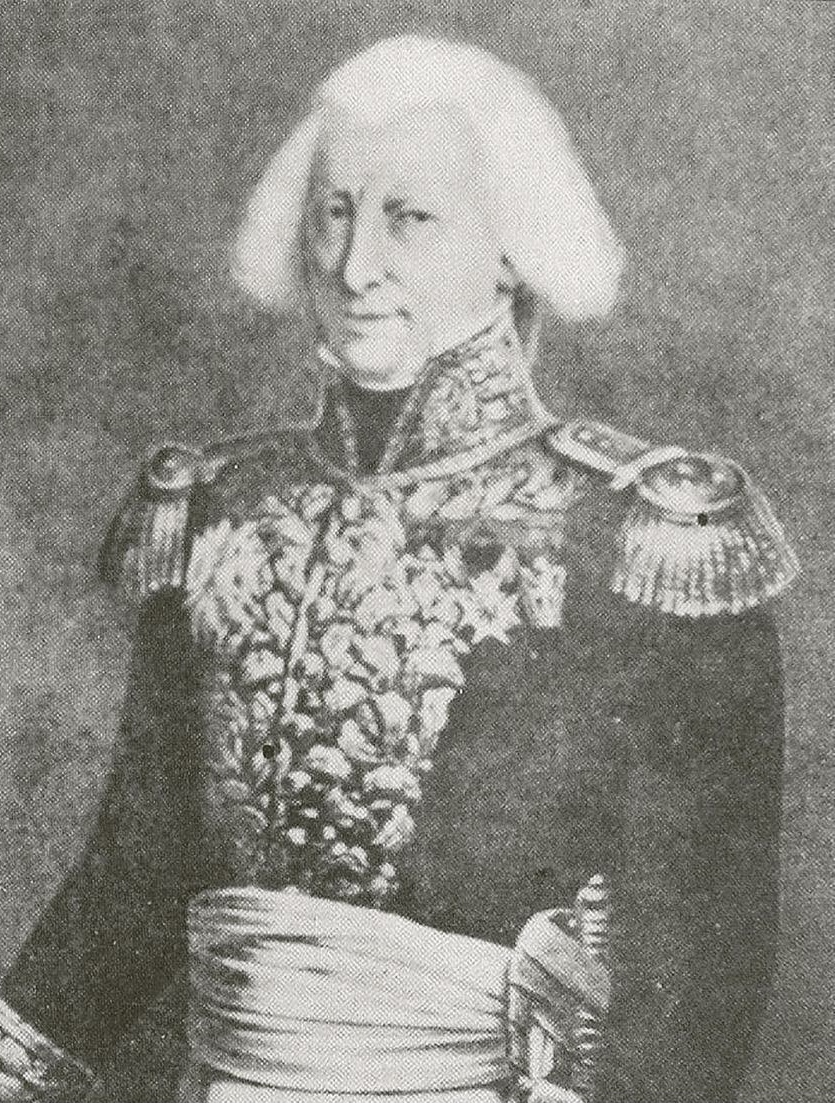
- Portrait of Vaubois
- Born: 1 October 1748; Clairvaux, Champagne
- Died: 14 July 1839 (aged 90); Beauvais, Oise
- Military career
- Allegiance: Kingdom of France; French Republic; French Empire
- Service years: 1768–1801
- Rank: Divisional general
- Conflicts: War of the First Coalition; Siege of Lyon; First Italian Campaign; War of the Second Coalition; French invasion of Malta; Siege of Malta

Claude-Henri Belgrand de Vaubois (French pronunciation: [klod ɑ̃ʁi bɛlɡʁɑ̃ də vobwa]; 1 October 1748 – 14 July 1839) was a French general of the Revolutionary Wars.

He led a division during Napoleon’s First Italian Campaign and commanded the Grand Harbour of Valletta from 1798 to 1800 during the Siege of Malta, eventually surrendering to the British.

Vaubois subsequently sat in the Senate under the Consulate and the Empire. Napoleon created him Count of the Empire in 1808. He served in the Chamber of Peers during the Bourbon Restoration. His name was inscribed on the Arc de Triomphe.

== Ancien Régime ==
Claude-Henri Belgrand was born in 1748 in Clairvaux, in the province of Champagne. His father, Henri Belgrand (1707–1792), was an ironmaster and tax collector for the Duchy of Châteauvillain on behalf of Louis de Bourbon, grandson of Louis XIV and Madame de Montespan. His mother, Anne (1712–1786), was the daughter of Abraham Febvre, who was also an ironmaster in the Arc-en-Barrois region. Through his mother’s family, Belgrand was connected to the regional nobility. (Note: Vaubois descended from the Vaillant de la Perrière family. According to their genealogy, their ancestor Tanneguy Vaillant, captain of the guards of Louis XII, married the illegitimate granddaughter of King Charles VI of France and his mistress Odette de Champdivers. Through his maternal ancestry, Vaubois was also related to the Armynot family. Originally from Brittany (their name is believed to derive from the ermine), the family settled in the Champagne region at the end of the fifteenth century, when the County of Vertus passed into the domain of the Dukes of Brittany.) He was also a distant cousin of Auguste de Marmont, Marshal of the Empire.

Known as Vaubois, Belgrand studied with the Oratorians in Troyes.. At the age of twenty, he entered the French Royal Army as an officer cadet at the Royal Artillery School of Auxonne.. Promoted to lieutenant in 1770, he was made captain in 1784 in the La Fère Regiment, where he met the young Napoleon in 1788.

== The French Revolution ==
In the autumn of 1791, shortly after the French royal family unsuccessfully attempted to flee the country, Vaubois was made a Knight of Saint Louis. His younger brother, a Knight Hospitaller, emigrated to Malta following the nationalization of his order's property. When their father died in September 1792, his ironworks were confiscated by the newly proclaimed French Republic. Despite being removed from the rolls of the Revolutionary Army, Vaubois enlisted in one of the volunteer battalions attached to the Army of the Midi, and was elected its commanding officer.

=== Army of the Alps ===
In the summer of 1793, his battalion was attached to the Army of the Alps, commanded by General Kellermann, the victor of the Battle of Valmy, who led the Republican forces during the Siege of Lyon. Kellermann appointed him provisional brigadier general on 3 August, a promotion confirmed by the National Convention on 6 September. At Lyon, Vaubois's columns captured the Pont Morand on 15 September, followed by the Brotteaux district the following week. The insurgents capitulated on 9 October, and the city was subjected to a severe repression ordered by the Committee of Public Safety.

At the end of 1793, as the Reign of Terror intensified with the passage of the Law of Suspects, General Kellermann was imprisoned. Vaubois, meanwhile, was sent to Savoy. The former duchy, annexed from the Kingdom of Sardinia, had become the department of Mont-Blanc. He took command of the troops stationed in the Tarentaise Valley and advanced southward, crossing the Alps into Piedmont. In September 1794, after fierce hand-to-hand fighting, he captured a strategic mountain pass, thereby opening the way into the Stura di Demonte Valley. Following his release by the Thermidorian Convention, Kellermann resumed command of the Army of the Alps in 1795. Vaubois was promoted to major general.

== First Italian Campaign ==
On 2 March 1796, Napoleon assumed command of the Army of Italy and won a series of victories over the Sardinians, forcing King Victor Amadeus III to abandon his alliance with Austria under the Armistice of Cherasco. In May, the Directory ordered General Kellermann to detach a division of 12,000 men to reinforce the Army of Italy, which was then advancing through Lombardy. The division was placed under Vaubois's command and joined General Sérurier's forces during the Siege of Mantua.

As Napoleon advanced toward Bologna, he ordered Vaubois to march on Reggio on 15 June. Following the armistice with Pope Pius VI, the commander-in-chief turned toward the Grand Duchy of Tuscany and occupied the port of Livorno on 29 June, where the French confiscated goods that the British had been unable to ship. Vaubois was appointed military commander of the city. On 20 July, Bonaparte reprimanded Vaubois in a letter, reproaching him for alienating Tuscan and Genoese merchants and for yielding to Commissioner Garrau’s demands by issuing a proclamation against the French émigrés.

On 6 August 1796, the day after the Battle of Castiglione, Vaubois was recalled to Bonaparte's side to replace General Sauret. The Austrian army, commanded by Dagobert von Wurmser, had withdrawn into the Tyrol. By the end of August, Bonaparte was at Rivoli with Masséna's 13,000-man division. On the right flank, Augereau's 9,000-man division occupied Verona. On the left flank, Vaubois's 11,000-man division was stationed at Salò, on the western shore of Lake Garda. Together with Sahuguet's division at Mantua and Kilmaine's reserve cavalry, the French army numbered 45,000 men, roughly matching Wurmser's strength.

On 1 September, the Austrians divided their army in two. General Davidovich was ordered to defend the Tyrol with 20,000 men, while Field Marshal Wurmser led the remainder of his forces—the divisions of Quasdanovich, Sebottendorf, and Mészáros—down the Brenta valley in an attempt to relieve the Siege of Mantua by outflanking the French positions.

Carl von Clausewitz was highly critical of the Austrian strategy in his study of the Italian campaign. Davidovich's forces were dispersed across three positions in the Tyrol, and only 14,000 of his men confronted the French around Trento. On 4 September, Vaubois drove back Prince Reuss at Mori, while Masséna defeated Vukassovich at Rovereto and then at Calliano. Nearly 10,000 Austrian soldiers were killed, wounded, or captured, including 3,000 prisoners. Davidovich was forced to retreat as far as San Michele. At dusk, Vaubois crossed the Adige and entered Trento at noon on 5 September, shortly after Masséna.

Having grasped Wurmser's intentions, Bonaparte set off in pursuit through the Brenta valley on 6 September. He left Vaubois's division at Lavis, where it was to contain Davidovich north of Lake Garda. Wurmser's army was routed at the Battle of Bassano on 8 September and fell back toward Mantua, where it shut itself up on 15 September.

Emperor Francis II entrusted Baron Josef Alvinczy von Borberek with the task of relieving Field Marshal Wurmser. On 22 October, 20,000 men marched from Friuli. In the Tyrol, Davidovich received reinforcements that raised his strength to 20,000 men. His orders were to join Alvinczy at Verona after securing control of the Adige valley.

Bonaparte believed that the French forces in the Tyrol still outnumbered the Austrians. On 29 October, Berthier ordered Vaubois to attack Davidovich and drive him back to Kaltern. On 2 November, his columns advanced toward San Michele, Cembra, and Segonzano. They encountered Vukassovich's forces and were compelled to withdraw the following day as Davidovich's corps advanced. Trento was abandoned on 4 November.

Louis Bonaparte reported the deteriorating situation to his brother. Napoleon blamed Vaubois for his tactical errors and poor knowledge of the terrain, and dispatched General Joubert to assist him in his retreat.

On 7 November, heavy fighting took place around Calliano. At four o'clock in the afternoon, panic spread through the French ranks when a column of Croatian troops outflanked them and attacked their rear. A disorderly retreat followed toward Rivoli. In five days, Vaubois's division had lost more than 4,000 men, while Austrian casualties were of a similar magnitude.

Davidovich hesitated, mistakenly believing that Masséna's division had come to Vaubois's aid. On 12 November, Bonaparte engaged Alvinczy at the Battle of Caldiero. Defeated, he was forced to withdraw to Verona. The poor coordination between the two Austrian armies gave the French a crucial respite. On the evening of 14 November, faced with the threat of encirclement, Bonaparte devised a bold plan and led his army across the southern bank of the Adige in an attempt to strike Alvinczy's rear during the Battle of Arcole.

Vaubois was ordered to hold his position at all costs. On 17 November, after ten days of hesitation, Davidovich attacked Rivoli. His forces quickly overwhelmed the French. One thousand soldiers, including brigadier general Fiorella, were taken prisoner. Vaubois narrowly escaped capture and withdrew to Peschiera.

After his victory at Arcole, which had forced Alvinczy's army to retreat, Bonaparte turned back and compelled Davidovich to withdraw into the Tyrol. He removed Vaubois from divisional command, writing to the French Directory that the campaign had shown him unfit to command in a war of manoeuvre, despite the numerical inferiority under which he had operated. Bonaparte replaced him with Joubert and reassigned him to the military governorship of Livorno.

A second offensive by Alvinczy culminated in the famous Battle of Rivoli in January 1797, which ended in a French victory. The Siege of Mantua came to an end on 2 February with Wurmser's surrender.

== Corsica ==
In April 1797, Vaubois was sent to Corsica to serve as its military governor, the island having been recaptured from the British six months earlier. His correspondence with the Directory shows the difficulties he encountered in enforcing the law on an island dominated by rival families engaged in vendettas.

Late in 1797, following the Coup of 18 Fructidor, the island's clergy and civil servants were required to swear an oath of "hatred of royalty and anarchy" and of "fidelity to the Republic". Opponents of the Directory assembled on 22 December 1797 at the Convent of Saint Anthony in Casabianca. There they resolved to take up arms and appealed to the eighty-year-old General Agostino Giafferi, son of Luigi Giafferi, who had presided over the parliament of the Anglo-Corsican Kingdom. The insurgents wore white crosses on their clothing. The uprising became known as the Crocetta ("Little Cross").

Within a few days, the revolt had spread throughout Golo, the island's northern department. Vaubois initially adopted a conciliatory approach, prompting local administrators to accuse him of collusion with the rebels. He eventually took the field during the second week of January 1798 at the head of a column of 1,680 soldiers, joined by volunteer auxiliaries. On 18 January, he defeated the insurgents at Murato. Two weeks later, Agostino Giafferi was captured with forty of his supporters at La Porta. Imprisoned in Bastia, he refused Vaubois's offer to spare him from the firing squad. Giafferi was executed on 21 February.

== Siege of Malta ==
In May 1798, Vaubois and his division joined the Armée d'Orient under the command of Napoleon.

=== French occupation ===
On 9 June, the French fleet reached the Maltese archipelago. The Grand Master of the Knights Hospitaller, Ferdinand von Hompesch zu Bolheim, whose order had governed Malta since 1530, initially refused the French access to the Grand Harbour of Valletta. On 10 June, 15,000 French troops landed. Vaubois came ashore at St. Julian's. His division was split into two columns: seven battalions under Lannes and five under Marmont.

In a proclamation addressed to the inhabitants, Vaubois declared that the free exercise of their religion would be guaranteed, that all those who remained peaceful would enjoy the protection of the French authorities, and that the clergy would receive special protection. These terms were accepted, the capitulation followed, and the keys of Valletta were handed over to Vaubois at noon. He then dined with Bishop Vincenzo Labini.

On 12 June, the Hospitaller plenipotentiaries formally accepted the capitulation aboard L'Orient, the flagship of the French fleet.

Eager to sail for Egypt without delay, Bonaparte issued a series of decrees inspired by the Constitution of Year III and by the measures adopted at Corfu the previous year.

The archipelago was reorganised into municipalities. A commission of nine members, whose presidency rotated every six months, was established to govern the islands, collect taxes, and administer the courts. The inhabitants were encouraged to wear the French tricolour cockade (Note: French citizenship was to be granted to Maltese inhabitants who distinguished themselves "by their attachment to the Republic, by some outstanding action, or by acts of benevolence or bravery.") and were disarmed, except for the battalions of the National Guard established in each municipality and recruited from the wealthiest inhabitants (Note: Sixty boys between the ages of nine and fourteen, drawn from the island's wealthiest families, were to be sent to Paris for their education. They were, in effect, hostages.)—those considered to have "the greatest interest in maintaining public order."

All property belonging to the Knights Hospitaller was confiscated. (Note: Gaspard Monge and Claude-Louis Berthollet were tasked with drawing up an inventory of the order's wealth.) Members of the order under the age of sixty were expelled, as were all inhabitants who were subjects of states at war with France. Each religious order was restricted to a single monastery within the archipelago. All foreign clergy were required to leave immediately, with the sole exception of the bishop.

The French abolished slavery, (Note: All enslaved Muslims were to be treated as prisoners of war. In view of the friendly relations between the Ottoman Porte and the French Republic, they were to be repatriated once the commander-in-chief had been informed that the beys had agreed to send all French and Maltese slaves in their possession back to Malta. In his Mémoires dictées à Sainte-Hélène (vol. II, p. 29), Napoleon stated that 700 Turkish and Arab slaves were emancipated in Malta and returned to their homeland. Nicolas Philibert Desvernois (Mémoires, p. 97) claimed that many of them were subsequently incorporated into the French navy and sailed to Egypt with the fleet.) the nobility, the feudal system, (Note: All coats of arms were to be erased, and the wearing of liveries or any other marks of nobility was prohibited.) and episcopal jurisdiction, restricted priestly ordinations, and instituted civil marriage. Protection was also granted to Jews wishing to establish a synagogue.

Bonaparte decreed the establishment of fifteen primary schools, and university chairs devoted to the sciences. Several projects were associated with this École centrale, including a library and antiquities collection, a natural history museum, a botanical garden, and an astronomical observatory. Some of the reforms also concerned public health. (Note: A sum of 40,000 francs per year was to be allocated to the maintenance of hospitals.)

Military command of Malta and Gozo was entrusted to Vaubois. In a letter to the Directory, Bonaparte wrote: "He commanded the landing and won over the inhabitants of the island through his wisdom and gentleness." Regnaud de Saint-Jean d'Angély was appointed Government Commissioner.

On 19 June, Bonaparte sailed for Alexandria, taking with him the Hospitallers' treasury (more than one million francs' worth of gold and silver). L'Orient and its cargo were sunk on 1 August by Horatio Nelson's fleet at the Battle of the Nile.

Bonaparte left Vaubois four line infantry demi-brigades (the 6th, 19th, 41st, and 80th), one light infantry demi-brigade, five artillery companies, and a medical unit. The force under his command totalled nearly 4,000 men, including 151 officers. His aide-de-camp was Subervie.

On 14 July 1798, to mark the anniversary of the Fête de la Fédération, the French invited the Maltese population to a grand republican ceremony. A French tricolour was raised atop a Tree of Liberty (symbol), and a step pyramid was erected for the occasion, from which Vaubois addressed a large crowd. The celebrations concluded with a ball at the Grandmaster's Palace and a fireworks display.

=== Maltese uprising ===
The French occupation quickly provoked widespread hostility among the Maltese. Popular discontent stemmed from several causes: the confiscation of much of the gold and silver from St. Paul's Cathedral, which was melted down into coinage to pay the garrison; the introduction of civil marriage and registration of births; the reduction of religious houses to a single monastery per order, resulting in the closure of numerous churches; the forced, uncompensated requisitions imposed by the occupiers; the suspension of pensions and daily charitable allowances; higher interest rates on loans; the severe financial losses caused by the departure of the Knights Hospitaller, who left behind substantial unpaid debts; the imposition of new taxes, in violation of the terms of the capitulation; and the closure of trade routes with Sicily by King Ferdinand I.

On 28 August 1798, three ships that had survived the Battle of the Nile—the Guillaume Tell, commanded by Admiral Villeneuve, and the frigates Diane and Justice, under Denis Decrès—arrived at Malta. Together with 325 reinforcements sent by the Directory, 1,900 officers and sailors increased the French garrison to nearly 6,200 men.

The destruction of Bonaparte's fleet by Admiral Nelson placed the French position in the archipelago in jeopardy, as communications with France and Egypt could be cut off at any moment. Vaubois sent an urgent request to the Minister of War, General Schérer, asking for reinforcements, food, gunpowder, and ammunition.

News of the defeat at the Battle of the Nile spread rapidly, and the uprising broke out on 2 September, when officials were sent to Città Vecchia to auction a tapestry belonging to a Carmelite church. The alarm bells rang from the church towers, and the French garrison at Città Vecchia was massacred.

In his Journal of the Siege of Malta, Vaubois blamed Government Commissioner Regnaud de Saint-Jean d'Angély, arguing that his uncompromising anticlericalism had inflamed the anger of the population.

On 4 September, the Maltese established a National Assembly. Emmanuele Vitale and Father Francesco Saverio Caruana were elected to lead the insurgents, whose forces numbered around 10,000 armed peasants. Three aristocrats—the Count of Manduca, the Marquis de Piro, and Count Teuma—were appointed as representatives of the people. They wrote to King Ferdinand I and Admiral Nelson requesting their protection.

Vaubois ordered all French troops to withdraw behind the walls of Valletta, where the National Guard was disarmed and identity cards were issued to the inhabitants. Extensive efforts were undertaken to restore the city's defences. (Note: Although Valletta's fortifications were formidable, they were in poor condition. Their great extent made them difficult to defend, and many works had fallen into disrepair or remained unfinished. The various forts—Manoel, Tigné, Ricasoli, and St. Angelo—as well as the lines of Vittoriosa, Senglea, and the Cottonera, were separated by the harbour, complicating their defence. The Cottonera Lines were the principal weak point. Their ditch had been only partially excavated, and their loss would have exposed the arsenal and the warships anchored in the Grand Harbour. The artillery was also in poor condition: many gun carriages had deteriorated under the sun and were unusable or close to it, while essential equipment for mounting the guns was lacking.) The French soldiers swore an oath to hold Malta or die defending it.

Vaubois seized the public treasury and the government stores in Valletta (the Monte di Pietà and the Massa Frumentaria). A compulsory loan, assessed in proportion to wealth, was imposed on the city's richest inhabitants. Vaubois guaranteed repayment by the French Republic, provided the contributors were not found guilty of conduct deemed hostile to the Republic.

=== Naval blockade ===
On 19 September, at Nelson's request, a Portuguese squadron commanded by the Marquess of Nisa anchored off the harbour of Valletta, marking the beginning of the Blockade of Malta. James Saumarez's British squadron, en route to Gibraltar, joined Nisa for three days. On 25 September, the Anglo-Portuguese forces sent Vaubois their first summons to surrender, promising to repatriate his troops to Marseille. He rejected the offer, replying: "The French do not understand that kind of language."

On 18 October, the Marquess of Nisa sent a second summons: "The French garrison should reflect on the reasons why it ought to be convinced that no hope of relief remains." Vaubois again refused, adding: "Your ship, Sir, approached the forts too closely this morning. I have the honour to inform you that I shall be obliged to open fire should it again come within such a distance."

Admiral Nelson left Naples and arrived off Malta on 24 October. He sent Vaubois a third summons, but the latter once again declined to capitulate: "As jealous of deserving the esteem of our nation as you deserve that of yours, we are resolved to defend this fortress to the last extremity."

On 27 October, the British captured the island of Gozo and took prisoner the 217 men of the French garrison. Nelson entrusted the conduct of the blockade to Captain Alexander Ball before returning to the court of Ferdinand I.

During the opening weeks of the siege of Valletta, the French launched several sorties against the insurgents in an attempt to gather provisions, but these proved unsuccessful and were discontinued to avoid further losses to the garrison.

Wishing to return to the mainland, Regnaud de Saint-Jean d'Angély slipped through the blockade during the night of 9 November in a small boat under cover of darkness. In his Journal, Vaubois harshly criticized the commissioner, writing that he had made "a study of disorganizing everything and spreading discouragement into every heart. ... At first he spoke only of putting everything to fire and sword; but as soon as he realized the seriousness of the insurrection, all this childish bravado gave way to fears that he sought in vain to conceal."

On 7 December, Vaubois rejected a fourth offer of capitulation from Alexander Ball. The French possessed enough wheat to last for a year, but their stocks of alcohol, beans, rice, and meat were sufficient for only a few months. Vaubois appealed for supplies to his friend Godefroy Redon de Belleville, the French consul at Genoa. He also wrote to the Viceroy of Sardinia and to Yusuf Karamanli, Pasha of Tripolitania. Most of this correspondence was intercepted, although a handful of vessels—mainly Genoese—managed to evade the blockade and enter the harbour of Valletta.

By the end of 1798, the French numbered about 4,000 men. They expelled 10,000 inhabitants from the city, whom they could no longer feed, while refusing to allow prominent citizens to leave, holding them as hostages in the hope of deterring the British from bombarding Valletta. The British nevertheless fired dozens of cannonballs into the city each day during the second half of December.

==== 1799 ====
On 15 January, Vaubois learned from a Greek informant of a plot to assassinate him. The conspirators, who had coordinated with the insurgents outside the city, were arrested and executed by firing squad. Writing to the citizen Belleville, Vaubois remarked: "It is now well proven that everyone who speaks Italian has deceit to the very tips of his fingers. ... The principal ringleader, who has already been shot, was a former pirate of Corsican origin."

Orders were issued to disarm the inhabitants of Valletta completely, with the military requisitioning even knives and hammers. Any violation was punishable by death.

On 12 February, Vaubois warned his troops: "Despite the exemplary punishment inflicted upon the conspirators, another outrage of this kind is still being plotted against the French. ... Let us redouble our vigilance, my comrades; let us keep our eyes constantly open. ... They are hatching schemes against us in the shadows. The English, fertile in treachery, furnish them with ideas; but they are weak and cowardly. Whatever action they attempt will lead only to their destruction." He also ordered that gatherings of more than three people be dispersed.

During the winter, scurvy began to spread, as the garrison subsisted almost entirely on salted meat and bread. Nutritional deficiencies also caused nyctalopia, leaving many soldiers unable to see after nightfall. Vaubois himself suffered from a severe inflammatory skin eruption.

A supply ship succeeded in running the blockade on 14 February. The following day, Maltese insurgents assaulted the walls of Valletta but were easily repulsed without a single French casualty.

On 19 February, Alexander Ball, who had been elected head of the Maltese government, sent Vaubois a fifth summons to surrender. The latter replied: "We lack absolutely nothing, and we await with confidence any enemy who may come to attack us."

Reports gathered by spies inside the city, together with testimony from inhabitants who had gradually been expelled, led Alexander Ball to believe that the French were on the verge of surrender. On 3 March, he wrote to Admiral Nelson: "Vaubois is insulted whenever he walks out; the garrison is very sickly, the scurvy begins to spread among them, and they have not any medicines."

On 4 March, four emissaries—one Englishman and three Maltese—requested permission to negotiate with Vaubois. He ordered the English envoy sent back and imprisoned the three "rebel spies". Ball protested in a letter: "I cannot but regard your conduct towards the envoys sent to you as a violation of the laws of war that will cast an indelible stain upon your character. ... I demand that these men, whom you have so unjustly detained, be restored to me, or I shall retaliate against every Frenchman whom I have taken prisoner. ... You appear to feel that your own situation is desperate, and you wish to involve everyone else in the same fate."

In the following days, a Genoese vessel succeeded in slipping through the blockade, bringing enough provisions to sustain the garrison for a further six months. Its merchandise was sold at exorbitant prices to speculators, whom Vaubois forbade from reselling it at a profit exceeding five percent.

Every available open space within the fortifications had been converted into vegetable gardens, while fishing supplied a small but essential source of protein. To relieve the suffering of soldiers afflicted with scurvy, Vaubois requisitioned, with compensation, all the lemons and oranges in the fortress. The population of Valletta, which had stood at around 40,000 in the summer of 1798, had fallen to only 9,000 one year later.

On 28 June 1799, Vaubois wrote to the Minister of War: "One sees nothing but walking corpses. Around twenty people die every day, and often more. I have been obliged to forbid the slaughter of horses and mules, as only a small number indispensable for the service remain. ... For several months we have been losing one hundred men each month to disease. What a scourge for so small a garrison."

Enemy artillery continued to bombard the city intermittently, but repeated attempts to storm the fortifications failed. In the countryside, the Maltese also suffered severe privations as a result of the blockade and depended on supplies furnished by the British. The number of peasants still bearing arms had fallen to six hundred.

On 19 August 1799, Vaubois refused for the sixth time to surrender. Four French sailors who had deserted from Valletta informed the British that he intended to escape by sea with his garrison. The return of the Marquess of Nisa's squadron, however, together with reinforcements dispatched by Admiral Nelson, persuaded Vaubois to abandon the plan.

On 6 September, the Marquess of Nisa was received, at his own request, inside the fortress by the French staff. Describing the meeting in a letter to the Minister of War, Vaubois wrote: "They could not utter a word of what they had come to say. ... They departed in disgrace after this absurd démarche, walking between two ranks of soldiers shouting at the top of their voices and inviting them to come and storm the place. ... I believe they have now abandoned any hope of seducing me, if indeed they ever entertained such an intention."

In the same letter, he described the suffering of the inhabitants of Valletta: "About three thousand people have died in the city. There are many walking skeletons. Their condition is dreadful."

On 5 October, the Marquess of Nisa sent Vaubois a seventh summons to surrender: "The steadfastness and perseverance with which you have maintained yourself in Valletta for more than a year, Sir, certainly deserve praise... Yet everything has its limits, beyond which what was once called virtue becomes imprudence and recklessness."

British reinforcements—800 soldiers and 400 Royal Marines under General Thomas Graham—landed on Malta on 27 December. Russian troops were also expected but never arrived.

==== 1800 ====
During the winter of 1800, conditions for the French garrison deteriorated further as food rations were reduced.

On 7 February, a convoy carrying supplies and 4,000 troops sailed from Toulon under the command of Jean-Baptiste Perrée. At the same time, Admirals Keith and Nelson left Palermo with 1,200 Sicilian troops, who landed on Malta on 16 February. The following day, the French convoy arrived and was pursued by the Royal Navy. In the ensuing Battle of the Malta Convoy, the British intercepted the French flagship, Généreux. Jean-Baptiste Perrée was killed in the engagement. Around 2,000 French soldiers were taken prisoner, while the remaining vessels turned back.

The failure of the expedition shattered the morale of the garrison, which abandoned all hope of being rescued. On 26 February, Vaubois relieved General Étienne Brouard of his command, declaring: "This senior officer, disregarding the authority entrusted to me, has for some time given repeated proof of insubordination, and yesterday, despite my express prohibition, circulated among the corps and detachments of the garrison a printed address signed by himself whose sole purpose was to inflame men's minds."

On 6 March 1800, a merchant vessel from Marseille succeeded in slipping through the blockade, bringing salted meat, wine, and brandy, together with news of Napoleon's Coup of 18 Brumaire.

On 30 March 1800, the Guillaume Tell, the last surviving ship of the line from the Battle of the Nile, attempted to break through the blockade. Commanded by Vice Admiral Denis Decrès, she carried about 1,000 sailors, 200 sick men to be repatriated. The French ship fought stubbornly but lost its mainmast after two hours of combat. Wounded, Decrès was forced to strike his colours and surrender to the British.

Throughout the spring of 1800, the garrison of Valletta subsisted almost entirely on bread and olive oil. On 8 June, a small vessel from Toulon evaded the British blockade and delivered provisions, which Vaubois rationed with the intention of making them last for three months. He also attempted to expel 2,000 of the 6,000 starving civilians still inside the fortress, but General Thomas Graham refused to allow them to leave.

On 17 July, a further 1,500 British troops landed under the command of General Henry Pigot. Pigot sent Vaubois an eighth summons to surrender, to which he replied: "We believe we still have much to accomplish. The capture of Malta requires a large army. Our position may be prolonged for a long time yet, and we shall not commit the crime of shortening it by a single moment. Our resistance will surely earn your esteem."

The following day, Vaubois wrote to Napoleon: "Time is pressing. I see the moment approaching when we shall have nothing but bad bread, and I fear the epidemic caused by worms; it is already beginning to appear."

By August, the garrison's diet consisted solely of bread and biscuits, with a ration of wine every three days, vinegar every five days, brandy and pasta every ten days, and bacon every fifteen days. By the end of the month, famine and dysentery were claiming dozens of lives each day.

On 2 September, Vaubois convened a council of war, which resolved to surrender. Two days later, he opened negotiations with General Henry Pigot and, together with Admiral Villeneuve, signed the capitulation on 5 September 1800. Refusing to negotiate with the leader of the Maltese insurgents, Vaubois declined to include Alexander Ball in the talks.

After a siege of two years, the 2,800 surviving members of the French garrison marched out of Valletta with the honours of war—drums beating, colours flying, and with permission to retain their arms and personal belongings. They were transported to Marseille (or Toulon in the case of the sailors) aboard British ships.

The Peace of Amiens, concluded between Napoleon and the United Kingdom in 1802, provided for the restoration of the archipelago to the Knights Hospitaller. That part of the treaty was never implemented, however, and Malta remained under British rule until 1964.

== Later life ==
Belgrand de Vaubois returned to France on 23 September 1800. His steadfast defence of Malta during the two-year siege was celebrated by the French authorities. On Bonaparte's recommendation, he had already been appointed to the Senate on 27 July. He retired from active military service on 30 November 1801, after thirty-three years in the army.

He was serving as one of the Senate's secretaries when Bonaparte was proclaimed Consul for Life on 2 August 1802. The following year, he was appointed to the Sénatorerie of Poitiers and was granted the Castle of the Dukes of La Tremoille.

On 15 July 1804, two months after the proclamation of the Empire, Napoleon held the first Legion of Honour investiture ceremony at the Hôtel des Invalides. Vaubois was appointed a Grand Officer, the highest rank in the order at the time of its creation. He was created a Count of the Empire on 20 August 1808.

Vaubois was recalled to military service in the summer of 1809 during the British expedition to Walcheren. He was given command of the Ostend Division, composed of National Guard units from the Somme, Nord, and Pas-de-Calais departments. Ravaged by malaria, the British expeditionary force re-embarked in December, and Vaubois returned to civilian life without seeing combat.

On 2 April 1814, as the invasion of France by the Sixth Coalition culminated in the capture of Paris, the Senate declared Napoleon deposed and rallied to Louis XVIII. Under the Constitutional Charter, promulgated on 4 June 1814, the Senate was replaced by the Chamber of Peers. Count Vaubois was appointed a life peer by the King.

In March 1815, following Napoleon's return to France, Vaubois ignored a letter from Marshal Davout inviting him to rejoin the Emperor in Paris.

During the Allied occupation of France after the Battle of Waterloo, Vaubois wrote to the Duke of Wellington to complain about the pillaging committed by Allied troops. Wellington replied :

"The fact is, General, that by carrying her arms into foreign lands France also carried misfortune, devastation, and ruin. I myself witnessed the destruction of property throughout entire provinces that refused to submit to the tyrant's yoke and had consequently been abandoned owing to the operations of war. Although personal vengeance should never motivate a man—and certainly not the Allied sovereigns—one can scarcely expect soldiers, men drawn from the poorest and most industrious classes of society, who have seen their own property or that of their relatives burned, plundered, and destroyed by the French, to show great respect for French property when, through the fortunes of war, they find themselves in France."

Louis XVIII rewarded Vaubois for his loyalty during the Hundred Days by confirming his peerage and making it hereditary on 19 August 1815. In December, Vaubois voted in favour of the death sentence for Marshal Ney on charges of high treason.

A supporter of the liberal opposition led by Benjamin Constant and the Marquis de Lafayette, Vaubois opposed the policies of Joseph de Villèle. After the coronation of Charles X of France in 1825, increasing deafness and declining health led him to retire to his Château de Courcelles.

Claude-Henri Belgrand de Vaubois died on 14 July 1839 at the age of ninety. He was buried in Beauvais.

His name is among the 660 inscribed on the Arc de Triomphe, inaugurated in Paris in 1836. (Note: South pillar, column 24.)

== Marriages and issue ==
On 10 November 1788, Vaubois married Marie-Ursule de Barthélemy (1763–1800), who died only a few weeks before his return from Malta. They had one daughter, Marie-Thérèse (1789–1852), whose godfather was the Duke of Penthièvre and whose godmother was the Princess of Lamballe, Superintendent of the Household of Queen Marie Antoinette. In 1808, she married Count Georges Aubert du Petit-Thouars (1784–1871).

On 16 September 1801, at the Château de Courcelles, Vaubois married Catherine-Françoise de Gantelet d'Asnières de Veigy as his second wife. She was the daughter of the Baron of Veigy, who before the French Revolution had served as equerry to the future Charles X of France. She bore him three daughters and, like his first wife, died in her thirty-seventh year.

In 1803, after returning unexpectedly early from a stay in the countryside, Vaubois discovered his wife in possession of a love letter signed by General Marmont. He asked Napoleon for permission to fight a duel with his distant cousin, but the request was refused.

As Vaubois left no male heir, one of his sons-in-law, Casimir Le Poittevin de La Croix (1795–1871), was authorised in 1829 to assume the surname Vaubois. His son-in-law's nephew and son-in-law, Louis-Joseph de La Croix-Vaubois, a general in the Imperial Guard of Napoleon III, was authorised by decree of 1 August 1870 to revive the title of Count.

Claude-Henri Belgrand de Vaubois was the great-uncle of Eugène Belgrand, designer of Paris's water supply and sewerage system under the Second French Empire.

== Honours ==
- Knight of the Order of Saint Louis (1791)
- Grand Officer of the Legion of Honour (1804)
- Commander of the Order of the Iron Crown (1805)

== Bibliography ==
- Hardman, William; Holland, John (1909). A History of Malta During the Period of the French and British Occupations, 1798–1815. London: Longmans, Green, and Co.
- Chandler, David. Dictionary of the Napoleonic Wars. New York: Macmillan, 1979. ISBN 0-02-523670-9
- Fiebeger, G. J. (1911). The Campaigns of Napoleon Bonaparte of 1796–1797. West Point, New York: US Military Academy Printing Office.
- Annuaire de la noblesse de France et des maisons souveraines de l'Europe. Paris.
