= Battle of Bassano =

1796 battle during the War of the First Coalition

- Part of the Italian campaign of 1796–1797 in the War of the First Coalition
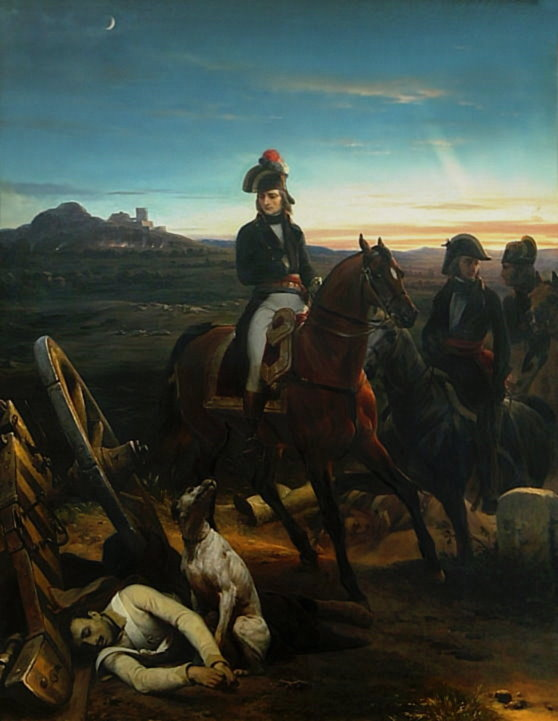
- Bonaparte after the Battle of Bassano, by Horace Vernet (1848)
| Date | 8 September 1796 |
| Location | Bassano, Venetia, present-day Italy 45°46′02″N 11°44′13″E |
| Result | French victory |

Belligerents
| French First Republic | Habsburg monarchy |

Commanders and leaders
| Napoleon Bonaparte; André Masséna; Jean Lannes | Dagobert Sigmund von Wurmser |

Strength
| 20,000 | 20,000 |

Casualties and losses
| 400 killed, wounded or missing | 600 killed or wounded 6,000 captured 30 cannons, 8 standards |
- Location within Europe

War of the First Coalition:
Italian Campaign
current battle
Napoleon as subordinate
Napoleon in command

The Battle of Bassano was fought on 8 September 1796, during the French Revolutionary Wars, in the territory of the Republic of Venice, between a French army under Napoleon Bonaparte and Austrian forces led by Count Dagobert von Wurmser.

The engagement occurred during the second Austrian attempt to raise the siege of Mantua. It was a French victory; however, it was the last battle in Napoleon's perfect military career as two months later he would be defeated at the Second Battle of Bassano, ending his victorious streak. The Austrians abandoned their artillery and baggage, losing supplies, cannons, and battle standards to the French. The victory led to Wurmser being trapped in Mantua, but Napoleon would find his army now badly overstretched, due to holding both Trento and Bassano, meaning he could not support either of those locations without being drawn too far away from the other, something that would nearly allow the Austrians to win during the third attempt to raise the siege of Mantua in November.

== Background ==
=== Austrian plans ===
The first relief of Mantua failed at the battles of Lonato and Castiglione in early August. The defeat caused Wurmser to retreat north up the Adige River valley. Meanwhile, the French reinvested the Austrian garrison of Mantua.

Ordered by Emperor Francis II to relieve Mantua at once, Feldmarschall Wurmser and his new chief-of-staff Feldmarschal-Leutnant (FML) Franz von Lauer drew up a strategy. Leaving FML Paul Davidovich and 13,700 soldiers to defend Trento and the approaches to the County of Tyrol, Wurmser directed two divisions east then south down the Brenta valley. When he joined the large division of Johann Mészáros at Bassano, he would have 20,000 men. From Bassano, Wurmser would move on Mantua, while Davidovich probed the enemy defenses from the north, looking for a favorable opportunity to support his superior. Lauer predicted that the French, having suffered recent losses, would be unable to react in time. Unknown to the Austrians, the French government desired that General Bonaparte cross the Alps to join the army of General Jean Moreau in southern Germany.

=== Forces ===
See Bassano 1796 Campaign Order of Battle for a list of French and Austrian army units.

=== Geography ===
In 1796, there were only three practicable routes between Trento and the Po River basin. The first route lay west of Lake Garda. The second route was the road down the Adige valley east of Lake Garda and north of Verona. The third route went east through Levico Terme and Borgo Valsugana, then followed the Brenta River valley (Valsugana) southward to Bassano del Grappa. An army that held both Trento and Bassano could move troops and supplies between the two places free from French interference.

=== Operations ===
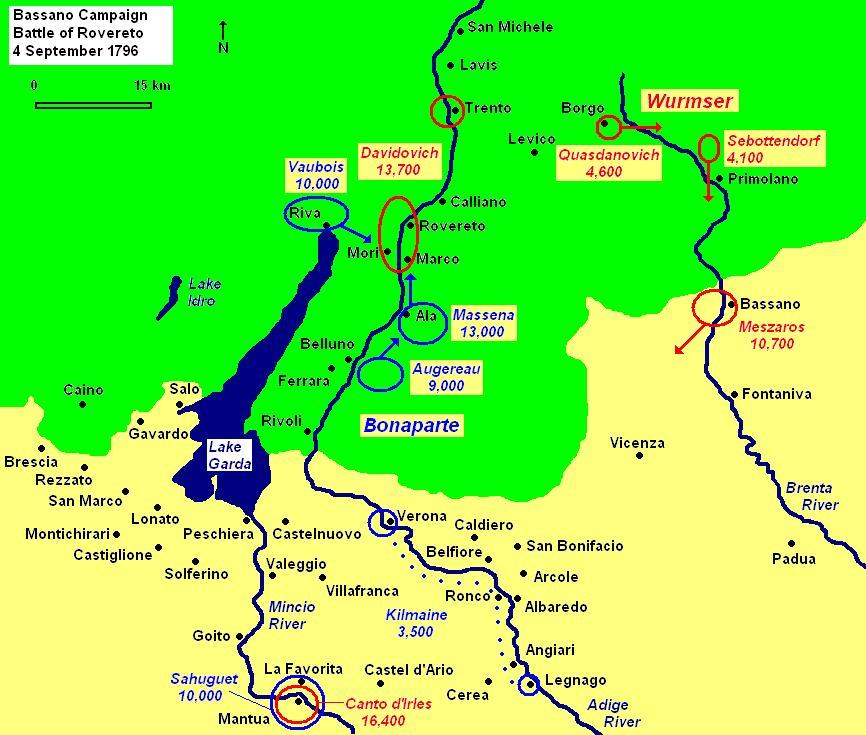
Battle of Rovereto, 4 Sept 1796

Bonaparte posted General of Division Claude Vaubois with 10,000 men on the west side of Lake Garda. General of Division André Masséna defended the Adige River valley with 13,000 troops and General of Division Pierre Augereau covered Verona with 10,000 more. General of Division Charles Kilmaine maintained the blockade of Mantua with General of Division Jean Sahuguet's division of 8,000 soldiers and held a 2,000 man reserve at Verona. Another source gave Vaubois 11,000, Massena 13,000, Augereau 9,000, Sahuguet 10,000, and Kilmaine 3,500 soldiers.

After Castiglione, Bonaparte had rearranged his intelligence gathering: the French representative in Venice, Lallement, was sent money to pay for spies to check out the areas between Venice and Trent and Bonaparte's station chief, Angelo Pico, based at Peschiera, sent his men forward into the Tyrol. More importantly, his spy Francesco Toli had penetrated Austrian headquarters and forewarned Bonaparte that Wurmser had left Davidovich at Trento. So, Bonaparte struck first, sending Masséna and Augereau north toward Trento. Meanwhile, Vaubois advanced past Lake Idro to Riva at the north end of Lake Garda. Vaubois and Masséna converged on Rovereto on the Adige. At the Battle of Rovereto on 4 September, the French routed Davidovich's outnumbered troops, inflicting 3,000 casualties at a cost of 750 killed and wounded.

Finding that Wurmser had moved toward Bassano, Bonaparte abandoned the plan to link with Moreau. Leaving Vaubois to observe the fleeing Austrians in the upper Adige valley, the French army commander decided to take a bold but risky course of action. Cutting loose from his supply line, he ordered Augereau, followed by Masséna, to the east into the Brenta valley. On 7 September, Augereau's 8,200 soldiers overwhelmed the 2,800 to 4,000 Austrians of Wurmser's rear guard at Primolano (6 km north of Cismon del Grappa), capturing 1,500 men and their commander Oberstleutnant Alois von Gavasini. The victorious French then followed the valley as it turned south toward Bassano.

== Battle ==
=== Bassano ===
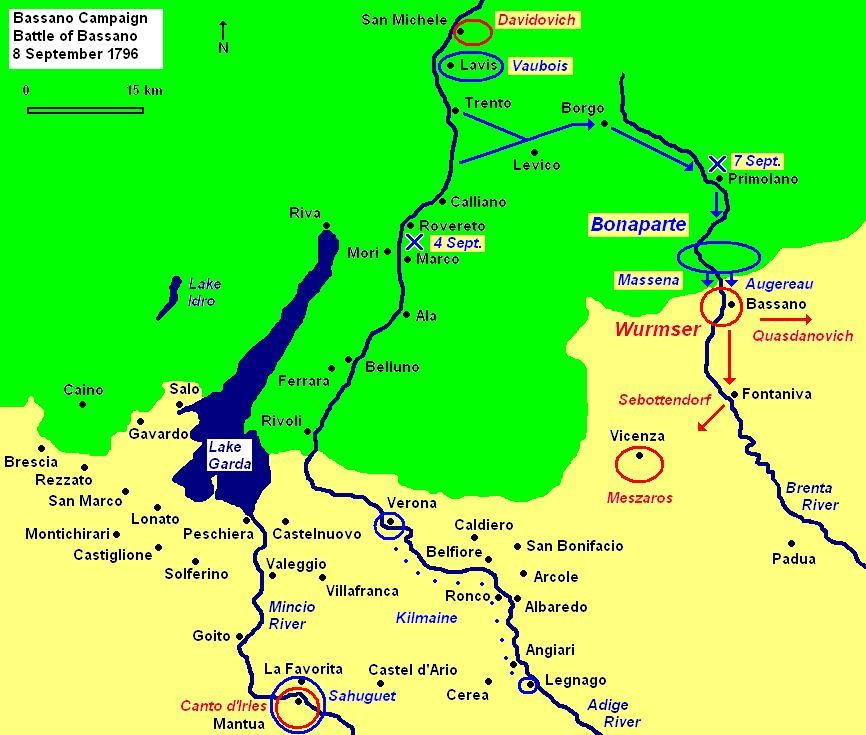
Battle of Bassano, 8 Sept 1796

Despite being surprised by the French rapid advance, Wurmser had gathered up 20,000 men the day before the collision took place.

On 8 September, 20,000 French soldiers fell upon Wurmser from the north. First, they attacked the 3,800-man Austrian rearguard under FML Peter Quasdanovich and General-Major (GM) Adam Bajalics. Bonaparte sent Masséna down the west bank of the Brenta and Augereau down the east bank. Overwhelmed by repeated attacks and pursued by Colonel Joachim Murat's cavalry, the rearguard collapsed and Bajalics was captured. Wurmser deployed one brigade on the west bank, a second brigade on the east bank, and a third in Bassano. Colonel Jean Lannes led a successful charge which broke the Austrian lines and burst into the town. Quasdanovich later assumed command over the defeated Austrians who retreated east, but 3,500 soldiers of FML Karl Sebottendorf's division fell back to the south with their army commander.

The French suffered 400 killed, wounded, and missing. Wurmser lost 600 killed and wounded. Between 2,000 and 6,000 Austrians, eight colors and 30 artillery pieces were captured. The vigorous French pursuit also seized a bridging train plus 200 limbers and ammunition wagons.

=== Race for Mantua ===
Race for Mantua, 9–15 Sept 1796

Wurmser unexpectedly headed west toward Mantua and joined the division of Mészáros at Vicenza. Immediately, Bonaparte sent his two divisions after the Austrians, hoping to cut them off. Masséna advanced southwest from Vicenza while Augereau moved south to Padua to close the Austrian escape route to the east. General-Major Peter Ott distinguished himself by leading Wurmser's vanguard in the race for Mantua. A French battalion holding Legnago abandoned its post, allowing the Austrians passage across the Adige. Wurmser left 1,600 men to hold the city and continued his march. On 11 September, Masséna intercepted the Austrians at Cerea with two brigades weakened by straggling. Ott held on until Wurmser arrived with the main body, driving the French back with 1,200 casualties. Bonaparte ordered Sahuguet to take up blocking positions at Castel d'Ario and at Governolo where the Mincio River flowed into the Po River. The next day, the Austrian field marshal, assisted by a local guide, crossed a bridge that Sahuguet failed to destroy and led 10,000 infantry and 3,000 cavalry to Mantua.

After capturing the detachment at Legnago on 13 September, Bonaparte appeared before Mantua. On 15 September, Wurmser awaited the French on the east bank of the Mincio River in line of battle, with his right flank on the San Giorgio suburb and his left on La Favorita Palace. The Austrian left wing under Ott held off Sahuguet's attacks all day. But the Austrian line gave way before the attacks of Masséna on the center and General of Brigade Louis André Bon (leading Augereau's division) on the right. The French succeeded in capturing the San Giorgio suburb and driving the Austrians into Mantua. During this fight, 2,500 Austrians became casualties and 11 cannon and 3 colors were captured. The French lost 1,500 killed and wounded, plus nine guns captured.

== Results ==
Mantua's garrison was swollen to nearly 30,000 men. But, within six weeks, 4,000 Austrians died of wounds or disease in the crowded fortress. One historian notes that

The second attempt to relieve Mantua had therefore come to a rather sorry conclusion for the Austrians. Their army commander had managed to get himself shut inside the very place he was trying to liberate, losing more than 11,000 men in the process. The French had failed to make the link between their armies in Italy and Germany, and Bonaparte was, in a sense, back to square one, still faced with the problem of reducing Mantua, which now had a much more powerful garrison.

== Footnotes ==
| Preceded by Battle of Rovereto | French Revolution: Revolutionary campaigns Battle of Bassano | Succeeded by Battle of Emmendingen |
