= Château des Ducs de La Trémoille =

Château in Thouars, Deux-Sèvres, France

Coordinates: 46.9709°N 0.2173°W

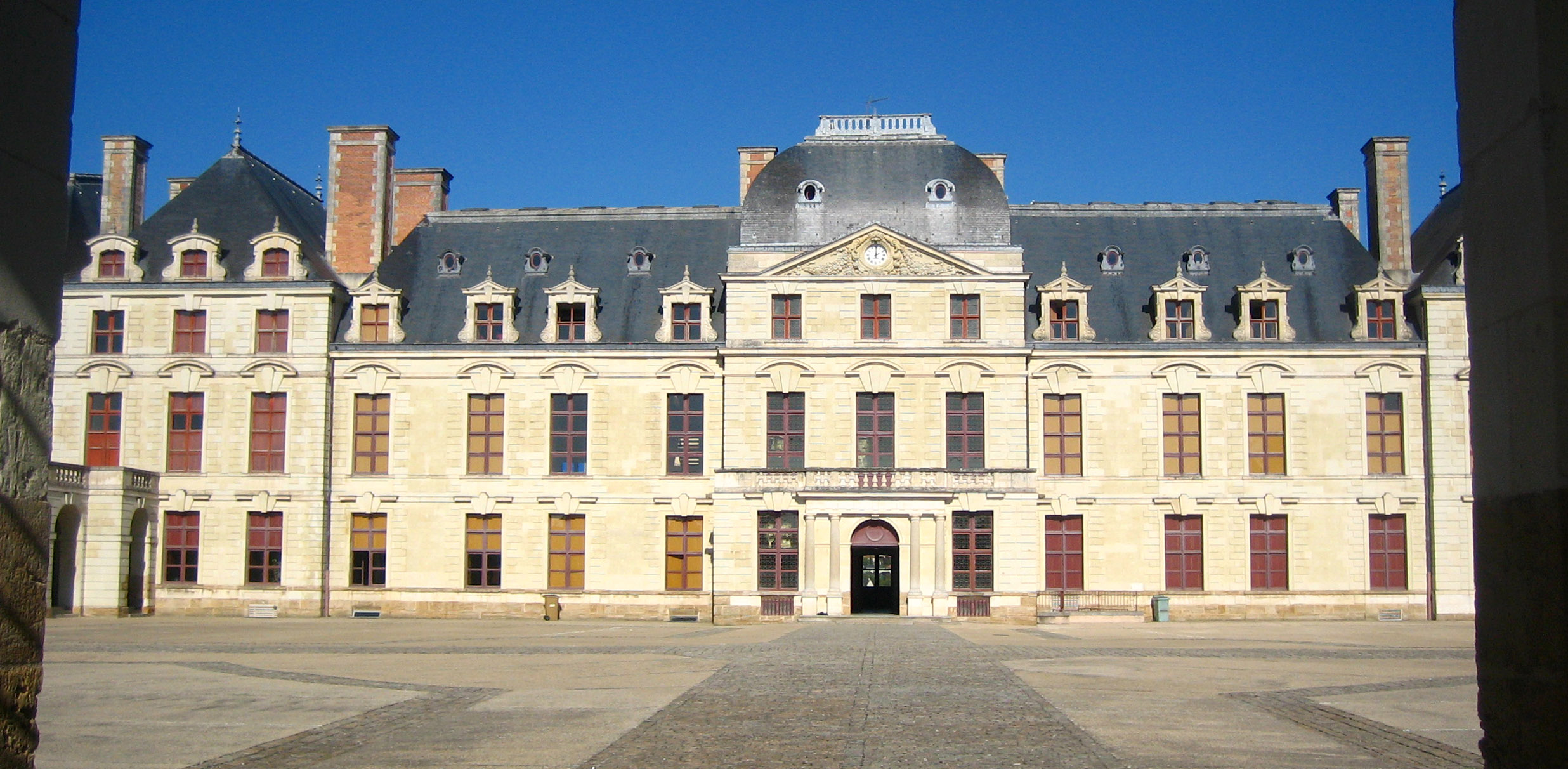
Château des Ducs de la Trémoïlle in Thouars

The Château des Ducs de La Trémoille (English: Castle of the Dukes of La Tremoille) is located in Thouars in the Deux-Sèvres département of France and was built in the 17th century. It is located on a strategic defense point—a promontory above the Thouet river—and consists of the main building, an inner court, an orangery, a chapel and a stable.

== History ==
The first known reference to the city of Thouars is dated 762, in a document describing how a fortress was taken and then razed to the ground by Pepin the Short. Later reconstructed -it is regularly mentioned from the 10th century- the castle was again partially destroyed in 1158 by Henry II of England coveting the lands of Thouars's viscounty which would be an important stronghold during the Hundred Years' War. A surrounding wall itself included in the city wall was added to the dungeon at the end of the 12th century. Unfortunately no pictures of the different castles from this period are available.

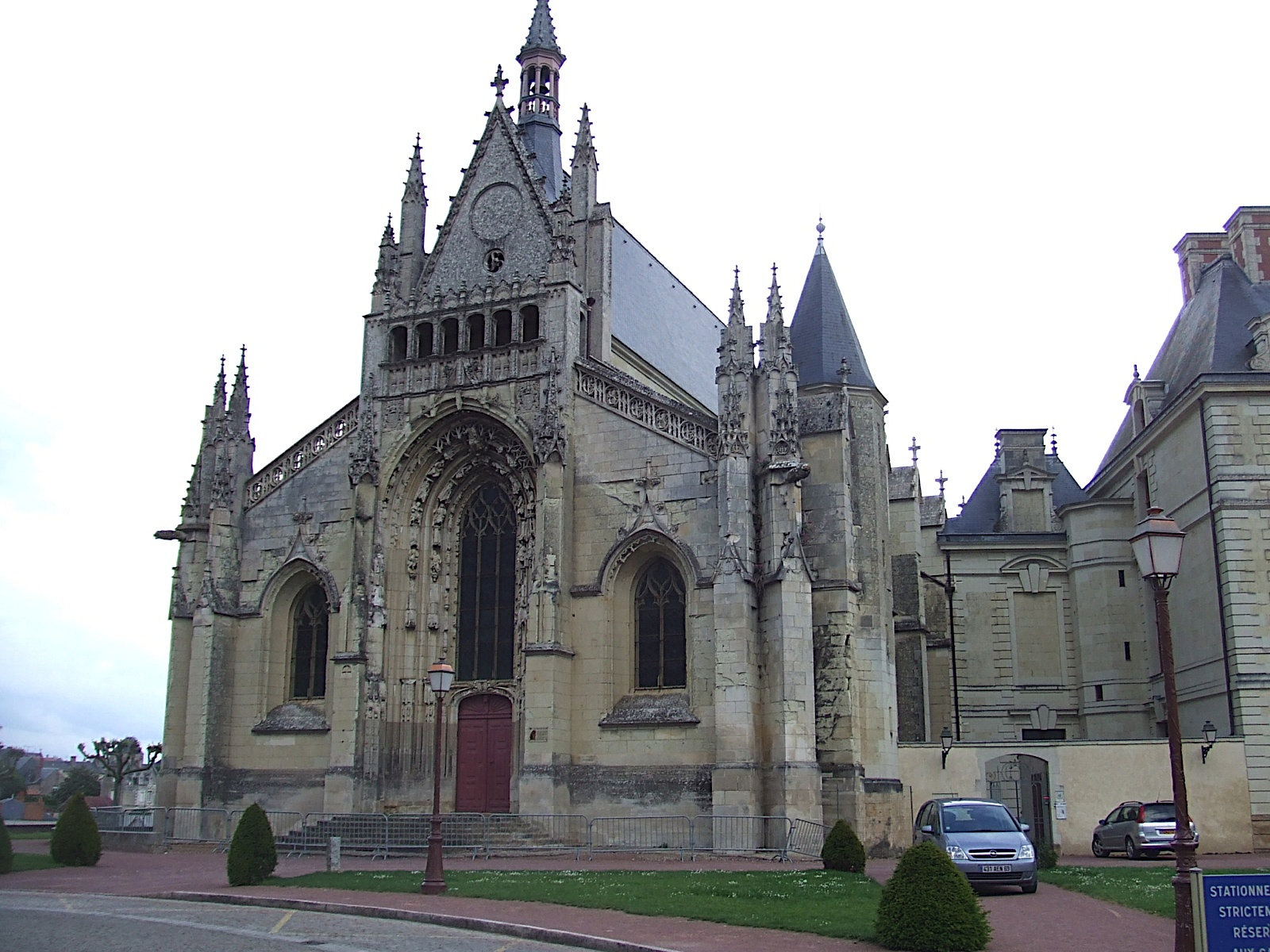
Chapel of Thouars castle

After belonging to the House of Amboise, then being annexed to the royal domain by Louis XI, the viscounty was given to the house of La Trémoille in 1489, that were made dukes later by Charles IX of France. Gabrielle de Bourbon, wife of Louis II de La Trémoille ordered the construction of the chapel built between 1503 and 1509 which is still visible today. The chapel is of flamboyant gothic style for the lower part and influenced by Italian Renaissance for the upper gallery and was designed by several architects including André Amy and Jean Chahureau. It was designated as a collegiate church in 1515 by Pope Leo X and hosted a relic of the crucifixion of Jesus Christ.

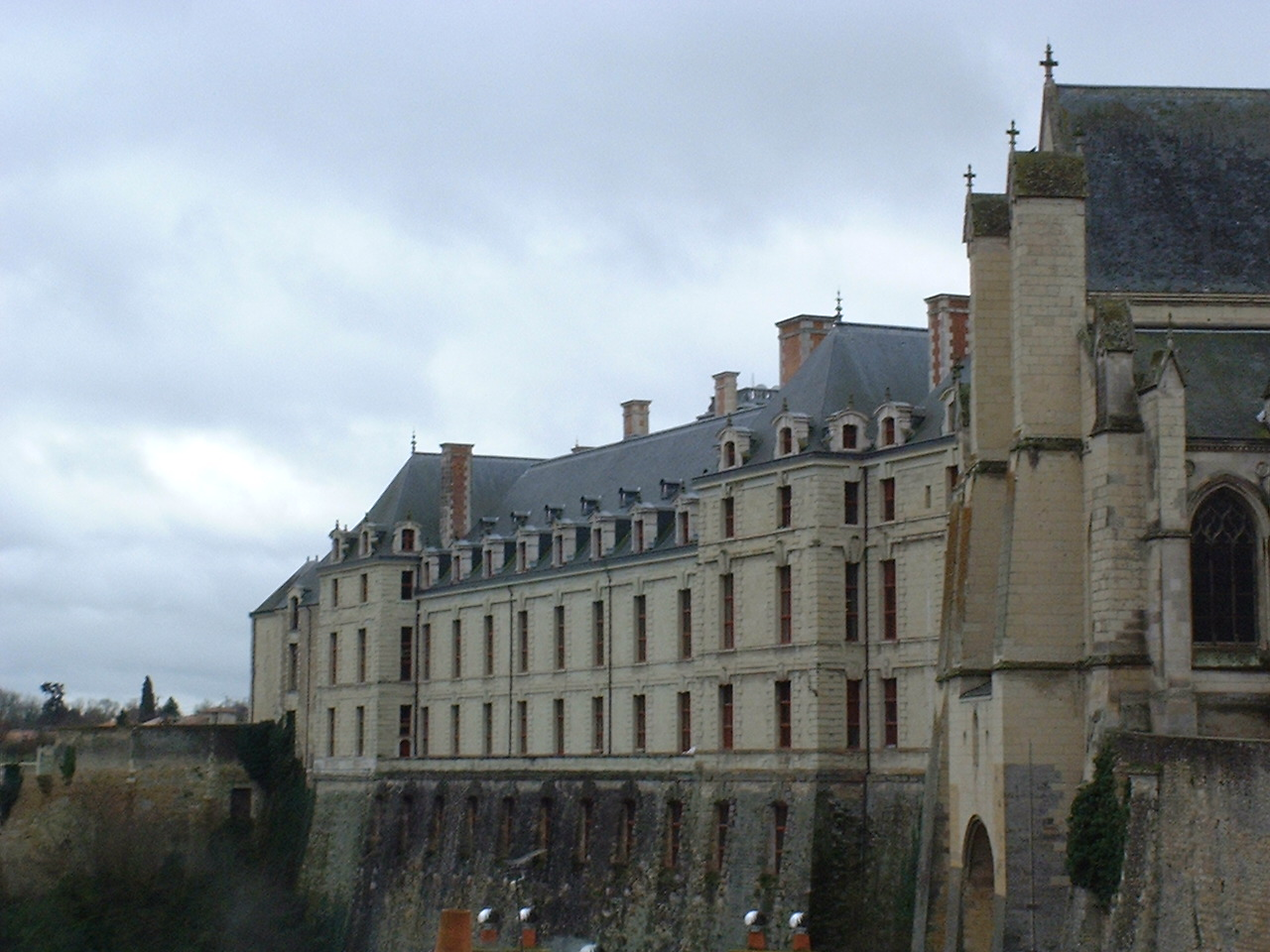
Château des Ducs de la Trémoïlle in Thouars

In 1619, Henri de La Trémoille married Marie de La Tour d'Auvergne. In the year 1628 the duchess and her intendent the sieur d'Iray oversaw the construction of a small pavilion. She then proceeded to order the building of the South pavilion for her apartments in the year 1635 and decided later to build a newer, more luxurious castle in place of the old one. The project was entrusted to Jacques Lemercier, an architect of King Louis XIII and famous for his work on the Château de Richelieu, Versailles, the Louvre, and the Chapel of la Sorbonne in Paris. The construction began in 1638. At the time it was one of the most important castles in France with its 110-meter long façade and its main courtyard (Cour d'honneur) surrounded by 70-metre long galleries. The south side contained the gardens and the orangery, outbuildings and an unfinished stable later complemented the site. Attracted by being at the court of Louis XIV, the members of the House of La Tremoille later neglected the castle in favour of their Parisian residency.

During the French Revolution, the castle and the chapel were plundered and more than 40 paintings and the marble tombs in the chapel were destroyed. The trees from the orangery and the content of the library were burnt to provide warmth for the soldiers. It became national property and then the siege of the sous-préfecture in 1797. It was offered to Vaubois by Napoleon in 1803, then to Masséna in 1809 both refused because of the restoration and maintenance costs. The city of Thouars bought the site from the state in 1833 to use it as a barracks until 1849. It then was used as a private college -College Saint-Louis- by priest until 1869. The chapel was bought back by the family of La Tremoille in 1873. The castle was transformed into a prison and used for this purpose from 1872 to 1925, accommodating up to 1 200 prisoners during World War I. The city of Thouars then decided to make it a public school in the year 1933 and from 1979 to today it is a middle school named Marie de La Tour d'Auvergne. It remained under restoration from 1987.

== The orangery ==
Construction work on the orangery started in the year 1657 under the direction of Jacques Cornesse. Account books attest this from the year 1658 including delivery of material for the construction. The orangery consisted of a rectangular building with a slate roof and was completed in 1659. In 1692 the Duke Charles Belgique Hollande de La Tremoille started an extension of the gardens that was terminated in 1705. It is reported in the 1790 inventory that the orangery was host to 182 tree saplings. The facade of the orangery is 66m long and is surrounded by two staircases. Some hypotheses have been made about links with the royal orangery of Versailles or the orangery of Meudon designed by Louis Le Vau due to style similarities, although none have been confirmed by a written source.

When the castle was used as barracks after 1810, the orangery became a gymnasium for soldiers to train. It was then transformed into a production workshop for the prisoners in 1873, after the city made the castle available to the Ministry of the Interior to use it as a penitentiary. Different trades were developed: a carpenter's workshop in 1873, a cobbler's and a tailor's workshop in 1874, a clog-making one in 1875, a shoemaking and a "nut cracking" one in 1876. Later, in 1886 there was cooperage workshop, then in 1890 a button workshop and a corset one. In 1909 there was a net workshop and in 1912 the cycle workshop of the brand Bim's was created by Mr. Thomas and the last workshop created by Mr. Jourdan produced clogs and galoshes. However, when the prison closed in 1925, almost all workshops closed due to the loss of cheap labour from the inmates. The last ones standing were the ones from Mr. Thomas and Mr. Jourdan which finally closed respectively in 1930 and 1931, and the city did not manage to find someone to take over.

In 1935, the orangery was used to accommodate Spanish refugees. After the beginning of World War 2 the factory of Charles Rusz, which produced for the French Army, moved from Asnières to Thouars in the orangery because it was too exposed to bombing. The factory was requisitioned by Germany in the summer of 1940 and produced landing gears. At this time, some workers took part in a clandestine organization, the OS-680, which aimed to mobilize public opinion, collect weapons, construct explosive devices, and sabotage factory production. After the liberation, the factory returned to normal activity until August 1945. Then it was sold to Georges Renollaud and the DOP (dispositif oléo pneumatique) to produce aviation equipment for the French Air Force, the French Navy, and aeronautic companies like Sud-Aviation until it filed for bankruptcy in March 1968. The workshop was deconstructed between 1970 and 1980 and since then it hosts events for different associations of Thouars. It is part of the restoration plan of the castle, which began in 1990.
