= Courcelles-sur-Vesle =

- Commune
- Location of Courcelles-sur-Vesle
- Location within France Location within Hauts-de-France
- Coordinates: 49°20′20″N 3°34′22″E
- Country: France
- Region: Hauts-de-France
- Department: Aisne
- Arrondissement: Soissons
- Canton: Fère-en-Tardenois

Government
  - Mayor (2026–32): Luc Tordeux
- Area^{1}: 8.81 km^{2} (3.40 sq mi)
- Elevation: 75 m (246 ft)
- Highest elevation: 176 m (577 ft)
- Lowest elevation: 52 m (171 ft)
- Population (2023): 352
  - Density: 40.0/km^{2} (103/sq mi)
- Time zone: UTC+01:00 (CET)
  - Summer (DST): UTC+02:00 (CEST)
- INSEE/Postal code: 02224 /02220
- ^{1} French Land Register data, which excludes lakes, ponds, glaciers > 1 km^{2} (0.386 sq mi or 247 acres) and river estuaries.

Courcelles-sur-Vesle (French pronunciation: [kuʁsɛl syʁ vɛl], literally Courcelles on Vesle) is a commune in the Aisne department in Hauts-de-France in northern France.

== Population ==
Historical population
Year	Pop.	±% p.a.
1968	260	—
1975	227	−1.92%
1982	222	−0.32%
1990	270	+2.48%
1999	295	+0.99%
2007	324	+1.18%
2012	365	+2.41%
2017	350	−0.84%
2023	352	+0.10%
Source: INSEE

== See also ==
- Communes of the Aisne department
