= Siege of Mantua (1796–1797) =

1796–1797 siege during the War of the First Coalition

- Part of the Italian campaign of 1796–1797 in the War of the First Coalition
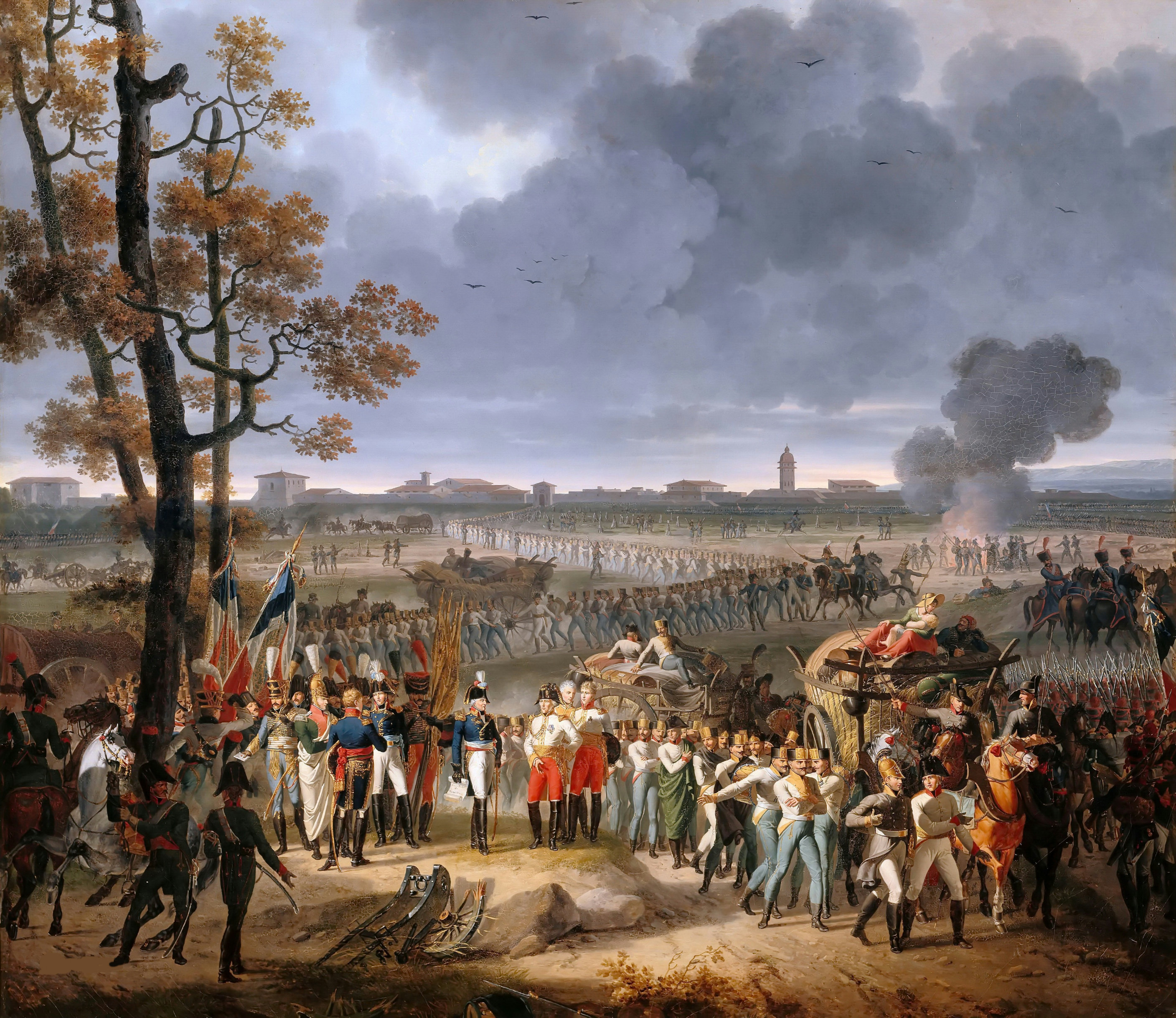
- Surrender of Mantua, February 2, 1797: General Wurmser surrenders to General Sérurier; Hippolyte Lecomte, 1812
Date	4 June – 1 August 1796; 27 August 1796 – 2 February 1797 (7 months, 4 weeks and 1 day)
Location	Mantua, Italy 45.1600°N 10.8000°E
Result	French victory

Belligerents
France	Austria

Commanders and leaders
Napoleon Bonaparte; Charles-Pierre Augereau; Claude Dallemagne; Thomas-Alexandre Dumas; Pascal Antoine Fiorella; Jean Joseph Guieu; Jean Lannes; André Masséna; Jean-Mathieu-Philibert Sérurier	Dagobert von Wurmser; Peter Karl Ott von Bátorkéz; Prince Friedrich Franz Xaver of Hohenzollern-Hechingen; Giovanni Marchese di Provera; Joseph Canto d'Irles; Josef Philipp Vukassovich

Strength
16,000	25,000–34,000

Casualties and losses
7,000 killed, wounded or captured 179 guns lost	16,333 killed, wounded or died of disease 16,000 captured 325 guns captured
- Location within Europe

War of the First Coalition:
Italian Campaign
current battle
Napoleon as subordinate
Napoleon in command

The siege of Mantua lasted from 4 June 1796 to 2 February 1797 with a short break where French forces under the overall command of Napoleon Bonaparte besieged and blockaded a large Austrian garrison at Mantua for many months until it surrendered. The siege was the focal point of the Italian Campaign of 1796-1797, lasting the vast majority of the campaign and being the hinge point that would determine which side would control Northern Italy. The eventual surrender, together with the heavy losses incurred during four unsuccessful relief attempts, led to Napoleon invading Austria and convincing the Austrians to sue for peace in 1797. The siege occurred during the War of the First Coalition, which is part of the French Revolutionary Wars. Mantua, a city in the Lombardy region of Italy, lies on the Mincio River.

After driving the Austrian army out of northwest and north-central Italy, the French invested the fortress of Mantua starting in early June 1796. In late July, a new Austrian commander, Dagobert Sigmund von Wurmser, led an army to the relief of Joseph Canto d'Irles's garrison from the north. Mantua was reached and the French were forced to abandon the siege. However, the Austrians were subsequently beaten in the battles of Lonato and Castiglione. Forced to retreat, Wurmser resupplied and reinforced the fortress with food and able-bodied troops. After withdrawing north up the Adige River, Wurmser planned to move his main army through the mountains to Bassano via the Brenta valley. From there he would mount the second relief of Mantua from the northeast. In an exceedingly bold maneuver, Bonaparte smashed Paul Davidovich's covering force and followed Wurmser down the Brenta valley. Overcoming the Austrian army at Bassano in early September, Bonaparte tried to destroy Wurmser but failed. Instead he chased the bulk of the Austrian army into Mantua. The garrison now counted 30,000 men, but cut off from outside help, disease and starvation began mowing down Wurmser's troops.

A new commander, József Alvinczi, led the third relief of Mantua in November. While Alvinczi marched from the northeast, Davidovich's column moved down from the north. Alvinczi defeated Bonaparte twice and moved to the gates of Verona while Davidovich drubbed his French opponent in the Adige valley. At his last gasp, Bonaparte crossed the Adige behind Alvinczi's left flank at Arcole. The fighting raged for three days but the French finally prevailed, forcing the Austrians to pull back. Free of Alvinczi, Bonaparte attacked Davidovich and forced his corps to retreat also. For the fourth relief of Mantua, Alvinczi advanced his main army from the north while sending two smaller columns to threaten the French from the northeast. The French crushed the Austrian main army at Rivoli. Leaving two divisions to finish off Alvinczi, Bonaparte rapidly moved south and arrived near Mantua in time to destroy one of the other Austrian columns. With no hope of further help, Wurmser surrendered Mantua in early February.

== Background ==
=== Geography ===
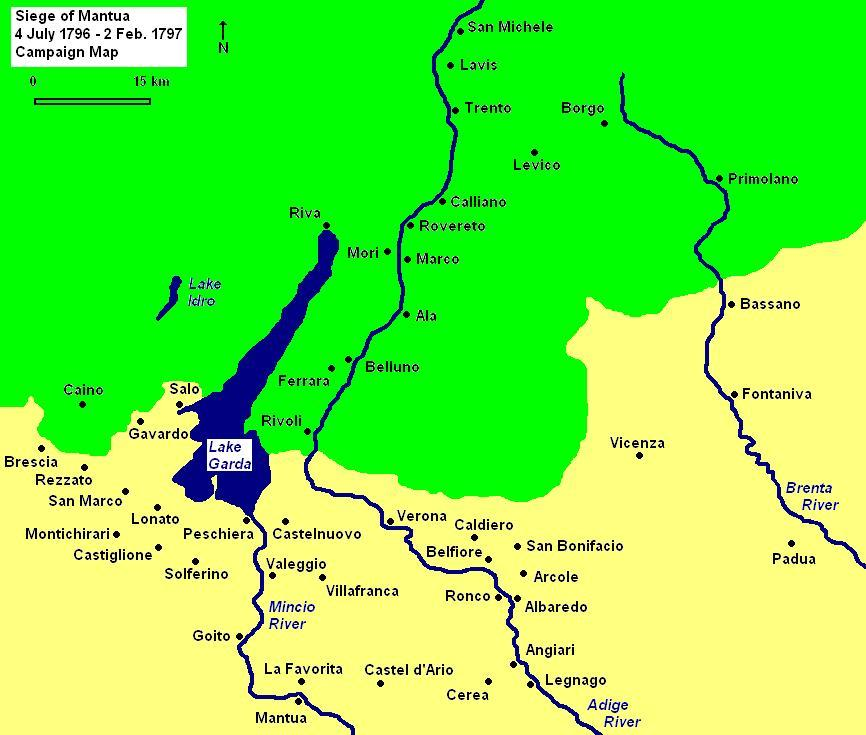
Siege of Mantua campaign map

After being defeated by General of Division Bonaparte's French army at the Battle of Borghetto, the Austrian army led by Feldzeugmeister Johann Beaulieu abandoned the line of the Mincio River, left a strong garrison in the fortress of Mantua, and retreated north to Trento. On 31 May, the French tried to rush the fortress but the attempt failed. The French invested the place on 3 June.

Together with Legnago, Verona, and Peschiera, Mantua forms part of the famous Quadrilateral of fortresses. To this day, the city is bounded on its north and east sides by a large lake formed by the Mincio River. In 1796, Mantua was nearly surrounded by water and connected by causeways to the fortified suburbs of Cittadella to the north and San Giorgio to the east. In the 18th century, the city was notoriously unhealthy in the warm months. The nearby marshes and lakes were an ideal breeding ground for malaria-carrying mosquitoes, though no one understood this at the time.

Mantua lies in the Po River basin. The Po lies 13 km to the south of the city and Peschiera on Lake Garda is 32 km north. Running due east, a major road connected with Padua via Legnago. Another highway went northeast to Verona and Vicenza. Both roads linked with the Austrian frontier. A number of north-to-south running rivers provide defensible positions on the north side of the Po. The most important river is the Adige which rises in the Alps and runs south on the east side of Lake Garda, going past Verona and Legnago.

From Trento in the north, Austrian armies had secure communications with Innsbruck across the Brenner Pass. An Austrian army at Trento had three ways to reach the Po valley in 1796. The first route used the roads running parallel with the Adige on the east side of Lake Garda. The second route went west of Lake Garda via Riva and Lake Idro to either Brescia or Lonato del Garda. The third route lay to the east through Levico Terme and Borgo Valsugana, then south along the Brenta River valley to Bassano del Grappa. By holding both Trento and Bassano, an Austrian army could move troops and supplies through the mountains without the French being able to interfere.

== Siege and blockade ==
=== First relief ===
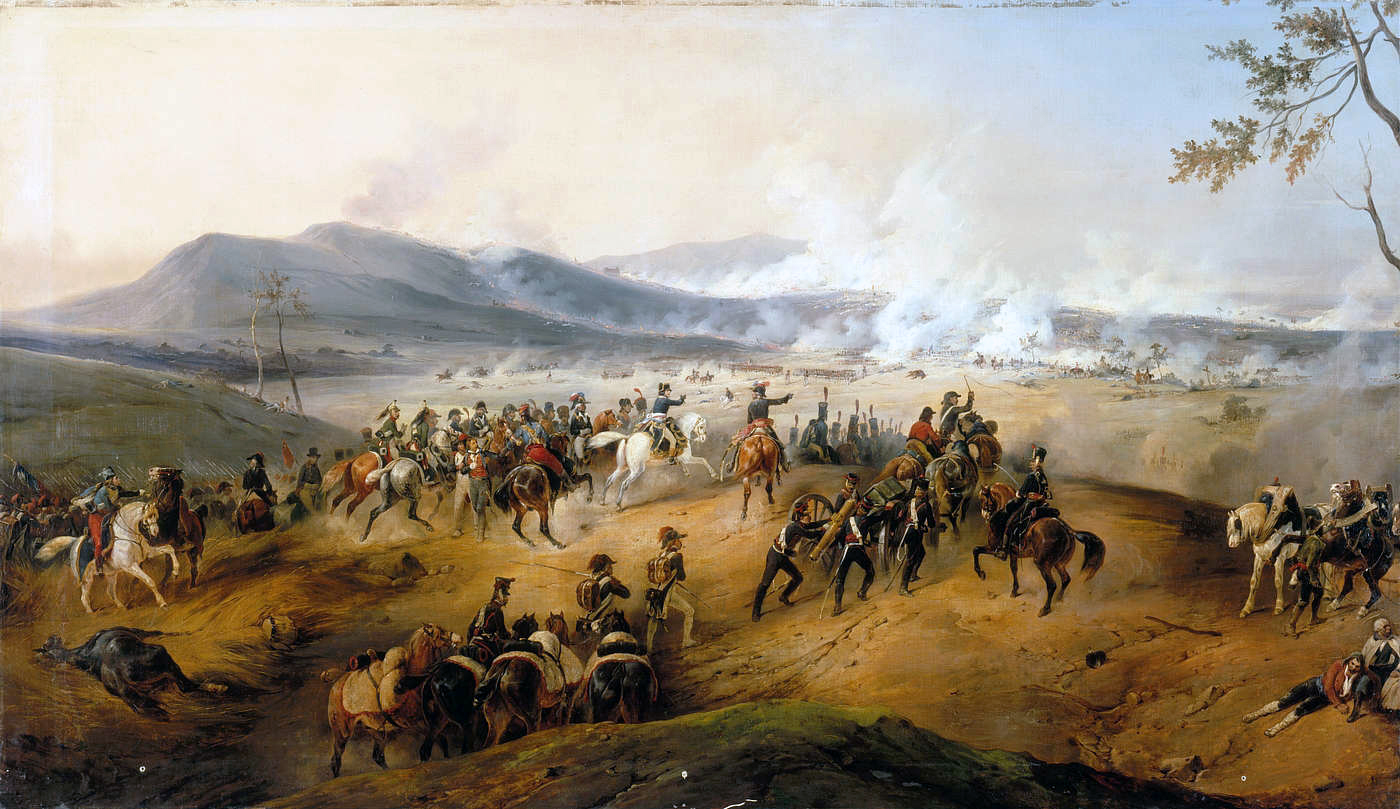
Battle of Castiglione, 5 August 1796

The Castiglione 1796 campaign order of battle shows French and Austrian units and organizations during the first relief of Mantua.

By requisitioning cannon from all over northern Italy, Bonaparte assembled a siege train of 179 heavy guns. Siege parallels were opened on 4 June and General of Division Jean-Mathieu-Philibert Sérurier put in command of operations. Feldmarschall-Leutnant Canto d'Irles commanded the 14,000-man Austrian garrison. Meanwhile, the Austrians replaced Beaulieu with Feldmarschall Wurmser as army commander in Italy.

Wurmser launched the first relief of Mantua at the end of July as a three-pronged attack by 49,000 men. Feldmarschall-Leutnant Peter Vitus von Quosdanovich led a column of 18,000 soldiers to the west of Lake Garda. Wurmser commanded 24,000 men of the two center columns which moved down the Adige River east of Lake Garda. Feldmarschall-Leutnant Johann Mészáros von Szoboszló and 5,000 troops hovered to the east near Vicenza. Bonaparte, who had only 44,000 soldiers, posted his divisions in an arc to protect his siege of Mantua. General of Division André Masséna's 15,000 men held Rivoli Veronese on the upper Adige, General of Division Pierre Augereau with 5,000 troops held Legnago, Sérurier's 10,000 soldiers besieged Mantua, General of Division Pierre François Sauret's 4,500 men defended the west side of Lake Garda, General of Division Hyacinthe François Joseph Despinoy's 5,500 covered Peschiera, and 4,000 others were in reserve or on the march.

Wurmser pushed Masséna back and Quosdanovich quickly seized Brescia, forcing Bonaparte to lift the siege on 1 August. The siege cannon being too heavy to move quickly, the French burned the gun carriages and withdrew. The garrison retrieved the abandoned gun tubes and dragged them into the city. Up to this point, the French besiegers suffered 1,200 killed and wounded, plus 898 captured. The defenders lost 492 killed or died of disease, 395 wounded, and 87 captured or deserted. There were also 3,275 soldiers on the sick list.

After a complex series of actions, Quosdanovich's column came to grief at the Battle of Lonato on 3 August and retreated. Bonaparte then turned on Wurmser and defeated him at the Battle of Castiglione on 5 August. Before retreating up the Adige valley, Wurmser threw two brigades into the fortress and evacuated some of the sick. Because of the loss of his heavy cannons, Bonaparte could no longer try to reduce Mantua by breaching its walls. Instead, he was forced to blockade the city.

=== Second relief ===
The Bassano 1796 campaign order of battle shows French and Austrian units and organizations during the second relief of Mantua.

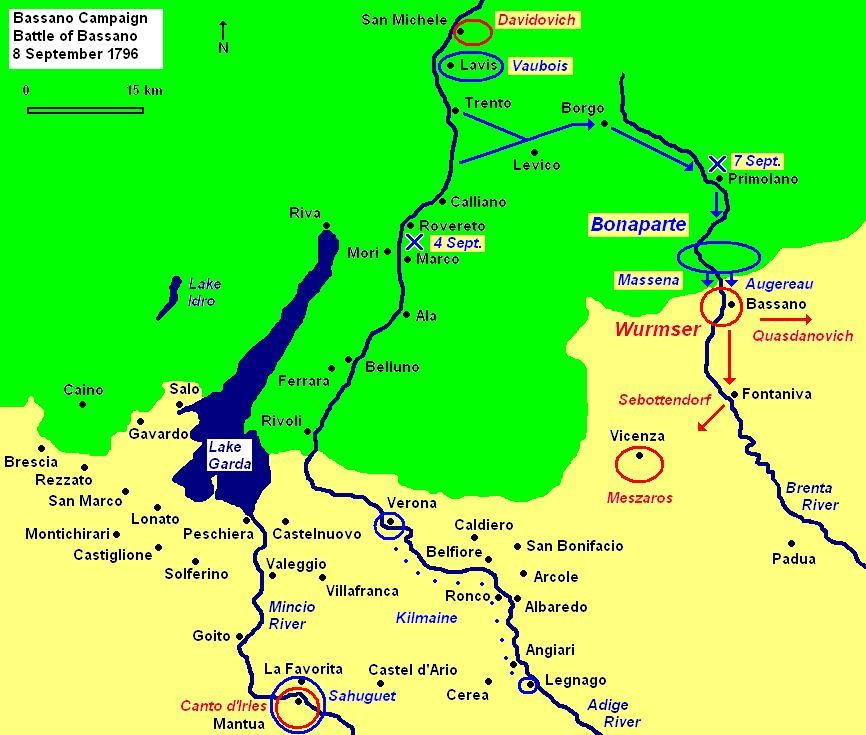
Battle of Bassano, 8 September 1796

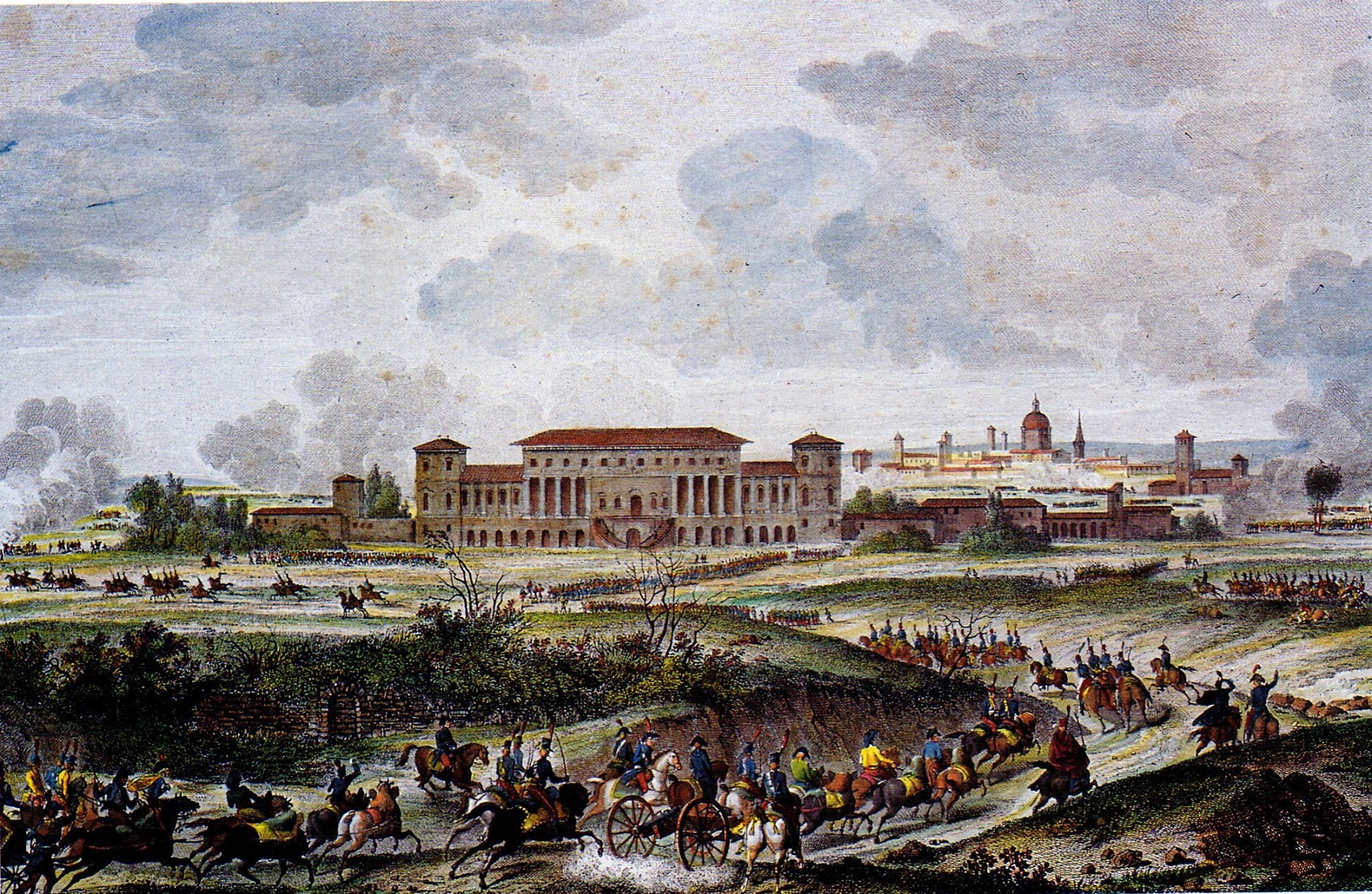
La Favorita Palace was the scene of several actions

At the beginning of September, 14,000 Austrians under Feldmarschall-Leutnant Paul Davidovich held the upper Adige valley to the north. With the rest of the army, Wurmser marched down the Brenta valley to the vicinity of Bassano. The Austrian plan was for both corps to probe cautiously forward. If an opportunity arose, they were to march to Mantua's relief. Wurmser's chief-of-staff, Feldmarschall-Leutnant Franz von Lauer believed that the French were incapable of quickly reacting to an Austrian offensive. This proved to be a serious miscalculation. Bonaparte sent General of Division Claude-Henri Belgrand de Vaubois and 10,000 men north on the west side of Lake Garda. Masséna with 13,000 and Augereau with 10,000 men advanced north up the Adige valley. General of Division Charles Edward Jennings de Kilmaine blockaded Mantua with 8,000 in General of Division Jean Sahuguet's division and a 2,000-man reserve.

Bonaparte's concentration of three divisions overwhelmed Davidovich at the Battle of Rovereto on 4 September. Leaving Vaubois in Trento to watch the remnants of Davidovich's corps, Bonaparte boldly decided to cut loose from his supply line and follow in Wurmser's wake. He directed Masséna and Augereau east through Levico and Borgo, then south down the Brenta valley. Augereau dispersed the Austrian rearguard at Primolano on 7 September. The two French divisions fell upon Wurmser and beat him badly at the Battle of Bassano on 8 September. Instead of retreating to the east, Wurmser joined the division of Mészáros and headed west for Mantua with Bonaparte in hot pursuit. Hoping to annihilate his adversary before he reached Mantua, the French commander sent Augereau to Padua to prevent Wurmser from escaping to the east and Masséna through Vicenza and Arcole.

Masséna intercepted General-major Peter Karl Ott von Bátorkéz's vanguard at Cerea on 11 September, but the Austrian gamely held on until Wurmser's main force came up to deal the French a bloody repulse. Aided by a local guide, Wurmser slipped past Sahuguet's blocking force to reach the fortress the next day. The 1,600-man Austrian rearguard surrendered to Augereau at Legnago on 13 September.

Wurmser arrived at the fortress with 10,367 infantry and 2,856 cavalry, temporarily disrupting the siege on the eastern side of the city. On 15 September, the Austrian field marshal stood to fight a pitched battle on the east side of the Mincio, with his left flank at La Favorita Palace and his right in front of the San Giorgio suburb. Bonaparte sent Sahuguet to attack La Favorita and Augereau's division (temporarily led by General of Brigade Louis André Bon) to assault Wurmser's right. Masséna advanced in the center. Ott fought off Sahuguet all day, but the Austrian right and center crumbled. The Austrians withdrew into Cittadella and the French captured San Giorgio. Austrian losses numbered 2,452 men and 11 guns, while the French lost 1,500 and nine guns.

At this time, there were nearly 30,000 Austrians crowded into Mantua. Within six weeks, 4,000 died from wounds or sickness. During the next two weeks Wurmser organized foraging expeditions to the south of the city which gathered some supplies for the beleaguered garrison. On 23 September, a sortie by Ott and General-major Ferdinand Minckwitz suffered a stinging defeat at Governolo with 1,000 casualties. By 29 September, Kilmaine closely reinvested the fortress.

=== Third relief ===
The Arcola 1796 Campaign Order of Battle shows French and Austrian units and organizations during the third relief of Mantua.

Feldzeugmeister József Alvinczi began the third relief attempt in early November. Alvinczi and Quosdanovich led the 28,000 troops of the Friaul Corps from the Piave River toward the west. Meanwhile, Davidovich's Tyrol Corps was reinforced to 19,000 men. Bonaparte planned to hold the Austrians by deploying Vaubois with 10,500 men near Trento and Masséna with 9,500 at Bassano. Augereau lay at Verona with 8,500, Kilmaine blockaded Mantua with about 10,000 men, and there were 5,000 more in reserve units.

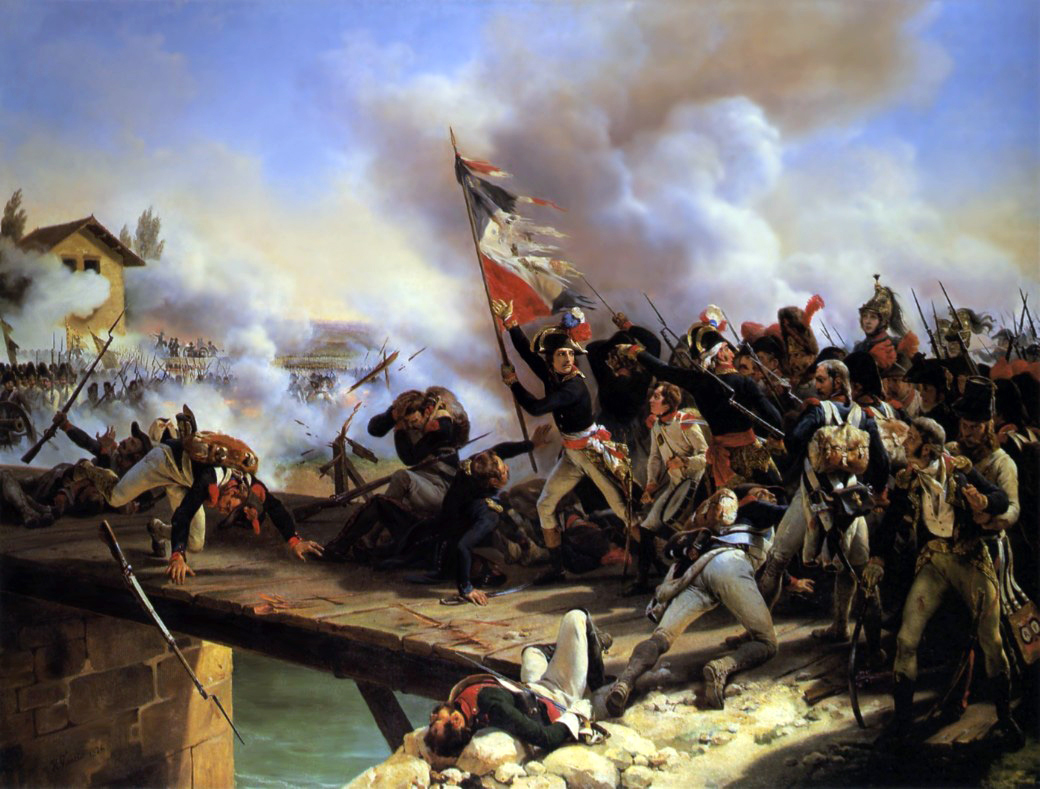
The Crossing of the Arcole Bridge by Horace Vernet, 1826. Battle of Arcole, showing Bonaparte leading his troops across the bridge

After a clash at Cembra on 2 November, Davidovich pressed the outnumbered Vaubois back and captured Trento. At the Battle of Calliano the Tyrol Corps routed Vaubois on 7 November. Meanwhile, Bonaparte brought forward Augereau and Francois Macquard to attack Alvinczi at the Second Battle of Bassano on 6 November with 19,500 troops. In a bitter fight, the French were defeated. Bonaparte pulled the divisions of Augereau and Masséna back to Verona. He then sent Masséna to stabilize the situation in the Adige valley. Believing incorrectly that Masséna's division was present, Davidovich slowed his advance to a crawl. Issuing out of Verona, Bonaparte attacked the Austrians at the Battle of Caldiero on 12 November and was repulsed again.

At this point, the French commander almost decided to retreat to the Adda River. But Bonaparte soon realized that the Austrian generals were being slow to take advantage of their opportunities. He determined to attack the Austrians again, leaving Macquard and 3,000 men to hold Verona in Alvinczi's front. Taking every spare soldier from Vaubois and Kilmaine, Bonaparte sent Masséna and Augereau to cross the Adige south of the Austrian positions and turn the enemy left flank. In the Battle of Arcole which lasted from 15 to 17 November, Bonaparte defeated Alvinczi and caused him to withdraw to the east. Also on the 17th, Davidovich smashed Vaubois at Rivoli. Having temporarily disposed of Alvinczi, Bonaparte turned on the Tyrol Corps and sent it fleeing northward. While this was going on, Alvinczi reoccupied his former position at Caldiero and Arcole. But when he heard that Davidovich was no longer in the field, he withdrew the Friaul Corps to Bassano. With a horrible sense of timing, Wurmser tried to break out of Mantua on 23 November. The Austrians lost 789 men and captured 200 Frenchmen. When his prisoners informed him that Davidovich's corps was routed, Wurmser pulled back into the fortress. One source noted that the Arcole campaign cost the Austrians 17,832 casualties while estimating French losses at 19,500.

=== Fourth relief ===
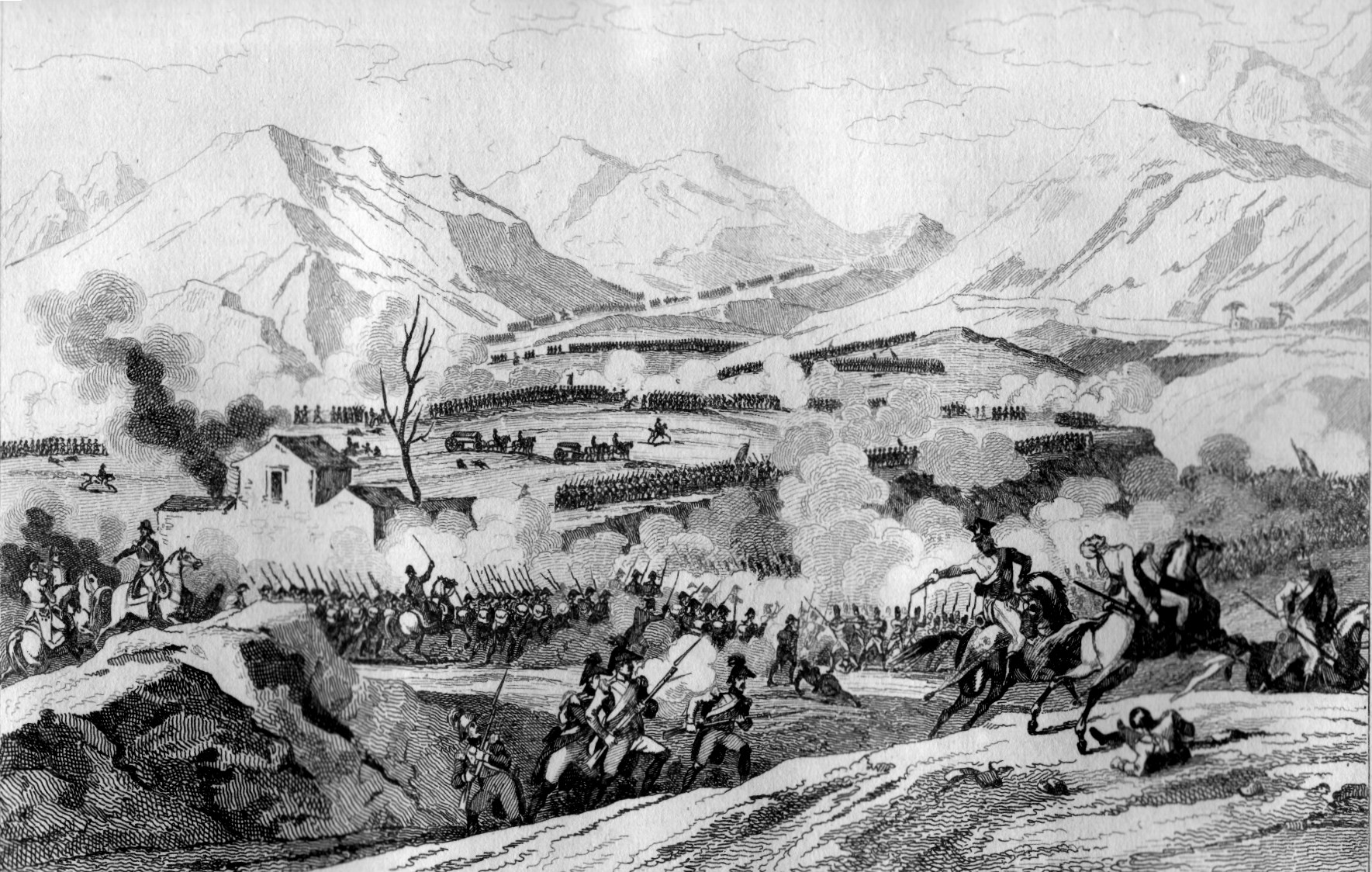
Battle of Rivoli, showing the French driving Prince Reuss' troops into the Pontare

The Rivoli 1797 Campaign Order of Battle shows French and Austrian units and organizations during the fourth relief of Mantua.

Alvinczi massed his main body of 28,000 men in the north for the fourth attempt to relieve Mantua. The Austrian commander sent Feldmarschall-Leutnant Adam Bajalics von Bajahaza with 6,200 men to move southeast from Bassano and demonstrate in front of Verona. Alvinczi ordered Feldmarschall-Leutnant Giovanni Marchese di Provera with 9,000 soldiers and a bridging train to advance from Padua, cross the Adige near Legnago, and relieve Mantua.

To defend against these forces, Bonaparte deployed Brevet General of Division Barthélemy Catherine Joubert's 10,300-man division near Rivoli in the upper Adige valley, Masséna's 9,000 men at Verona, Augereau's 9,000 troops behind the Adige near Legnago, General of Division Gabriel Venance Rey's 4,000 soldiers west of Lake Garda, and Sérurier's 10,000 blockading Mantua. A 2,000-man infantry brigade under General of Brigade Claude Perrin Victor and three small cavalry brigades remained in reserve.

On 7 January, Provera began to move and Bajalics started his advance the next day. By 10 January, Provera and Bajalics were menacing Legnago and Verona, while Alvinczi's army started its march from the north. On the afternoon of 13 January, Bonaparte realized the main Austrian attack was coming from the north. Accordingly, he ordered Masséna, Rey, and Victor to march to Joubert's aid. That night, Provera crossed the Adige above Legnago at Angiari and marched for Mantua, leaving 2,000 men as a bridge guard.

On 14 January, Bonaparte inflicted a severe drubbing on Alvinczi's army at the Battle of Rivoli. Leaving Joubert, Rey, and Victor to finish off Alvinczi's crippled army, the French commander ordered Masséna south the next day. Meanwhile, Augereau captured Provera's bridge guard and moved west. Provera's advance guard failed to break through Sérurier's blockade and a breakout attempt by Wurmser was repelled at dawn on 16 January. That day, surrounded by Masséna, Augereau, and Sérurier, and unable to get through to Mantua, Provera surrendered at La Favorita with 6,000 men. By this time, Alvinczi's main body lost 4,000 killed and wounded, plus a staggering 8,000 soldiers captured. The French suffered 3,200 casualties at Rivoli.

=== Capitulation ===
After the Rivoli disaster, Wurmser held out two more weeks before capitulating on 2 February. During the siege and blockade, the Austrians reported 16,333 killed and wounded in action or died of disease. In recognition of his stout defense, the old field marshal was freed with his staff and an escort of 700 soldiers and 6 cannon. The rest of the garrison marched out with the honors of war and were paroled on the condition not to fight against France until exchanged. Only 16,000 Austrians were fit enough to march out under their own power. Historian David G. Chandler reports that as many as 18,000 Austrians and 7,000 French died during the siege. His health ruined, Canto d'Irles died shortly afterward. The fortress, with 325 cannon, passed into French control. Bonaparte also recovered the 179 guns lost in August 1796. While the Austrians desperately scraped together another army, Bonaparte consolidated his position in northern Italy by crushing the army of the Papal States at the Battle of Faenza. In March he launched a final offensive against Vienna.

== Commentary ==
It did not help their cause that the Austrian generals faced a military genius in Bonaparte. But they also pursued a flawed strategy. Chandler wrote,

"Throughout the whole year, the lure of Mantua continued to exert a fatal attraction over the Austrian field forces and led them to one costly failure after another."

Chandler added,

"In each of the four attempts to relieve Mantua, the Austrian high command divided their forces into unconnected parts routed along divergent lines of advance, which made coordinated effort impossible, hoping thereby to divert Bonaparte's attention and cause the fragmentation of his forces. In the event, however, they only laid their own forces open to defeat in detail, throwing away the chance of commanding a decisive numerical superiority on the critical battlefield, thus violating the principle of true economy of force."

== Battles during the siege ==
- Battle of Lonato, 3–4 August 1796
- Battle of Castiglione, 5 August 1796
- Battle of Rovereto, 4 September 1796
- Battle of Bassano, 8 September 1796
- Second Battle of Bassano, 6 November 1796
- Battle of Calliano, 6–7 November 1796
- Battle of Caldiero (1796), 12 November 1796
- Battle of Arcole, 15–17 November 1796
- Battle of Rivoli, 14–15 January 1797
