= Johann Mészáros von Szoboszló =

Habsburg general (1737–1801)

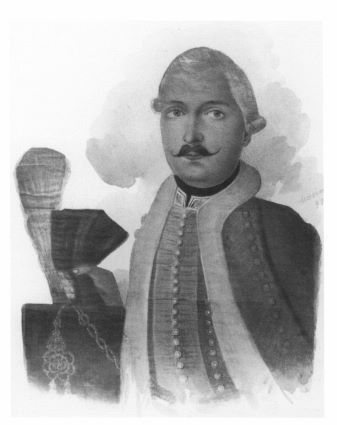
- Johann Mészáros von Szoboszló
- Born: 1737; Kunhegyes, Hungary
- Died: 17 November 1801 (aged 63–64); Csomaköz, Hungary
- Military career
- Allegiance: Habsburg monarchy
- Branch: Cavalry
- Rank: Feldmarschall-Leutnant
- Conflicts: Seven Years' War; War of the Bavarian Succession; Austro-Turkish War (1788–1791); Battle of Focsani; French Revolutionary Wars; First Battle of Wissembourg; Action of Rastatt; Battle of Ettlingen; Battle of Castiglione; Siege of Mantua
- Awards: Military Order of Maria Theresa, KC (1793); Military Order of Maria Theresa, CC (1796)

Johann Mészáros von Szoboszló (1737 – 17 November 1801) joined the Habsburg army in 1756 and fought the Prussians, Ottoman Turks, and French during a long military career. During the French Revolutionary Wars, he fought in several campaigns. He commanded a division in the Italian campaign of 1796–1797 against the army of Napoleon Bonaparte. He was Proprietor (Inhaber) of an Austrian Uhlan regiment from 1792 to 1797 and a Hussar regiment from 1797 to 1801.

== Early career ==
A Hungarian, Mészáros was born in Kunhegyes in 1737. He entered the Habsburg military service in 1756 as a Cornet in the Desewffy Hussar Regiment # 30. He fought in the Seven Years' War and became a Major on 10 January 1774. He was promoted to Oberst-Leutnant on 1 November 1778 during the War of the Bavarian Succession. On 1 May 1784, he was appointed Oberst (Colonel) of the Kaiser Joseph II Hussar Regiment # 2. During the Austro-Turkish War (1788–1791), he was promoted General-Major as a reward for leading a successful cavalry charge at the Battle of Focsani and other exploits.

== French Revolutionary War ==
=== Rhine 1792–1796 ===
In 1792, he became proprietor of the Mészáros Uhlan Regiment (this became # 1 in 1798) and held this dignity until 1797. The mounted lancer unit was formed by combining two uhlan squadrons each from the Kaiser, Karaczay, Levenehr, and Lobkowitz Chevauxleger Regiments. On 13 October 1793, he led the 4th column under Dagobert von Wurmser in the First Battle of Wissembourg. He was awarded the Knight's Cross of the Military Order of Maria Theresa on 25 October 1793 for his distinguished service. In 1794, he served in Friedrich Freiherr von Hotze's corps. Promotion to Feldmarschall-Leutnant came on 4 March 1796 after more service with the Army of the Upper Rhine under Wurmser and Maximilian Baillet de Latour. He received the Commander's Cross of the Military Order of Maria Theresa on 11 May. On 5 July 1796, Mészáros and Karl Aloys zu Fürstenberg led the Austrian rear guard in action at Rastatt.

=== Italy 1796–1797 ===
Immediately after Ettlingen, Mészáros went to Italy, where Wurmser had replaced Johann Beaulieu as commander-in-chief. During the first relief of the Siege of Mantua, the army commander assigned Mészáros to lead IV Column. This force moved down the Brenta River valley to Bassano del Grappa at the end of July. From there, he approached Mantua from the northeast via Vicenza. Unfortunately, this left the IV Column remote from the action during a critical phase of operations. When Mészáros' troops finally arrived near Mantua, Wurmser ordered him to observe the French division that had just raised the siege of that fortress. But Pascal Fiorella's division got off to an early start on 5 August and Mészáros was unable to intercept it. Fiorella's attack against the left rear of the Habsburg army helped Bonaparte win the Battle of Castiglione.

At the beginning of the second relief of Mantua, Mészáros lay west of Bassano with a division of 10,673 soldiers. Unexpectedly, Bonaparte defeated Austrian forces at the Battle of Rovereto in the Tyrol. Then the main French army moved east and south down the Brenta valley to defeat Wurmser at the Battle of Bassano on 8 September. Instead of retreating to the east, Wurmser moved southwest to unite with Mészáros and marched hard for Mantua. The Austrians evaded Bonaparte's pursuit and reached the fortress, though the French forced them to fight a costly battle at La Favorita Palace on 15 September. After this, Mészáros and his soldiers suffered through the long Siege of Mantua before Wurmser surrendered to Bonaparte on 2 February 1797.

== Later career ==
In 1797, he became proprietor of Mészáros Hussar Regiment # 35 (it was renumbered # 10 in 1798) and commander of the Hungarian Insurrections, a national militia. Soon after Mantua, he retired from active military service. He died in 1801 at Csomaköz in Hungary.

== Footnotes ==
Military offices
Preceded by New regiment	Proprietor (Inhaber) of Uhlan Regiment # 1; 1792–1797	Succeeded by Maximilian, Count of Merveldt
Preceded by Vincenz von Barco	Proprietor (Inhaber) of Hussar Regiment # 10; Pre-1798: Hussar Regiment # 35; 1797–1801	Succeeded by Joseph von Stipsics zu Ternowa
