= Karl Philipp Sebottendorf =

Austrian general (1740–1818)

Karl Philipp Sebottendorf van der Rose (17 July 1740 – 11 April 1818) enrolled in the Austrian army at the age of 18, became a general officer during the French Revolutionary Wars, and commanded a division against Napoleon Bonaparte in several notable battles during the Italian campaign of 1796.

== Early career ==
Sebottendorf was born in Luxembourg in the Austrian Netherlands on 17 July 1740 of parents Oberst (Colonel) Johann Moritz Sebottendorf van der Rose (d. 1760) and Maria Anna Bodek von Ellgau (d. 1791). After military studies at the Wiener-Neustadt Academy, he joined the Austrian Waldeck Infantry Regiment # 35 in 1758. By the time of the War of the Bavarian Succession he had risen in rank to Captain. In 1779 an inquiry acquitted him after he was accused of cowardice. He earned promotion to Major in 1784, Oberst-Leutnant in March 1787, and Oberst in October 1787.

== French Revolutionary Wars ==
=== General officer ===
In early 1793, Sebottendorf became a General-Major and led a brigade in Luxembourg. On 2 September 1794, he distinguished himself in a minor action near Öttringen.

=== Montenotte ===
On 4 March 1796, Sebottendorf received promotion to Feldmarschall-Leutnant in the Austrian army defending the Kingdom of Sardinia-Piedmont. Johann Peter Beaulieu appointed him commander of the left wing, including the brigades of Wilhelm Kerpen, Anton Schübirz von Chobinin, Franz Nicoletti, and Gerhard Rosselmini. In early April, Beaulieu initiated the Montenotte Campaign by sending two columns to attack Voltri, now a suburb of Genoa. Sebottendorf led one column of 3,200 troops south across the Turchino Pass, while Philipp Pittoni von Dannenfeld took 4,000 soldiers over the Bochetta Pass farther east. The campaign ended with Napoleon Bonaparte's French Army of Italy forcing Piedmont to sue for peace. The Austrian army fell back to defend the Duchy of Milan.

=== Lodi ===
In early May, Bonaparte turned Beaulieu's southern flank and won the Battle of Fombio. This forced a major part of the Austrian army to retreat east across the Adda River at Lodi. Beaulieu left Sebottendorf and 10,000 men in the vicinity of Lodi to cover his withdrawal. After the French advance guard under Claude Dallemagne drove the Austrian rear guard through Lodi, Sebottendorf prepared to defend the bridge that spanned the Adda on the east side of the town. The French artillery bombarded the Austrian position for several hours, as Bonaparte waited for André Masséna's division to arrive. In the ensuing Battle of Lodi on 10 May, the French defeated the outnumbered Austrians. Sebottendorf managed to carry out an orderly withdrawal, though his force lost 14 cannons and 2,036 soldiers killed, wounded, or missing.

=== Borghetto ===
During the Battle of Borghetto on 30 May, Sebottendorf commanded the Austrian left-center. Beaulieu's illness on the previous day threw the Austrian high command into disarray. With no overall coordination, each subordinate looked to his own sector. Sebottendorf focused upon a feint attack while the main French effort seized Valeggio sul Mincio. Later in the day, he tried to retake Valeggio but was unable to evict the French. His division remained intact and rejoined the rest of the army in the upper Adige River valley.

=== Castiglione ===
During Dagobert von Wurmser's first relief of the Siege of Mantua, Sebottendorf led a sub-unit of Michael von Melas' Right-Center Column consisting of the brigades of Nicoletti and Pittoni. On 29 July, Sebottendorf captured French positions at Madonna della Corona and Brentino Belluno. This success allowed him to link up with Paul Davidovich and the Left-Center Column from the Adige valley. On 5 August, he fought in the Battle of Castiglione.

=== Bassano ===
In the second relief of Mantua, Sebottendorf led a 4,086-man division down the Brenta River valley. He participated in the Battle of Bassano, after which his division "was reduced to only one and a third battalions, four and a half companies, and two squadrons." He subsequently joined Wurmser in a dash for Mantua. The bulk of the Austrians reached the fortress intact, but Sebottendorf and his soldiers were cooped up in Mantua for the duration of the long siege, during which many of the men died.

== Later career ==
Sebottendorf served as assistant to the commanding generals in Inner Austria and the Tyrol during the period 1801 to 1806. He was deputy to the President of the Military Appellate Court from 1813 to 1818. He died in Vienna on 11 April 1818 with the noble title of Freiherr.

== Family ==
Two younger Sebottendorf brothers, Franz Ludwig (1741–1822) and Ignaz Anton (1749–1821) also served in the Austrian army and achieved general officer rank. Franz commanded a brigade at the Battle of Stockach in 1799. At the beginning of the 1809 campaign, Ignaz led the Graz Landwehr infantry. Ignaz also commanded a brigade at the Battle of the Piave on 7–8 May 1809 and at the Battle of Raab on 14 June.
