= Jean Joseph François Sahuguet Damarzit de Laroche =

French general (1756–1802)

General of Division Jean Joseph François Léonard Sahuguet (French: [ʒɑ̃ ʒozɛf fʁɑ̃swa leɔnaʁ sayɡɛ]; 12 October 1756, Brive-la-Gaillarde – 26 December 1802, Tobago) was a French general during the French Revolution.

He was born the son of François de Sahuguet d'Amarzit, seigneur de La Roche.

== Service ==
He entered military service on April 30, 1773, as a musketeer in the 1st company (Grey Musketeers), and was promoted sous-lieutenant in 1776 and capitaine in 1778. During the revolution he was made in 1791 lieutenant-colonel of the 14th Dragoons. He was promoted Maréchal de camp on September 28, 1792, and served in the Army of the Western Pyrenees during 1793. where, in 1793, he annexed the Val d'Aran. In 1801 he commanded the troops which embarked with Admiral Ganteaume on his unsuccessful expedition to relieve the French troops stranded in Egypt.

Suspended and arrested during the Reign of Terror for being of noble birth, he was then reinstated and made a general of division on June 13, 1795. He actively participated in the Italian Campaign of 1796–1800, where he directed the blockade of Mantua and captured the strategic bridge at Governolo.

After the Peace of Amiens, he was responsible for retaking possession of the Caribbean island of Tobago as captain general (decree of 22 Prairial year 10) (June 11, 1802) from November 1802 to 1803. He died there of yellow fever.

He had married Marie Geneviève Eichmann in 1795 and had a daughter Camille.

== Distinctions ==
- He is one of the 660 peopleto have his or her name engraved under the Arc de Triomphe. It appears as "SAHUGUET" in the 34th column.

== Sources ==
- http://thierry.pouliquen.free.fr/Generaux/gnxS.htm
- Six, Georges. Biographical Dictionary of the French Generals & Admirals of the Revolution and the Empire (1792-1814). Paris: G. Saffroy Bookstore, 1934, 2 vols. p. 410.
- Article based on a translation of the equivalent article in French Wikipedia.

Government offices
Preceded by Hugh Lyle Carmichael	Governor of Tobago; 1802-1803	Succeeded by Louis Cesar Gabriel Berthier
