= Jean Joseph Magdeleine Pijon =

French general (1758–1799)

- Born: 7 September 1758; Lavaur, Tarn, France
- Died: 5 April 1799 (aged 40); Isola della Scala, Italy
- Military career
- Allegiance: France
- Branch: Infantry
- Rank: General of Brigade
- Conflicts: French Revolutionary Wars; Battle of Loano; Montenotte Campaign; Action of Rivoli; Battle of Lonato; Battle of Rovereto; Battle of Bassano; Action of Cerea; Second Battle of Bassano; Battle of Verona; Battle of Magnano

Jean Joseph Magdeleine Pijon or Jean Pigeon (7 September 1758 – 5 April 1799) was a French general who was killed in combat during the French Revolutionary Wars. He led an attack column at Loano in late 1795. He commanded a brigade in Napoleon Bonaparte's French Army of Italy during several famous campaigns. In 1796 he fought at Lonato where he was briefly captured, Rovereto where he was in the forefront of the action, Bassano, Cerea where he led the advance guard, and early in the Arcole campaign where he was wounded. In Italy during 1799, he fought at Verona and met his death at Magnano. His surname is one of the 660 names inscribed under the Arc de Triomphe.

== War of the First Coalition ==
=== Loano and Voltri ===
Pijon was born on 7 September 1758 at Lavaur in what later became the department of Tarn in southwest France. Nothing is known about his early life. He joined the army of the French First Republic and rose in rank to become the chef de brigade of the 21st Line Infantry Demi-Brigade on 21 December 1793. He was promoted to general of brigade on 3 December 1794.

The year 1795 found Pijon serving in the Army of Italy. Pijon and Barthélemy Catherine Joubert led two storming columns in the Battle of Loano on 23 November 1795. The columns captured two hilltop redoubts defended by 1,200 Austrians and seven cannons. The French lost 2,500 killed and wounded and 500 captured, while inflicting 3,000 killed and wounded on their Austro-Sardinian opponents. In addition, the French captured 4,000 soldiers, 48 guns, and five colors.

An order of battle for 4 April 1796 listed Pijon as a brigadier in Amédée Emmanuel François Laharpe's division in the Montenotte Campaign. Laharpe's division consisted of the 17th and 22nd Light Infantry Demi-Brigades and the 32nd and 75th Line Infantry Demi-Brigades. On 24 March, Pijon led a task force made up of the 51st and 75th Line that occupied Voltri on the outskirts of Genoa. Among his responsibilities was the defense of a key redoubt on top of Monte Negino near Cairo Montenotte. Pleading sickness, he asked to be relieved on 31 March. Consequently, the Battle of Voltri on 10 April was conducted by Colonel Jean-Baptiste Cervoni.

=== Castiglione to Arcole ===
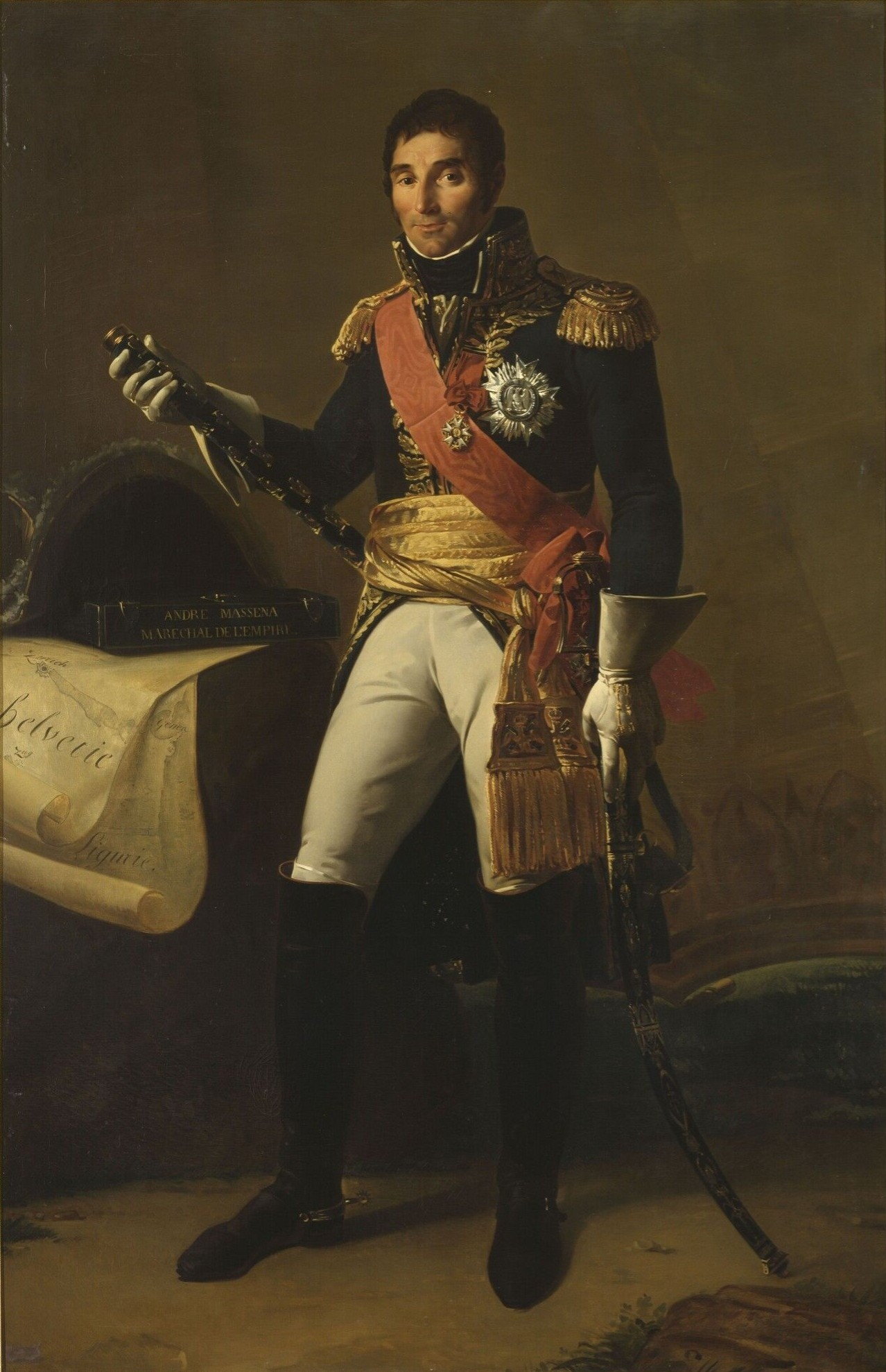
Pijon was in André Masséna's division during most of the 1796 campaign.

Pijon next appeared as one of six brigadiers in André Masséna's 15,391-man division in the order of battle for the Castiglione Campaign. On 29 July, the brigades of Pijon and Louis-Vincent-Joseph Le Blond de Saint-Hilaire were attacked by Dagobert Sigmund von Wurmser's Austrians at Rivoli Veronese. Outnumbered 22,000 to 10,000, the French were defeated with losses of 1,200 killed and wounded, and 1,600 men and nine guns captured. The Austrians counted 800 casualties. Still hoping to block Wurmser's advance, Masséna deployed Pijon and Claude Perrin Victor at Piovezzano near Pastrengo the next day.

The morning of 3 August marked the start of the very complex Battle of Lonato between the French and Peter Vitus von Quosdanovich's corps. Pijon was captured and his brigade was driven out of Lonato del Garda when Joseph Ocskay von Ocsko's Austrian column suddenly assaulted the town in the early hours. The defeated Quosdanovich decided to retreat into the mountains that night. In the confusion, one of his columns was cut off and elected to escape to the west. These troops arrived at Lonato at 5:00 AM on 4 August and were bluffed into surrendering by Bonaparte, who had only 1,200 troops on hand. Approximately 2,000 Austrians from Infantry Regiments De Vins Nr. 37 and Erbach Nr. 42 were made prisoners. This event released Pijon from captivity.

Bonaparte decided to launch three divisions in an offensive to the north. On 3 September 1796, Pijon reported to his army commander that the Austrians were defending Serravalle near Ala in the Trentino. Bonaparte ordered an attack and Pijon pushed Josef Philipp Vukassovich's soldiers out of the hamlet. He played an important role in the Battle of Rovereto on 4 September. His flanking move influenced the Austrians to retreat from Marco in the morning. Later in the day, he helped break through the enemy blocking position at Calliano. After beating the Austrians in the Battle of Bassano on 8 September, Bonaparte pursued Wurmser toward Mantua. Masséna caught up with the Austrians at Cerea on 11 September. At first, Pijon and Joachim Murat captured the town from Peter Karl Ott von Bátorkéz. Ott managed to retake the place and the French had to wait until Victor's brigade arrived before they attacked again at 2:00 PM. The bulk of Wurmser's column also arrived and the day ended in a French defeat with the loss of 736 prisoners and seven guns. The French suffered an additional 400 killed and wounded. Austrian losses are not known though the Esterhazy Infantry Regiment Nr. 34 was mauled in the action.

The 12 November 1796 order of battle for Arcole Campaign named Pijon as one of five brigade commanders in Masséna's 9,540-strong division. After being defeated in the Second Battle of Bassano and the Battle of Caldiero in early November, Bonaparte wrote a despairing letter to the French Directory. In it he claimed that his best soldiers and officers were dead or wounded. He listed 12 general officers who had been recently wounded and the list included Pijon. Apparently, Pijon did not recover from his wound in time for the Battle of Rivoli in January 1797 because he is not listed in the Rivoli Campaign order of battle.

== War of the Second Coalition ==
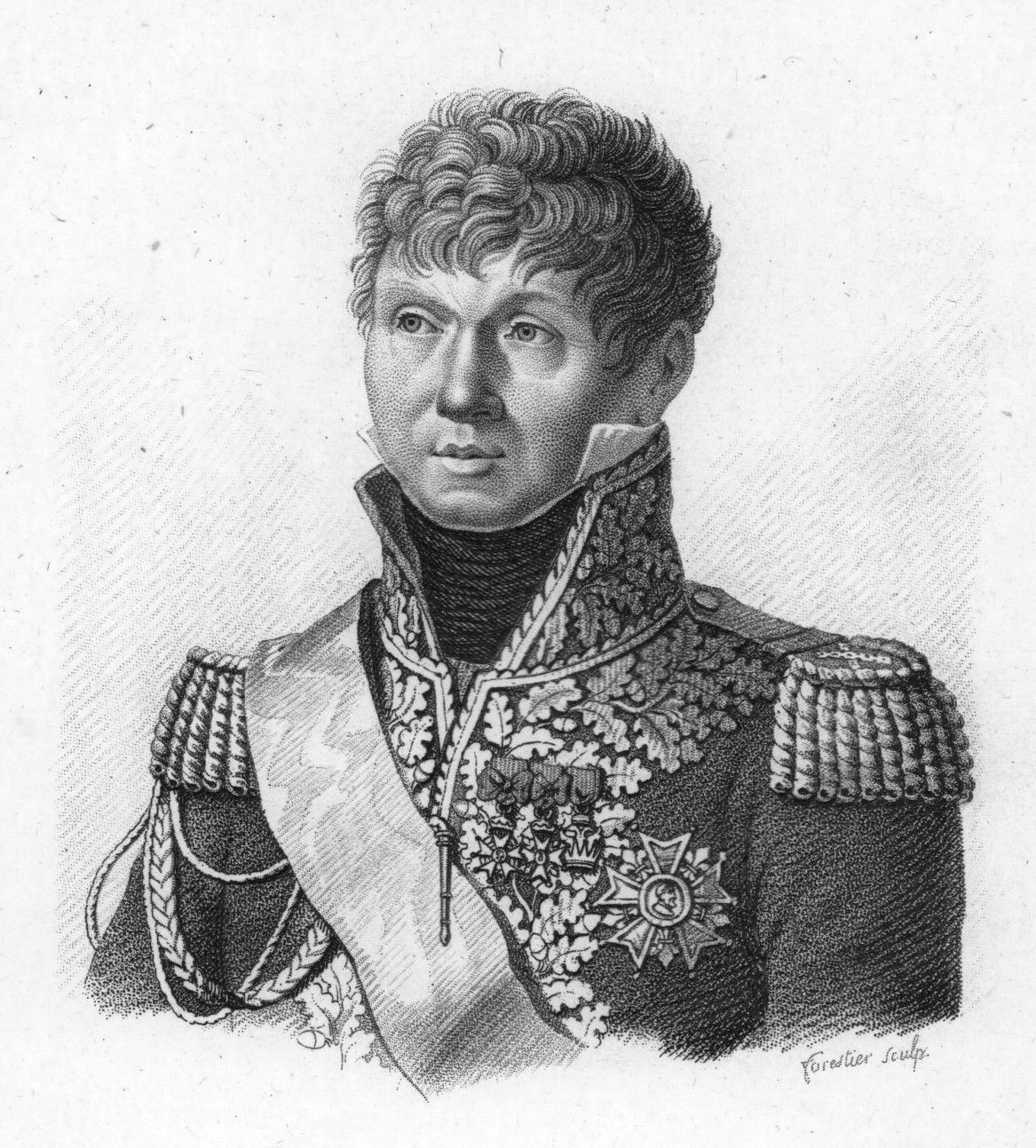
Pijon was in Claude Victor's division at Magnano.

Pijon fought at the Battle of Verona on 26 March 1799. In this action he and Jacques-Antoine de Chambarlhac de Laubespin were brigadiers in Victor's division. The division included the 56th, 92nd, and 99th Line Infantry Demi-Brigades, the 1st Helvetica Legion, the 1st Polish Legion, 1,000 cavalry, and one foot artillery battery. The action was inconclusive. At Pastrengo on the north, the French were successful, at Verona in the center neither side had the advantage, while at Legnago on the south, the Austrians were victorious.

At the Battle of Magnano on 5 April 1799, Pijon commanded 1,900 men of the 56th Line and 253 troopers of the 18th Cavalry Regiment in Victor's division. According to army commander Barthélemy Louis Joseph Schérer's plan, the divisions of Victor and Paul Grenier were to advance at dawn on the right flank. They got a late start and soon encountered Karl Mercandin's Austrian division about 11:00 AM. After a struggle, they overcame their opponents and killed Mercandin. However, the Austrian army commander Pál Kray launched a powerful counterattack which broke Victor's division and forced Grenier to retreat. During the confused French withdrawal, the Austrians got across Pijon's line of retreat near Villafontana. Pijon ordered a bayonet attack to break out of the trap, but it was repulsed. At this, the cohesion of the 56th Line collapsed and the regiment disintegrated. Some officers who tried to rally the demoralized soldiers were shot down by their own men. In the confusion, Pijon was fatally wounded, possibly by friendly fire. Most of the 56th Line's soldiers were soon rounded up and captured.

Pijon died on 5 April 1799 at Isola della Scala. PIJON is inscribed on Column 27 of the Arc de Triomphe.

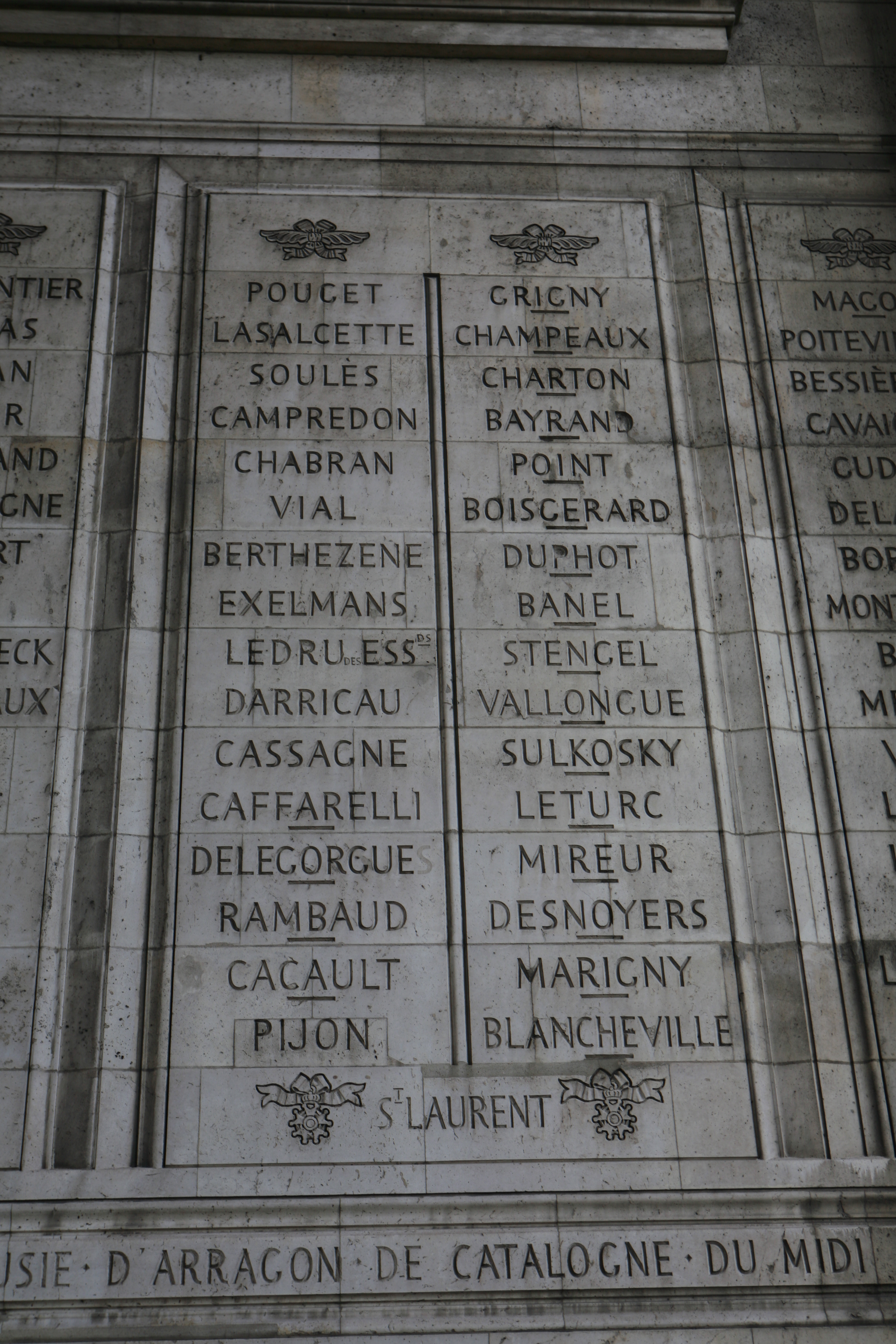
Pijon's name is inscribed on the Arc de Triomphe (near bottom left).
