= Battle of Rivoli order of battle =

In the Battle of Rivoli on 14 and 15 January 1797, the French Army of Italy led by Napoleon Bonaparte crushed the main Austrian army led by Jozsef Alvinczi. The battle occurred during the fourth Austrian attempt to relieve the Siege of Mantua. After crippling Alvinczi's army on the 14th, Bonaparte left Barthélemy Joubert and Gabriel Rey to finish off the Austrians and raced south with André Masséna to deal with a relief column led by Giovanni di Provera. On 16 January, Masséna, Pierre Augereau, and Jean Sérurier trapped Provera near the Mantua siege lines and forced his surrender.

== France ==
- Army of Italy: Napoleon Bonaparte (43,610)
  - Division: André Masséna (8,851 including 2 cavalry regiments)
    - Brigade: Jean-Charles Monnier
      - 18th Demi-Brigade (1,604)
      - 32nd Demi-Brigade (1,848)
    - Brigade: Guillaume Brune
      - 75th Demi-Brigade (2,373)
      - 25th Demi-Brigade (1,226)
    - Brigade: Charles Leclerc
      - 1st Cavalry Regiment (216)
      - 15th Dragoon Regiment (203)
      - 18th Light Infantry Demi-Brigade (1,150)
    - Artillery: 6 guns
  - Division: Pierre Augereau (8,665 including 4 cavalry regiments)
    - Brigade: Jean Guieu
    - Brigade: François Point
    - Brigade: Jean-Antoine Verdier
    - Brigade: Frédéric Walther (cavalry)
  - Division: Barthélemy Joubert (10,250 including 1 cavalry regiment)
    - Brigade: Honoré Vial
      - 4th Light Infantry Demi-Brigade (792)
      - 17th Light Infantry Demi-Brigade (784)
      - 22nd Light Infantry Demi-Brigade (1,332)
    - Brigade: Claude Lebley
      - 29th Light Infantry Brigade (1,258)
      - 33rd Demi-Brigade (1,965)
      - 85th Demi-Brigade (1,386)
    - Brigade: Thomas Sandos
      - 14th Demi-Brigade (1,358)
      - 39th Demi-Brigade (978)
      - 22nd Light Cavalry Regiment (205)
    - Artillery: 12 guns
  - Division: Gabriel Rey (4,156 including 2 cavalry regiments)
    - Brigade: Antoine Veaux
      - 8th Dragoon Regiment (207)
      - 12th Light Infantry Demi-Brigade (529)
    - Brigade: Louis Baraguey d'Hilliers
      - 59th Demi-Brigade (2,814)
      - 11th Light Infantry Demi-Brigade (254)
    - Brigade: Joachim Murat
      - Guides Regiment (322)
    - Artillery: 6 guns
  - Division: Jean Sérurier (10,230 including 2 cavalry regiments)
    - Alexandre Dumas and Claude Dallemagne each led small divisions under the supervision of Sérurier. It is unknown which brigades were assigned to each division.
    - Brigade: Jean Davin
    - Brigade: Sextius Miollis
    - Brigade: André Monleau
    - Brigade: Emmanuel de Serviez
    - Brigade: Jean de La Salcette
  - Reserve: Bonaparte
    - Brigade: Charles Dugua (658)
      - 3rd Dragoon Regiment
      - 10th Light Cavalry Regiment
    - Brigade: Claude Victor (1,800 including 1 cavalry regiment)
    - Brigade: Jean Lannes (2,000)

== Austria ==
- Field Army: FZM Jozsef Alvinczi (28,022)
  - Independent columns:
    - Brigade 1: OB Franz de Lusignan (4,556)
      - 4,556 in 4 bns and 12 coys
    - Brigade 2: GM Anton Lipthay (5,065)
      - 5,065 in 4 bns and 6 coys
    - Brigade 3: GM Samuel Köblös (4,138)
      - 4,138 in 5 bns and 6 coys
    - Brigade 6: GM Josef Vukassovich (2,871)
      - 2,795 in 3 bns and 5 coys, 76 in 1/2 sqn
  - Division: FML Peter Quasdanovich
    - Brigade 4: GM Joseph Ocskay (3,521)
      - 2,692 in 4 bns, 829 in 8 sqns
    - Brigade 5: GM Heinrich XV, Prince of Reuss-Plauen (7,871)
      - 6,986 in 9 bns, 885 in 5-1/2 sqns
- Corps at Vicenza: GM Adam Bajalics (6,241)
  - 6,081 in 6 bns, 160 in 1 sqn
- Corps at Padua: FML Giovanni di Provera (9,097)
  - 8,379 in 10 bns, 718 in 8-1/2 sqns
- Corps at Borgo Valsugana: GM Anton Mittrowsky (3,570)
  - 3,497 in 4 bns, 73 in 1/2 sqn
- Mantua Garrison: FM Dagobert von Wurmser (18,493, including 9,800 fit for service)

=== Key ===
- FM: Feldmarschall, army commander
- FZM: Feldzeugmeister, army or corps commander
- FML: Feldmarschal-Leutnant, corps or division commander
- GM: General-major, brigade commander
- OB: Oberst or colonel
- bns: infantry battalions
- coys: light infantry companies
- sqns: cavalry squadrons
