= Battle of Magnano =

1799 Battle during the War of the Second Coalition

- Part of the French Revolutionary Wars
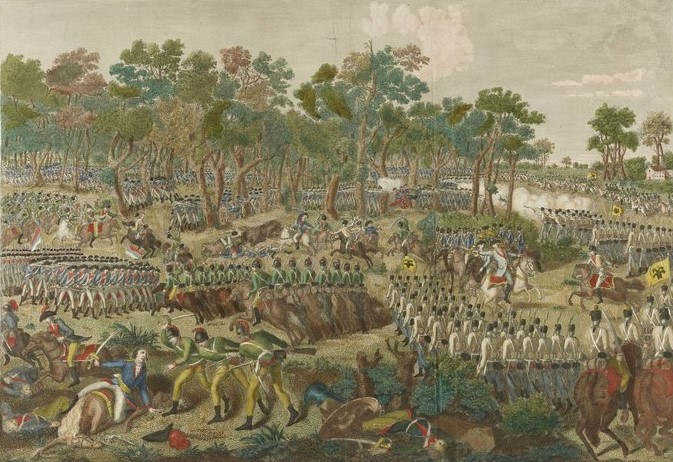
- Engraving by Luigi Pizzi, 1799
| Date | 5 April 1799 |
| Location | near Buttapietra, present-day Italy 45.3642°N 10.9921°E |
| Result | Austrian victory |

Belligerents
| (French First Republic) French Republic | Habsburg monarchy |

Commanders and leaders
| (French First Republic) Barthélemy Schérer | (Habsburg monarchy) Pál Kray |

Strength
| 41,000 | 46,000 |

Casualties and losses
| 8,000 | 6,000 |
- Location within Europe

War of the Second Coalition:
Italy
current battle
Napoleon in command
Napoleon not in command

In the Battle of Magnano on 5 April 1799, an Austrian army commanded by Pál Kray defeated a French army led by Barthélemy Schérer. In subsequent battles, which are united under the heading of Suvorov's Italian campaign, the Austrians and their Russian allies drove the French out of nearly all of Italy. This action was fought during the War of the Second Coalition, part of the French Revolutionary Wars. In terms of troop numbers and casualty ratios, the battle became nearly identical to the Battle of Verona on 26 March the same year during the same Italian campaign; however, this time all the figures favored the Austrians.

== Background ==
After the Treaty of Campo Formio, only Great Britain remained at war with the French First Republic. However, a heavy-handed and acquisitive French foreign policy soon provoked Austria and Russia, and led to the formation of the Second Coalition.

In Switzerland, hostilities between France and Austria began in early March 1799. In Germany, the Austrians won the Battle of Stockach on 25 March. The next day, fighting occurred along the Adige River between the opposing forces of General of Division Schérer and Feldmarschall-Leutnant Kray. In the Battle of Verona, the French scored a success at Pastrengo and fought a drawn battle near Austrian-held Verona, but the Austrians managed to get across the Adige at Legnago. To defend Verona, Kray concentrated his army in its vicinity. Schérer's army faced north toward Verona, with the French-held fortress of Mantua to his southwest. The French general considered crossing the Adige below Verona to flank Kray out of Verona, but heavy rains thwarted his plan. By 5 April, the two armies confronted each other on a rain-sodden field near the hamlet of Magnano, south of Verona.

== Battle ==
Schérer deployed 41,000 soldiers in the divisions of Generals of Division Joseph Hélie Désiré Perruquet de Montrichard, Claude Perrin Victor, Jacques Maurice Hatry, Antoine Guillaume Delmas de la Coste, Jean-Mathieu-Philibert Sérurier, and Paul Grenier. The French total included 6,800 cavalry attached to the divisions. Kray's 46,000-man army included his own division and the divisions of Feldmarschall-Leutnants Karl Mercandin, Michael von Fröhlich, Konrad Valentin von Kaim, and Johann Zoph.

Schérer sent the divisions of Victor and Grenier to attack on the right flank. Jean Victor Marie Moreau led the divisions of Hatry and Montrichard to attack in the center. Serurier's division on the left flank struck northwest to Villafranca to protect Moreau's flank. Delmas, with the reserve, marched forward to fill the gap that opened between the French right flank and Moreau as the latter moved north.

Because Kray advanced at the same time as the French, Magnano is a meeting engagement. The Austrian commander appointed Mercandin to lead the left column, Kaim to direct the center column, and Zoph to command his right column. General-major Prince Friedrich Franz Xaver of Hohenzollern-Hechingen led a reserve division on the right, while Kray held back a second reserve division under General-major Franz Joseph, Marquis de Lusignan.

On the east flank, Victor and Grenier defeated the outnumbered Mercandin, who was killed. They pressed north toward Verona. Kray committed Hohenzollern's reserve to assist Zoph's right flank division. Serurier engaged in a back-and-forth struggle all day but he finally seized his objective. Moreau pushed back the Austrians in his front, but did not score a notable success. Delmas was late, but he engaged Kaim and drove him back.

One historian writes, "Schérer went into this battle without forming a reserve and was thus unable to react to crisis and opportunities effectively." By this point in the action, Schérer's divergent attacks had spread his troops across a wide front. Kray launched Lusignan's reserve at the so-far victorious French right wing. This attack sent Victor and Grenier reeling back to the south and opened a large gap in the French battle line. Kray sent troops against the exposed right flank of Delmas and drove him back also. During the disorderly retreat, the Austrians managed to cut off and capture one of Victor's demi-brigades.

== Result ==
The French lost 3,500 killed and wounded, including General of Brigade Jean Joseph Magdeleine Pijon, who was mortally wounded. In addition, the Austrians captured 4,500 soldiers, 18 guns, 40 vehicles, and seven colors. The Austrians suffered 4,000 killed and wounded, plus 2,000 captured. Mercandin and General-major Johann Kovacsevich were killed. After the French defeat, Schérer retreated to the Adda River, abandoning several defensible river lines. The city of Brescia fell on 21 April. In late April, the discredited Schérer relinquished army command to Moreau. The victor, Kray, was quickly promoted to Feldzeugmeister. The next major action was the Battle of Cassano on 27 April.

== See also ==
- Battle of Verona (1799), 26 March 1799
- Battle of Cassano (1799), 27–28 April 1799
- Battle of Trebbia (1799), 17–20 June 1799
- Battle of Novi (1799), 15 August 1799

== Footnotes ==
| Preceded by Battle of Stockach (1799) | French Revolution: Revolutionary campaigns Battle of Magnano | Succeeded by Battle of Cassano (1799) |
