= Tyrolean expedition (1797) =

Expedition in Tyrol
- Part of the Italian campaign of 1796–1797 in the War of the First Coalition
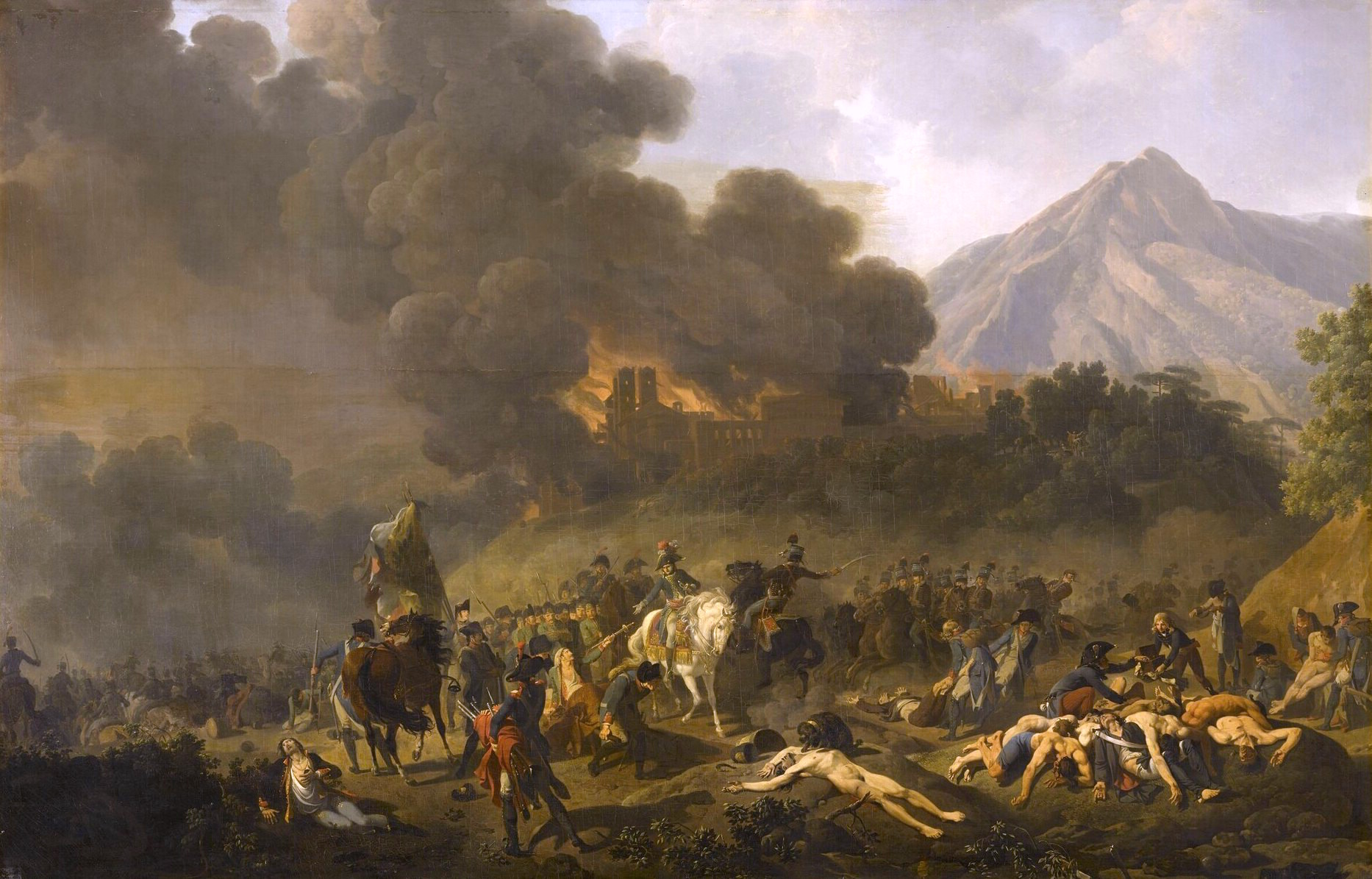
- Napoleon gathers prisoners on the battlefield (1797)
Date	20 March – 5 May 1797
Location	County of Tyrol, Italy
Result	French victory

Belligerents
(French First Republic) French Republic	(Habsburg monarchy) Austria

Commanders and leaders
(French First Republic) Catherine Joubert (French First Republic) Antoine Guillaume	(Habsburg monarchy) Wilhelm Lothar

Strength
18,000	12,000

Casualties and losses
8,000	Unknown

The Expedition in Tyrol was carried out in the spring of 1797, during the final phases of the Italian campaign, when Napoleon Bonaparte decided to launch the final attack against the Holy Roman Empire.

While Napoleon launched an attack towards Austria through Friuli and the Tarvisio pass, a secondary army was ordered to cross Tyrol, and then rejoined with the bulk of the forces in the Drava valley.

== History ==
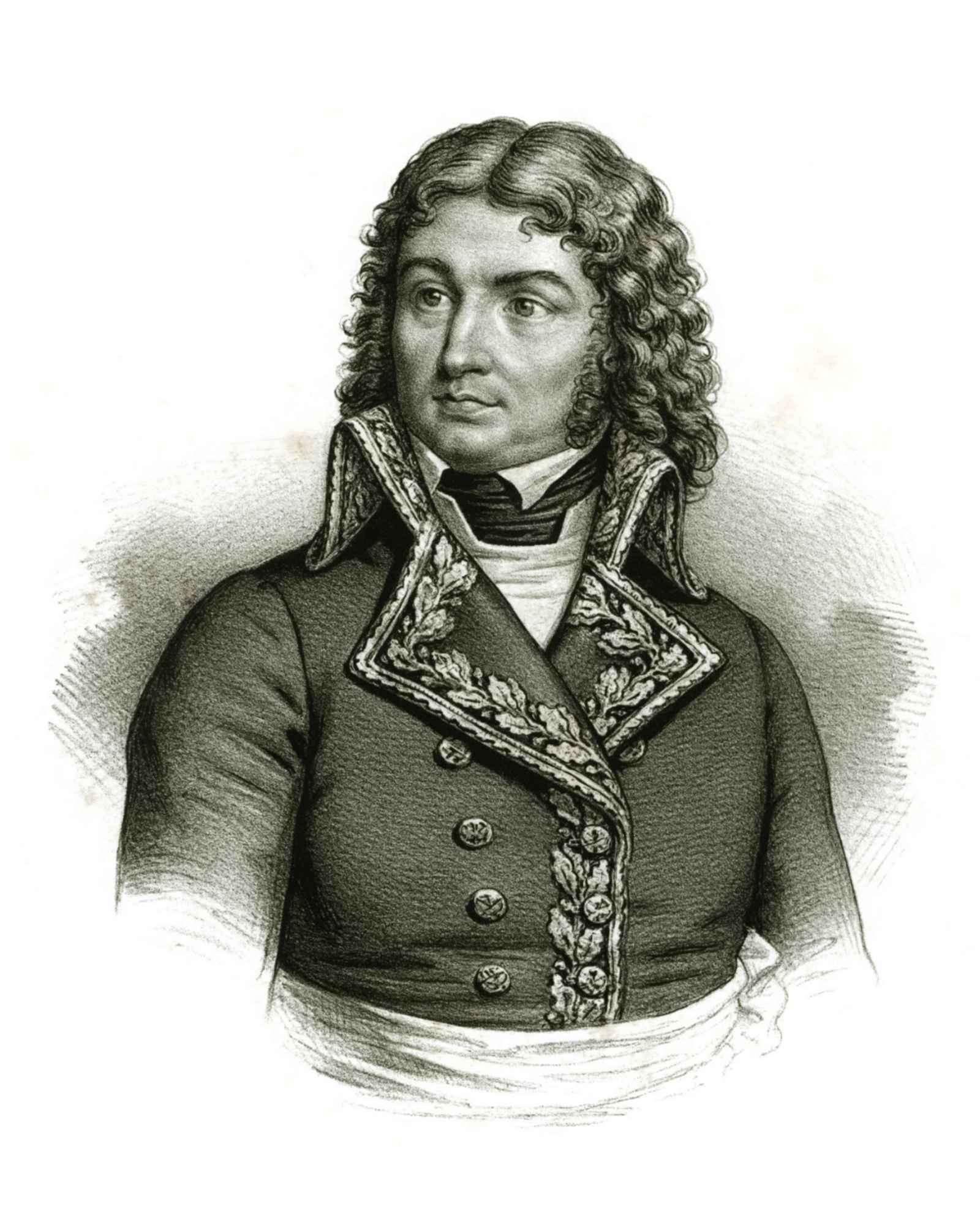
General Barthélemy Catherine Joubert led the expedition through the Tyrol, repeatedly defeating his opponents.

=== Background ===
In the decisive Battle of Rivoli of January 1797, during the military operations of the First Coalition, Napoleon Bonaparte had routed the Holy Roman army Empire and had assumed military control of all of Italy, with the exception of the north-east. He therefore decided to move towards Friuli and from there bring the war directly to Austria, in order to deliver the decisive blow to the Holy Roman Empire. The French government placed most of the available reinforcements at Napoleon's disposal, making the German theater a subordinate one. The division generals Jean-Baptiste Bernadotte and Antoine Guillaume Delmas were therefore transferred to Italy with their respective divisions.

The Archduke Charles, who had 50,000 men under his orders, who however were dispersed over a vast forehead. Bonaparte was determined to attack the Archduke Charles before his troops were fully operational.

With 60,000 men at his disposal, Bonaparte planned an attack across Friuli with two-thirds of his troops.

The remaining third was entrusted to General Joubert, who was ordered to cross the County of Tyrol, and then rejoin the rest of the forces in the surroundings of Villach. In this way Napoleon wanted to secure Italy from possible attacks coming from the North.

Napoleon's offensive began in March. The main French army soon forced Archduke Charles' forces into a hasty retreat.

=== The forces ===
Joubert's army with 18,000 men found itself facing that of Field Marshal Lieutenant Wilhelm Lothar Maria von Kerpen strong of 12,000 men, divided into five battalions, two regular infantry regiments plus elements of a third, three squadrons of dragons and 5,000 militiamen (Schutzen).

=== Start of military operations ===
The first clash took place on 20 March at Salorno: Joubert repelled his opponent who lost 300 men between dead and wounded, as well as 3,500 prisoners, while he lost 200 men between dead and wounded.

On 21 March at Egna the French general repelled an attack by Major General Johann Ludwig Alexius von Loudon, who commanded a brigade composed mainly of Schützen.

Meanwhile, from 21 to 23 March, the bulk of Napoleon's troops faced the Austrians in the Battle of Tarvisio; once the Austrians were defeated, the door was opened for Napoleon to enter the heart of Austria. Leaving behind a division of 5,000 men under Antoine Guillaume Delmas, to guard the supply lines, Joubert then advanced towards Chiusa where he again defeated von Kerpen on 22 March.

The Austrians at this point retreated north-east to Mezzaselva all'Isarco where they were defeated again on 28 March. This time they had to retreat to Vipiteno. From here across the Brenner, the French directly threatened the Inn valley and the Tyrolean capital Innsbruck. However, as the general mobilization of the Schützen was now underway, Joubert deemed it prudent to fortify himself in Bressanone: he feared in fact being overwhelmed by the sheer force of numbers.

=== The entrenchment in Bressanone ===
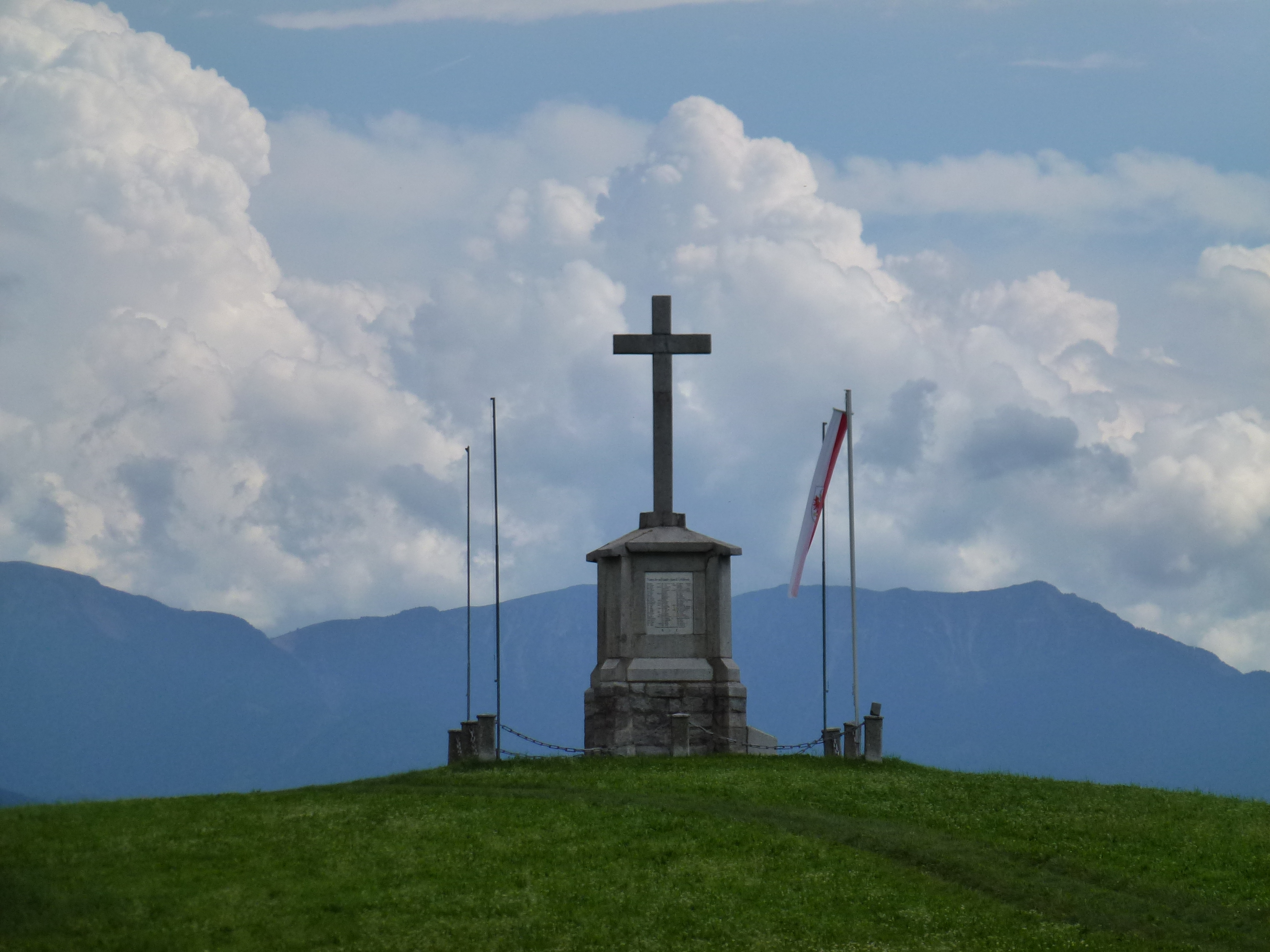
Commemorative cross made on a granite base in memory of the Spinga Clash of 2 April 1797. Despite being celebrated as a "Tyrolean victory", this clash nevertheless had an uncertain outcome.

On 31 March von Kerpen attacked the French at Bressanone, but was unable to drive them out.

After receiving 12,000 reinforcements, thanks to the arrival of Loudon's Schützen brigade and having numerically superior forces, the Imperials planned to attack the enemy forces in Bressanone and Bolzano at five points simultaneously.

The plan, put into action on April 2, largely failed: in four out of five places the Tyrolese and Austrians were repelled or did not attack at all. The exception was Captain Philip von Wörndle who commanded the North Tyrol companies (Sonnenburg, Rettenberg, Axams and Stubai) repelled the French at Spinga Clash, a clash which however ended with the withdrawal of the Tyroleans.

=== The reunion with Napoleon ===
On 4 April, despite the successes obtained by the French, Delmas with his 5,000 men preferred to retreat towards Bolzano to escape the continuous pressure to which his troops were subjected. The following day Joubert set off in the direction of Villach, marching through the Pusteria Valley and the Gail Valley, to then reach the bulk of the French troops, as expected by the orders received. After several skirmishes with the Schützen, his column finally reunited with the troops commanded by Napoleon on 8 May. Despite the success of his campaign, Joubert arrived too late, as on 17 April the Habsburgs had resigned themselves to asking for peace, signing the armistice of Leoben. During the Tyrolean campaign it is estimated that French losses may have reached 8,000 men.

== Aftermath ==
The subsequent Treaty of Campo Formio confirmed Habsburg dominion over both the Principality of Trento and the County of Tyrol. The Habsburgs, however, had to renounce Lombardy, obtaining in exchange the territory of the Republic of Venice, which ceased to exist.

== Sources ==
- David G. Chandler (2006). The Campaigns of Napoleon, vol. I. Milan: BUR. ISBN 88-17-11904-0.
- Carl von Clausewitz (2012). The Campaign of 1796 in Italy. Milan: Edizioni Libreria Militare. ISBN 978-88-89660-16-4.
- Luigi Mascilli Migliorini [in Italian] (2001). Napoleone. Rome: Salerno editrice. ISBN 88-8402-350-5.
- Digby Smith (1998). The Greenhill Napoleonic Wars Data Book. London: Greenhill. ISBN 1-85367-276-9.
- Maximilian Yorck von Wartenburg [in German] (2012). Napoleon as a General — Volume I. Andrews UK Limited. ISBN 9781781513330.
