= Karl Mercandin =

Austrian general

- Died: 13 April 1799 Verona, Italy
- Allegiance: Habsburg monarchy
- Branch: Cavalry, Infantry
- Rank: Feldmarschall-Leutnant
- Conflicts: War of the First Coalition; Battle of Mainz; Battle of Biberach; War of the Second Coalition; Battle of Verona; Battle of Magnano †

Ignaz Karl Mercandin (d. 13 April 1799) became an Austrian general during the French Revolutionary Wars. He was promoted Generalmajor in 1792 and commanded a cavalry brigade at Mainz in 1795. Promoted to Feldmarschall-Leutnant, he served in the Rhine campaign of 1796 as a division commander. In 1799, he led a division at Verona and Magnano. Mortally wounded in the latter battle, he died a week later.
