= Louis André Bon =

French general (1758–1799)

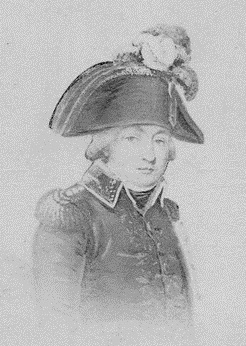
- General of Division Louis André Bon
- Born: 25 October 1758; Romans-sur-Isère in Dauphiné
- Died: 19 May 1799 (aged 40) Acre, Eyalet of Sidon, Ottoman Empire
- Allegiance: Kingdom of France; French First Republic
- Branch: French Army
- Rank: Division General
- Commands: 8e division militaire
- Conflicts: American Revolutionary War; French Revolutionary Wars; Italian campaigns; Invasion of Egypt and Syria; Siege of Acre †

Louis André Bon (French pronunciation: [lwi ɑ̃dʁe bɔ̃]; 25 October 1758 in Romans-sur-Isère, Dauphiné – 19 May 1799 in Acre) was a French general of the French Revolutionary Wars, best known for his participation in the 1798 Invasion of Egypt and Syria.

== Life ==
He first enrolled very young in the régiment Royal-Infanterie, and took part in the American Revolutionary War. Commanding a battalion of national volunteers in 1792, he rejoined Dugommier on the frontier between France and Spain, soon becoming chef de brigade, fighting bravely at the siege of Bellegarde and being promoted to général de brigade.

He fought under Napoleon and Charles-Pierre Augereau in the Army of Italy and was wounded whilst urging on his men on the bridge at Arcole. After the peace of Campo Formio, he commanded the 8e division militaire (Marseille), where he brought an end to the disorders caused by the White Terror, as he also did at Avignon.

Promoted to général de division, he set out for Egypt, distinguishing himself at the capture of Alexandria, making a vital contribution to the capture of Cairo (by attacking an important enemy position), acting as one of the commanders of the left wing at the Battle of the Pyramids and contributing to the unexpected success at Mont-Thabor (in attacking the rear of the enemy attacked from the front by Jean-Baptiste Kléber). He also fought at the taking of El-Arish, the raising of the siege of Gaza and the capture of Jaffa.

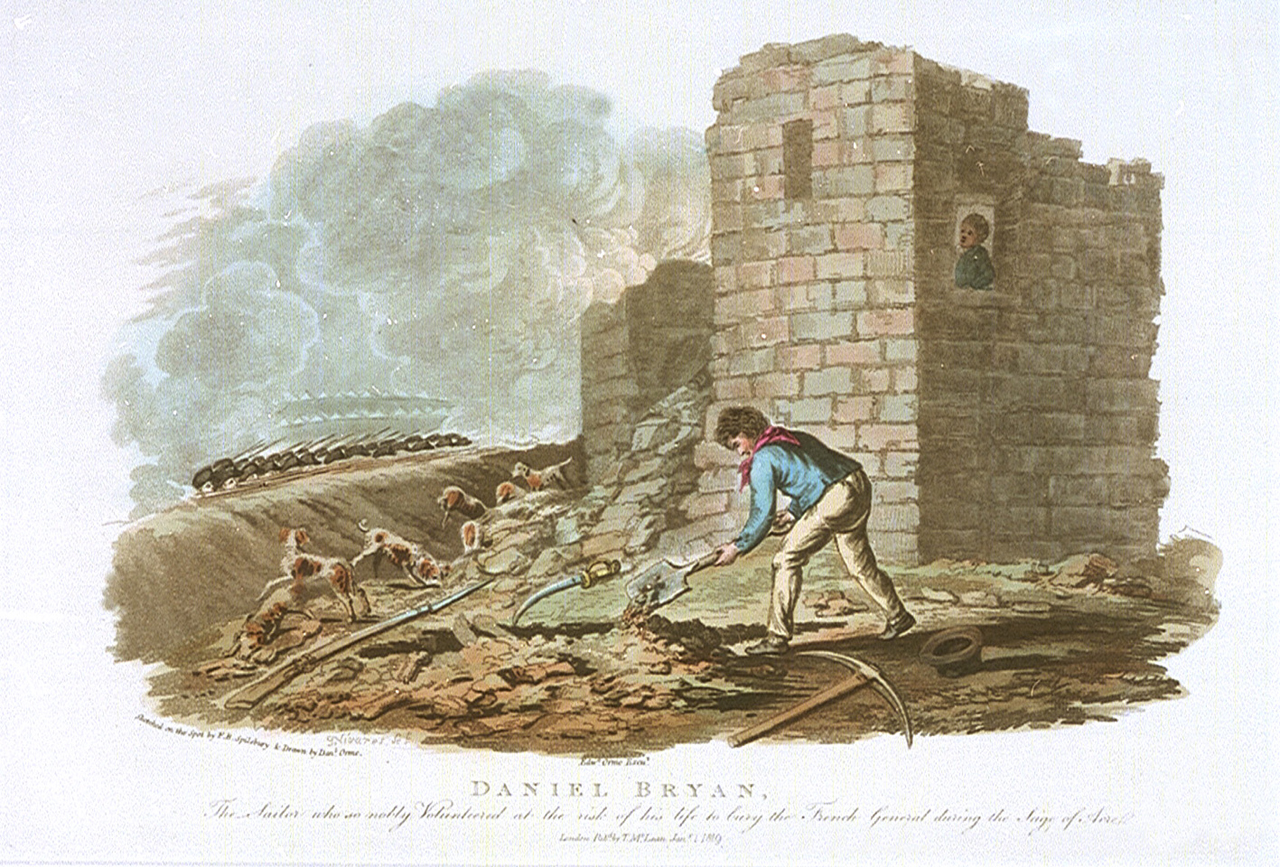
Daniel Bryan, a sailor from HMS Tigre volunteered at the risk of his life to bury the French General during the Siege of Acre the following day.

He was finally mortally wounded before the walls of Acre, on 10 May 1799, at the head of his grenadiers, at the foot of the breach, in the last assault on the town.

== Family ==
14 years later Napoleon (now emperor) visited the école militaire de Saint-Germain and asked for the name of one of the students he had just reviewed – it was general Bon's son. On being asked by Napoleon, "Where is your mother?", he replied "In Paris, on a fourth floor, where she is dying of hunger". Napoleon instantly granted the general's widow an allowance, and created her son baron de l'Empire, also granting him an allowance.

== Distinctions ==
- He is one of the 558 officers whose names are engraved on the Arc de Triomphe.

== Sources ==
- Mullié, Charles (1852). "Bon (Louis André)" . Biographie des célébrités militaires des armées de terre et de mer de 1789 à 1850 (in French). Paris: Poignavant et Compagnie.
