= Battle of the Pyramids =

1798 battle of the French invasion of Egypt and Syria

- Part of the French invasion of Egypt and Syria
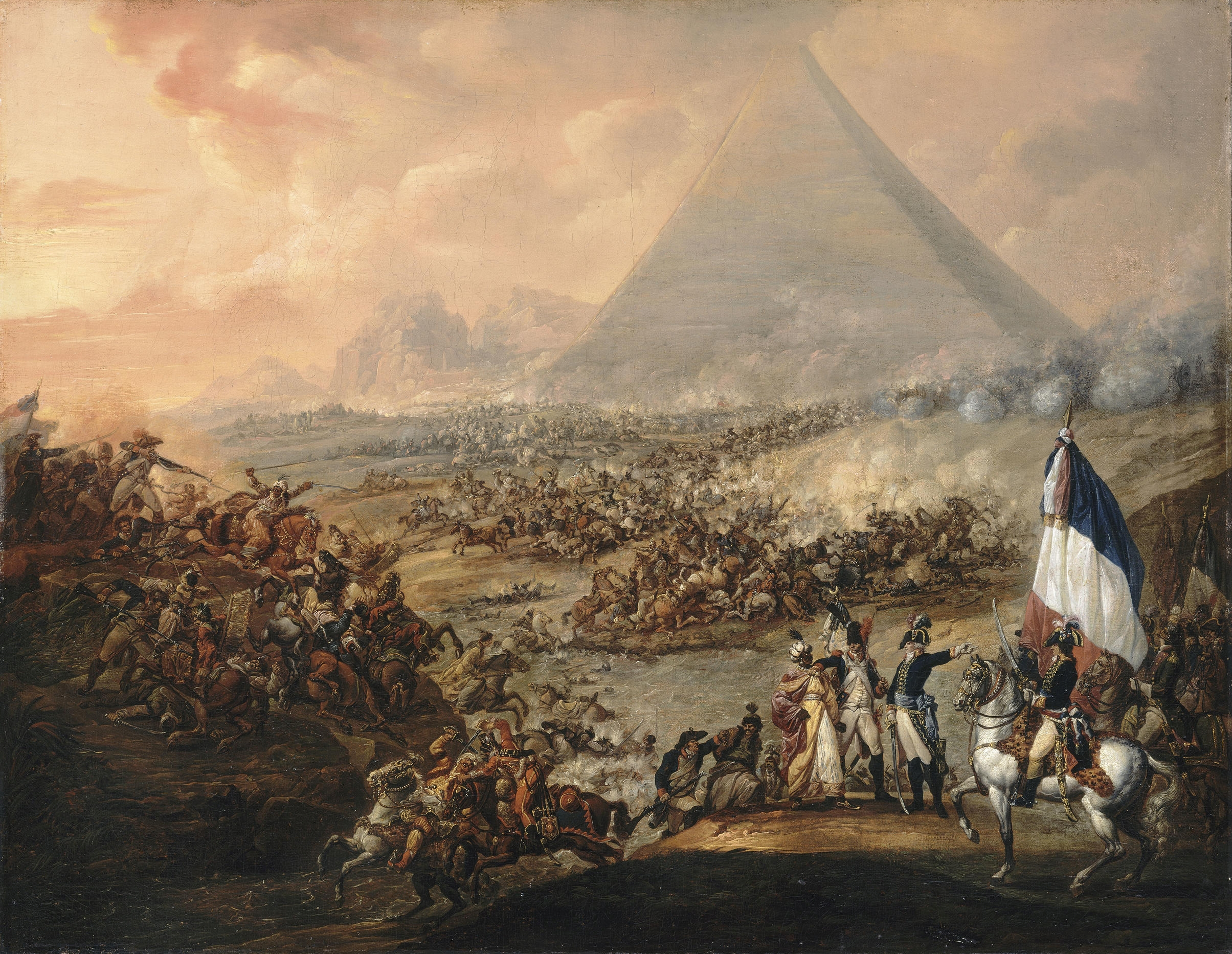
- The Battle of the Pyramids; François-Louis-Joseph Watteau, 1799
Date	21 July 1798
Location	Near Embabeh, Ottoman Egypt 30°5′N 31°12′E
Result	French victory

Belligerents
France	Ottoman Empire

Commanders and leaders
Napoleon Bonaparte; Louis Desaix; Louis André Bon; Honoré Vial; Jean Reynier; Thomas-Alexandre Dumas	Murad Bey; Ibrahim Bey; Ayyub Bey †

Strength
25,000 (Note: Historian David Chandler asserts that Bonaparte's 25,000-strong army outnumbered Murad's 6,000 Mamluks and 15,000 infantry, while Andrew Roberts indicates a force of 6,000 Mamluks and 54,000 Arab irregulars against 20,000 French, military historian Gustave Léon Niox gives a total of 50,000 Mamluks and irregulars. According to Paul Strathern author of Napoleon in Egypt, “There is no denying that the combined Egyptian force was superior in number but the caliber of some of its conscripted men cannot be compared with that of the French”): 3,000 cavalry; 17,000 infantry	21,000–50,000: 6,000+ cavalry; 15,000–54,000 infantry

Casualties and losses
29 killed 260 wounded	10,000 killed or wounded: 7,000 Mamluks killed
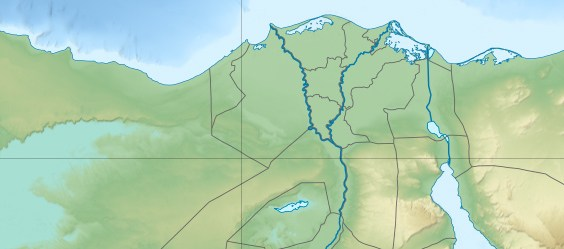
- Location within Lower Egypt Battle of the Pyramids (Mediterranean)

The Battle of the Pyramids (French: Bataille des Pyramides), also known as the Battle of Embabeh (bataille d'Embabech), was fought on 21 July 1798 during the French invasion of Egypt and Syria. Occurring near the village of Embabeh, Ottoman Egypt, the battle was named by Napoleon after the distant Great Pyramid of Giza.

After capturing Alexandria and advancing toward Cairo, Napoleon's army confronted Murad Bey's Mamluk-led forces. The French deployed into large divisional squares that withstood repeated cavalry charges before storming the fortified village of Embabeh. French losses were reported at about 300, while estimates for Mamluk–Ottoman casualties vary widely, from several thousand to as many as 10,000. The defeat shattered Murad's field army, forcing him to retreat to Upper Egypt.

The victory opened the way to Cairo, where Napoleon established a new administration, though local uprisings soon followed. It also marked the decline of Mamluk rule in Egypt. Its strategic impact was blunted when a British fleet under Vice-admiral Horatio Nelson defeated the French navy at the Battle of the Nile ten days later. The battle has since been depicted in art and popular culture, with some reviews being critical of historical inaccuracies.

== Prelude ==
After landing in Ottoman-controlled Egypt and capturing Alexandria on 2 July 1798, the French army under General Bonaparte marched across the desert toward Cairo. Their objective was to break the power of the Mamluk beys who dominated Egypt and secure control of the capital before Ottoman reinforcements could arrive. Murad Bey and Ibrahim Bey, two Georgian Mamluks who commanded the country’s military forces, prepared to oppose the advance. Their army included elite, heavily armoured cavalry supported by fellahin militia serving as infantry.

The French encountered the Mamluks about 9 miles (14 kilometres) from the Pyramids and 4 miles (6.4 kilometres) from Cairo. (Note: Engulfed by the west bank of modern Cairo, nothing remains of the battlefield today.) On 13 July, French scouts located Murad’s encampment near Shubra Khit. Bonaparte ordered an immediate advance, leading to the skirmish at Shubra Khit (also called Chobrakit). French artillery destroyed the Mamluk flagship on the Nile and forced a retreat, giving Bonaparte his first victory and demonstrating the effectiveness of concentrated firepower against cavalry charges.

== Battle ==
On 21 July, after marching all night, the French reached the vicinity of the village of Embabeh. After a short rest, Napoleon ordered his troops to form for battle. Each of the five divisions was organised into hollow rectangles with cavalry and baggage in the centre and cannon at the corners. He exhorted his men to remain steady when facing the Mamluk cavalry:

Soldiers! You came to this country to save the inhabitants from barbarism, to bring civilisation to the Orient and subtract this beautiful part of the world from the domination of England. From the top of those pyramids, forty centuries are contemplating you.

— General Bonaparte, Order of the Day,

The French advanced south in echelon, with the right flank leading and the left secured by the Nile. From right to left, the divisions were commanded by Louis Desaix, Jean-Louis-Ébénézer Reynier, Charles-François-Joseph Dugua, Honoré Vial, and Louis André Bon. Desaix also sent a detachment to occupy the nearby village of Biktil. Murad anchored his right on the Nile at Embabeh, which was fortified with infantry and artillery, and his left on Biktil with additional guns. His Mamluk cavalry deployed in the centre. Across the Nile, the army of Ibrahim Bey watched the battle unfold but was unable to cross and intervene. Murad’s plan was to hold the French on his fortified flanks and then strike their centre with cavalry. Repeated cavalry charges were directed against the French squares. One armoured rider advanced to within a few steps of the French lines and demanded a duel, but was shot down by musket fire.

At about 15:30 Murad ordered his defterdar, Ayyub Bey, to lead a mass assault. The divisions of Desaix, Reynier, and Dugua held firm, repelling the horsemen with musketry and artillery. Some of the Mamluks then attempted to attack Desaix’s detached force, but without success.

The Column that moved forward to attack Murad Bey divided in a way known to them during wartimes, and they got closer to the barricades where they then surrounded all the soldiers, front and back, and they beat their drums and started to shoot their guns and cannons; the winds blew strong, and dust flew, and the skies darkened from the dust and gun smoke; people were deafened by the drum beats and people thought that the Earth had moved like a quake and that the skies had fallen; the war and the fighting continued for about three-quarters of an hour and then there was defeat on the Western Front.

— ʻAbd al-Rah̤mān al-Jabartī's History of Egypt, recounting how the Mamlouks were defeated at the gates of Cairo

Near the river, Bon’s division deployed into attack columns and stormed Embabeh. The garrison broke, with many fleeing into the Nile where hundreds drowned. French reports listed 29 killed and 260 wounded. Murad’s losses were far heavier, with thousands killed or wounded, including Ayyub Bey and perhaps 3,000 of the elite Mamluk cavalry. Murad himself was wounded in the cheek by a saber but escaped with several thousand cavalry to Upper Egypt, where he waged a guerrilla campaign before being defeated by Desaix in late 1799.

== Aftermath ==
Upon hearing news of the defeat of their legendary cavalry, the waiting Mamluk armies in Cairo dispersed to Syria. Bonaparte entered the conquered capital of Egypt on 24 July. On 11 August French forces caught up with Ibrahim Bey and inflicted a crushing defeat at Salalieh. After the Battle of the Pyramids, Napoleon instituted French administration in Cairo and suppressed subsequent rebellions with force. Although he tried to co-opt the local ulama, scholars such as Al-Jabarti poured scorn on the cultural claims of the French. Despite official proclamations of goodwill, and instances of French soldiers converting to Islam to marry locally, clerics like Abdullah al-Sharqawi, who headed Napoleon’s Cairo divan, later described the occupiers as “materialist, libertine philosophers … [who] deny the resurrection, and the afterlife, and … [the] prophets.” For their part, French officials such as mathematician Joseph Fourier lamented that “the Muslim religion would on no account permit the development of the mind.” The Battle of the Pyramids signalled the beginning of the end of seven centuries of Mamluk dominance in Egypt. Yet its strategic effect was short-lived: ten days later Admiral Horatio Nelson destroyed the French fleet at the Battle of the Nile, cutting Napoleon’s army off from France and curtailing his ambitions in the region.

== In literature and the arts ==
The battle has been a frequent subject in art. It was depicted by François-André Vincent in a preparatory sketch and painting, and later by artists including Antoine-Jean Gros, Carle Vernet, and François-Louis-Joseph Watteau.

In popular culture, the battle appears in Ridley Scott’s 2023 historical drama Napoleon. The film’s depiction has been criticised for historical inaccuracies, such as showing French troops firing on the pyramids.

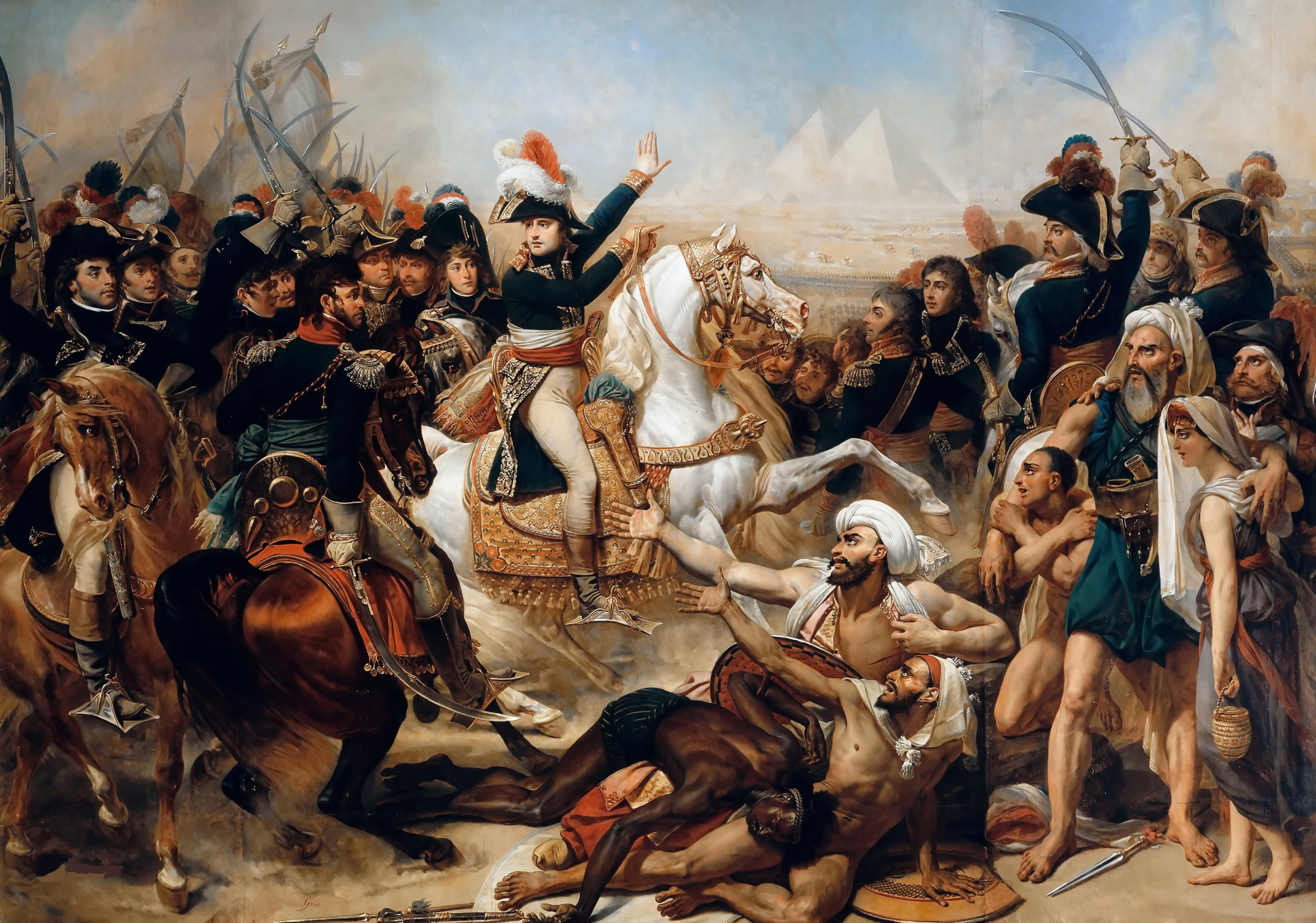
The Battle of the Pyramids by Antoine-Jean Gros

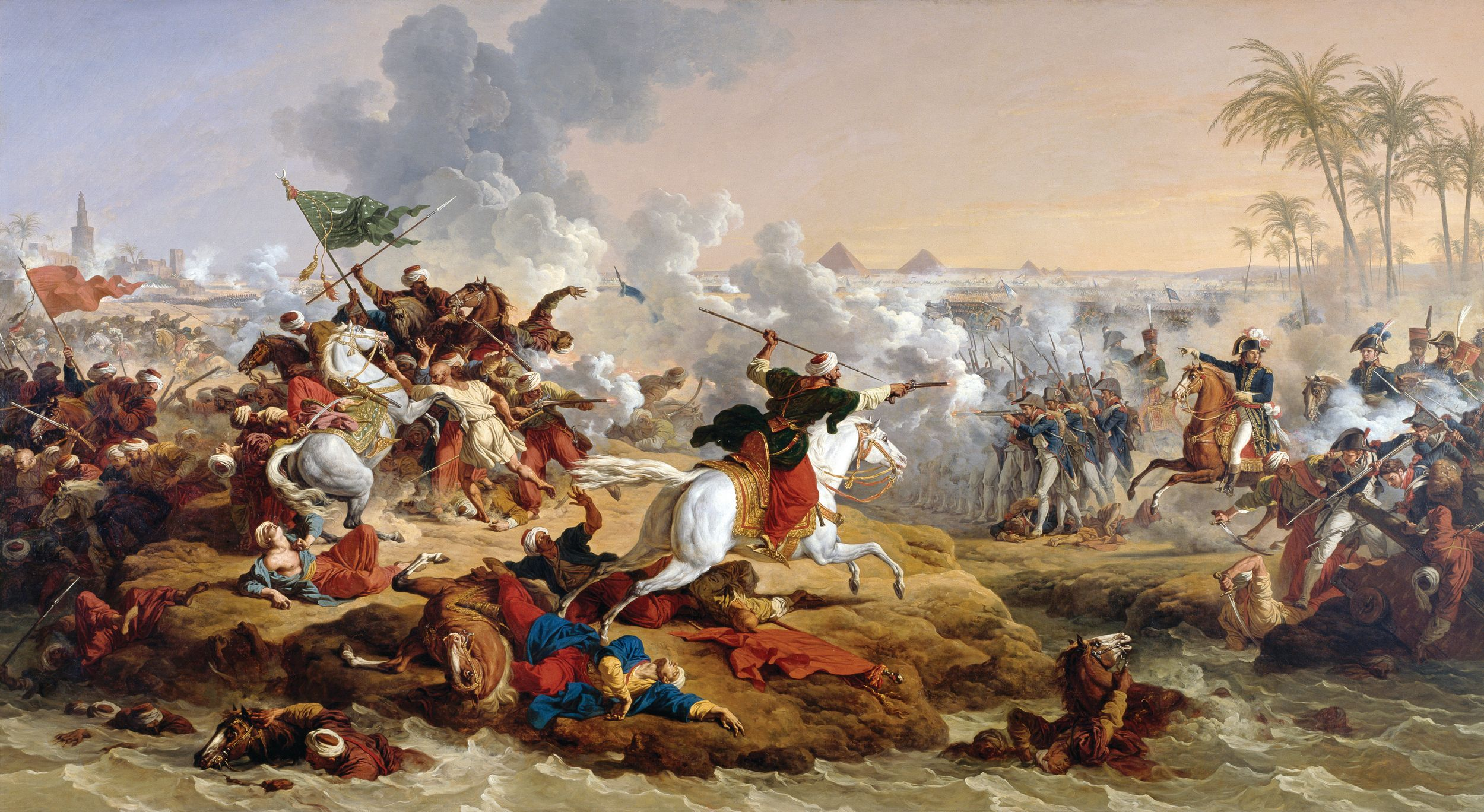
François-André Vincent

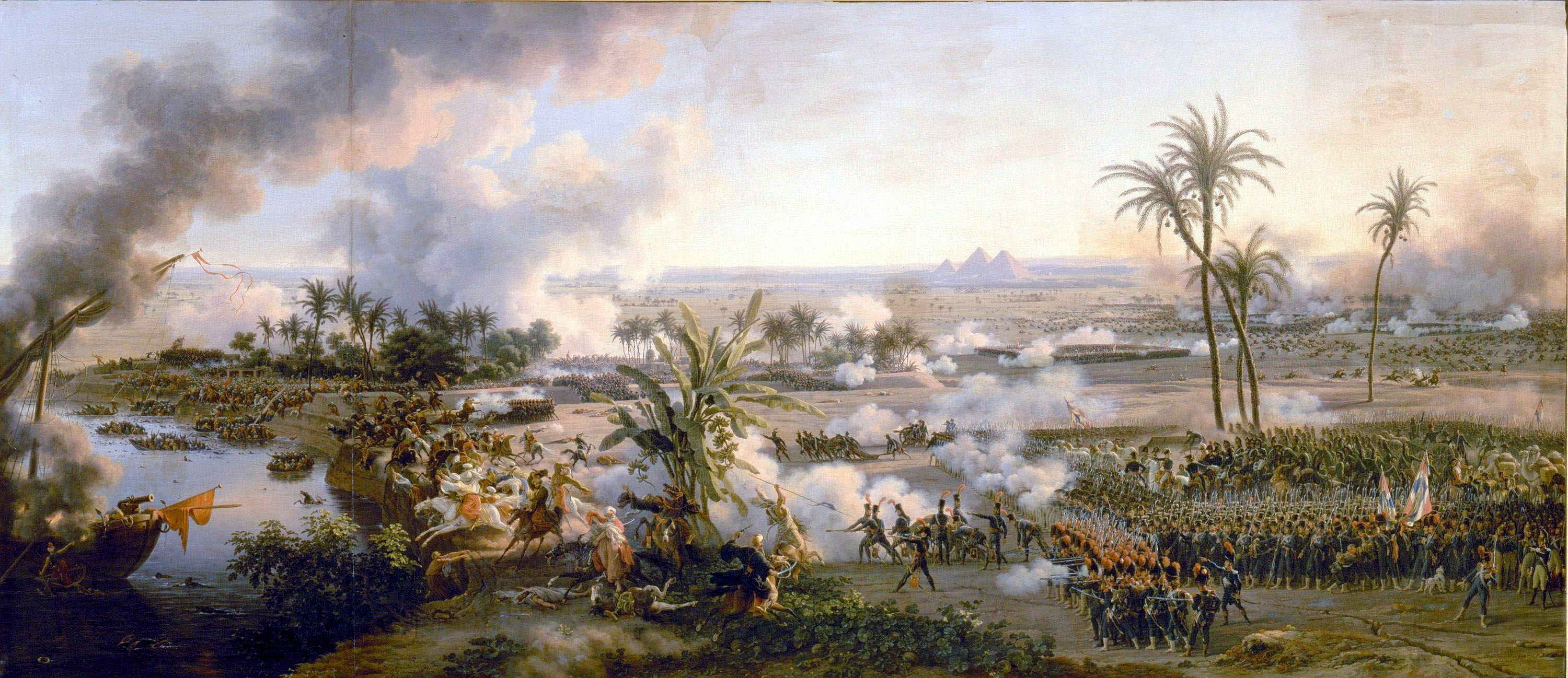
Louis-François Lejeune

== See also ==
- Military career of Napoleon Bonaparte

== Sources ==
- Armoush, Muhammad (2018). Modern contemplations of the French campaign.
- "Battle of the Pyramids, July 21, 1798". metmuseum.org. 1800.
- Bellaigue, Christopher De (2017). The Islamic Enlightenment: The Modern Struggle Between Faith and Reason. Vintage. ISBN 978-1-84792-241-0.
- Berna, Cristina; Thomsen, Eric (20 August 2024). Napoleon Military Campaigns In Art. BOD GmbH DE. ISBN 978-84-1174-792-9.
- Chandler, D.G. (2009). The Campaigns of Napoleon. Scribner. ISBN 978-1-4391-3103-9.
- Clodfelter, Micheal (24 April 2017). Warfare and Armed Conflicts: A Statistical Encyclopedia of Casualty and Other Figures, 1492-2015, 4th ed. McFarland. ISBN 978-1-4766-2585-0.
- Cole, Juan (7 August 2007). Napoleon's Egypt: Invading the Middle East. Macmillan + ORM. ISBN 978-0-230-60741-5.
- Holbrook, Donald (15 January 2018). Al-Qaeda 2.0: A Critical Reader. Oxford University Press. ISBN 978-0-19-091149-2.
- Kotb, Muhammed (3 December 2023). "Napoleon Did Not Shoot the Pyramids As Ridley Scott Might Have You Believe". Egyptian Streets.
- Niox, G.L. (1887). Géographie militaire (in French). Dumaine.
- Roberts, A. (2015). Napoleon: A Life. Penguin Publishing Group. ISBN 978-0-14-312785-7.
- Russell, Quentin (1 April 2022). Mediterranean Naval Battles That Changed the World. Pen and Sword Maritime. ISBN 978-1-5267-1601-9.
- Strathern, P. (2008). Napoleon in Egypt: 'the Greatest Glory'. Vintage. ISBN 978-1-84413-917-0.
