= Honoré Vial =

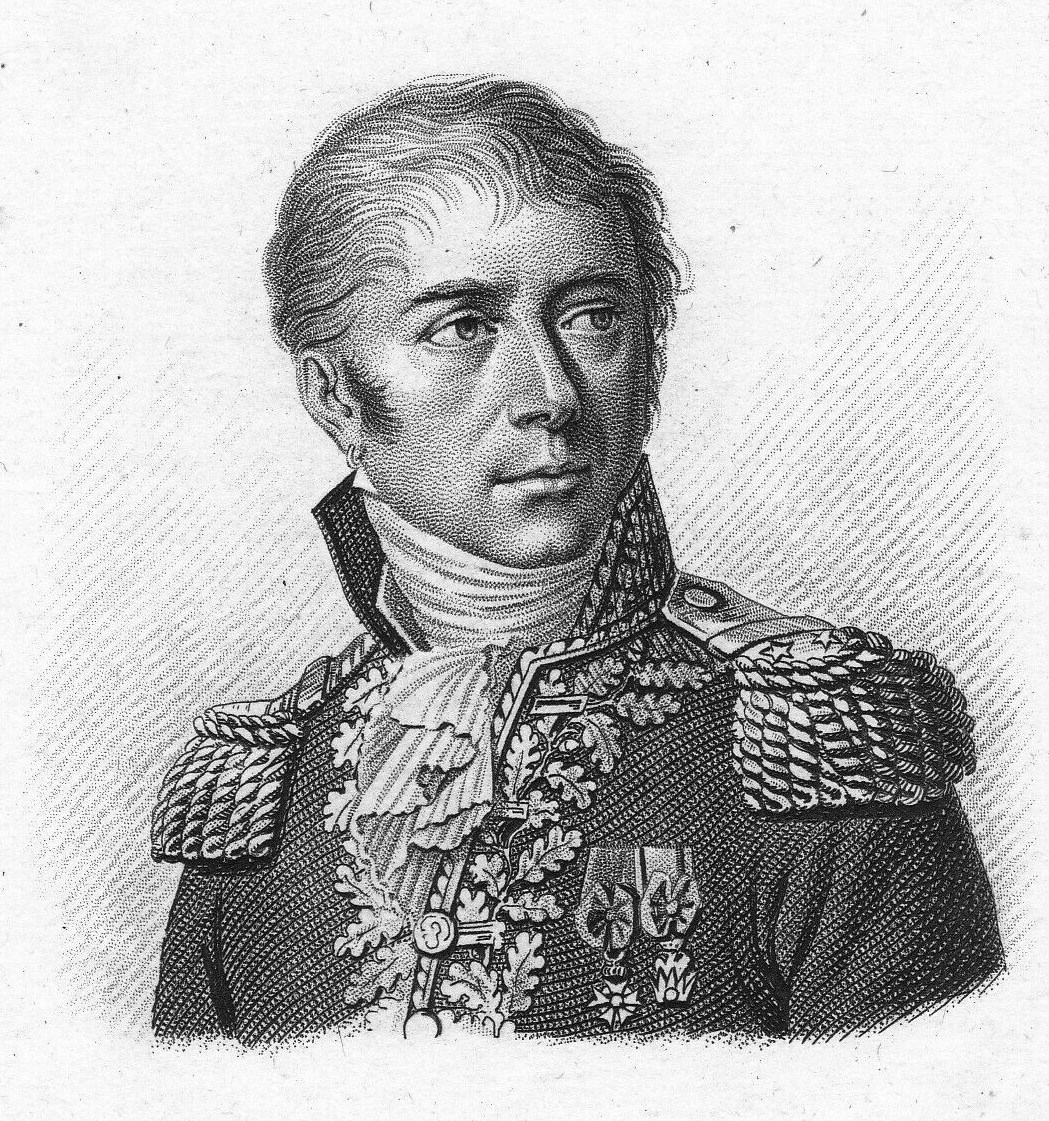
- Born: 22 February 1766; Antibes
- Died: 18 October 1813 (aged 47); Killed at the Battle of Leipzig
- Military career
- Allegiance: Kingdom of France; Kingdom of France; French Republic; French Empire
- Service years: 1788–1813
- Awards: Legion of Honor

Honoré Vial (French pronunciation: [ɔnɔʁe vjal]; 22 February 1766 – 18 October 1813) was a French military leader, diplomat, and administrator who served in the French Revolutionary Wars and Napoleonic Wars.

== Early life and Revolutionary Wars ==
He was born in Antibes and joined the navy in 1788 at the age of 22. In 1794 he was present at the Siege of Bastia as a lieutenant in the infantry and later served as an aide-de-camp to Jean Pierre Maurice de Rochon. In the summer of 1792 he also served as aide to Antoine Guillaume Delmas in the Army of the North (France), distinguishing himself during the Flanders Campaign during the War of the First Coalition. He briefly served as a captain in the cavalry.

In 1794 he was promoted to chef de brigade, the equivalent of a colonel, and transferred to the Army of the Alps before later joining the general staff of the Army of Italy. He was promoted to brigadier general in 1796 and would command brigades of light infantry throughout most of the Italian campaigns of the French Revolutionary Wars under Napoleon Bonaparte. He commanded units during key battles at Arcole and Rivoli.

In 1798 Vial was part of the Armée d'Orient sent on expedition to Egypt and Syria, commanding a brigade in the division of Jacques-François Menou. After Menou was wounded taking Alexandria, Vial replaced him as division commander, leading it at the Battle of the Pyramids. He acted as provincial administrator of Damietta and Mansoura before joining the ultimately unsuccessful Siege of Acre (1799) and seeing action at Mount Tabor. He returned to France in December 1800.

== Napoleonic Wars ==
From 1802 to 1809 Vial served in a diplomatic capacity, first as an envoy to the Kingdom of Naples and later as ambassador to Switzerland. He would return to civil administrative duties in 1809, acting as Governor of Venice after that city's absorption into Napoleon's Kingdom of Italy. In the meantime, he was inducted into the Legion of Honour in 1803, holding the degree of commander, and named a Baron of the Empire in 1810.

After Napoleon suffered a decisive defeat in his 1812 invasion of Russia, Vial once again held military command during the War of the Sixth Coalition the following year. He led the 6th Division as part of the II Corps under Marshal Claude Victor-Perrin. He was present at the Battle of Dresden in August, where Napoleon won a victory against Coalition forces despite being heavily outnumbered.

== Death ==
Vial was killed in action in October 1813 at the Battle of Leipzig.
