= Franz Joseph, Marquis de Lusignan =

Austrian general (1753–1832)

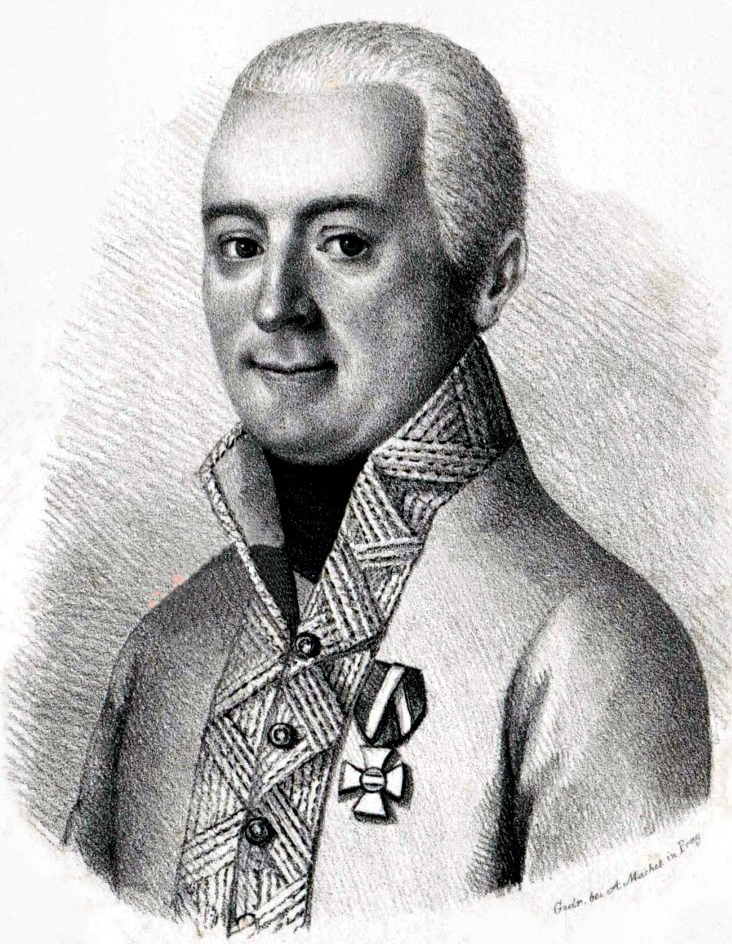
- Born: 23 June 1753; Jaca, Spain
- Died: 23 December 1832 (aged 79) Ivanovice na Hané, Austrian Empire
- Allegiance: Habsburg monarchy Austrian Empire
- Branch: Infantry
- Service years: 1771-1809
- Rank: Feldzeugmeister
- Conflicts: War of the Bavarian Succession; Brabant Revolution; French Revolutionary Wars; Napoleonic Wars
- Awards: Military Order of Maria Theresa
- Other work: Inhaber, Infantry Regiment # 16

Franz Joseph, Marquis de Lusignan (23 June 1753 – 23 December 1832), a Spaniard, joined the Habsburg army and fought against Prussian soldiers and Belgian rebels. During the French Revolutionary Wars, he played a significant role at the Battle of Rivoli in 1797 and became a general officer. He led brigade- and division-sized forces during the Italian campaign of 1799. In the Napoleonic Wars, he twice commanded a division and was so badly wounded in 1809 that he was forced to retire from the army. From 1806 until his death he was proprietor of the Lusignan Infantry Regiment.

== Early career ==
Lusignan was born into an old Spanish family on 23 June 1753 at Jaca in modern-day Spain. In 1771, he entered the Habsburg service as a Fähnrich (ensign) in the Ferraris Infantry Regiment # 14. He fought with a Freikorps during the War of the Bavarian Succession. He became a Major in 1789, when he was stationed in the Austrian Netherlands. The following year he distinguished himself in action near Liège, overthrowing a large body of Belgian rebels with a small force. He received the Knight's Cross of the Military Order of Maria Theresa for his efforts.

While an Oberstleutnant, Lusignan commanded 800 infantry and 100 cavalry during two days fighting near Virton, a town in modern-day Belgium near the border of France. Under his leadership were four companies of the Bender Infantry Regiment # 41, four companies of the Le Loup Jägers, and one squadron of the Esterhazy Hussar Regiment # 32. On 22 October, his force was attacked at Latour village by Jean-Baptiste Cyrus de Valence's Advance Guard of the Army of the Ardennes, altogether 3,500 French infantry, 1,500 cavalry, and six field pieces. His troops suffered a minor defeat, and the battle continued at Virton the next day. On 23 October, his outnumbered troops were defeated again with the loss of 43 men and 11 horses. He fought at the Battle of Jemappes in November 1792. A month later, the French captured him and held him until he was exchanged. In 1794, he became Oberst (colonel) and assumed command of the Klebek Infantry Regiment # 14. In 1795, he fought on the Upper Rhine River under the command of Dagobert von Wurmser and captured a redoubt during the Battle of Mainz in 1795. He commanded one of two advance guards in the corps of Peter Quasdanovich during the actions leading up to the Battle of Lonato in August 1796.

== Rivoli ==
In January 1797, Jozsef Alvinczi assigned Lusignan command of the 1st Column during the fourth attempt to relieve the Siege of Mantua. His commander ordered him to take four battalions and 12 companies of light infantry, totalling 4,556 men, on the army's extreme right flank. "Lusignan was faced with the almost Herculean task of leading his men along the top of the chain of mountain peaks (collectively known as Monte Baldo) that separates the Adige from the northern arm of Lake Garda, and runs parallel with them. In the winter, it was a featureless wasteland of snow and ice, the highest point of which lay ten miles north of Rivoli, and rose to the not inconsiderable height of 7,279 feet."

Monte Baldo in summer

Not surprisingly, Lusignan's march fell behind schedule in the next few days. However, he persevered under the extraordinary conditions and reached his assigned position. During the Battle of Rivoli, Alvinczi instructed him to make another flank march, this time to a position in rear of Napoleon Bonaparte's French army. He carried out his orders, but found himself isolated on a hill far from the action. By the afternoon of 14 January, Bonaparte defeated the other Austrian columns. Attacked from the north by André Masséna's troops and blocked from the south by a division under Gabriel Venance Rey, Lusignan tried to break out to the west. His soldiers were captured by the hundreds as they collapsed from their recent exertions. Historian David G. Chandler states that 3,000 men from the 1st Column were taken prisoner. However, Lusignan escaped capture.

On 28 February 1797, Lusignan became a General-Major. While commanding the rearguard two weeks later, he was captured during Archduke Charles's retreat from northeast Italy.

He served in Italy during the War of the Second Coalition. On 5 April 1799, he led a brigade in Michael Frölich's division at the Battle of Magnano, where he was wounded three times. At times during 1799, he served as acting commander of the division. He led a division in action at Marengo on 16 May 1799, He commanded a brigade under Michael von Melas at the Battle of Novi on 15 August. Emperor Francis II promoted him Feldmarschallleutnant on 30 January 1801.

== Napoleonic Wars ==
In 1805, Lusignan took command of a division in the Tyrol. In 1806 he became Proprietor (Inhaber) of Lusignan Infantry Regiment # 16, a position which he held until his death. The War of the Fifth Coalition found him in command of a division in the III Armeekorps under the command of Prince Friedrich of Hohenzollern-Hechingen. While leading his troops at the Battle of Teugen-Hausen on 19 April 1809, he was wounded in the head. Though forced into retirement by his injury, a grateful emperor elevated him to the rank of Feldzeugmeister on 29 May. He died on 23 December 1832 at Ivanovice na Hané in the modern-day Czech Republic.
