= Barthélemy Catherine Joubert =

French general (1769–1799)

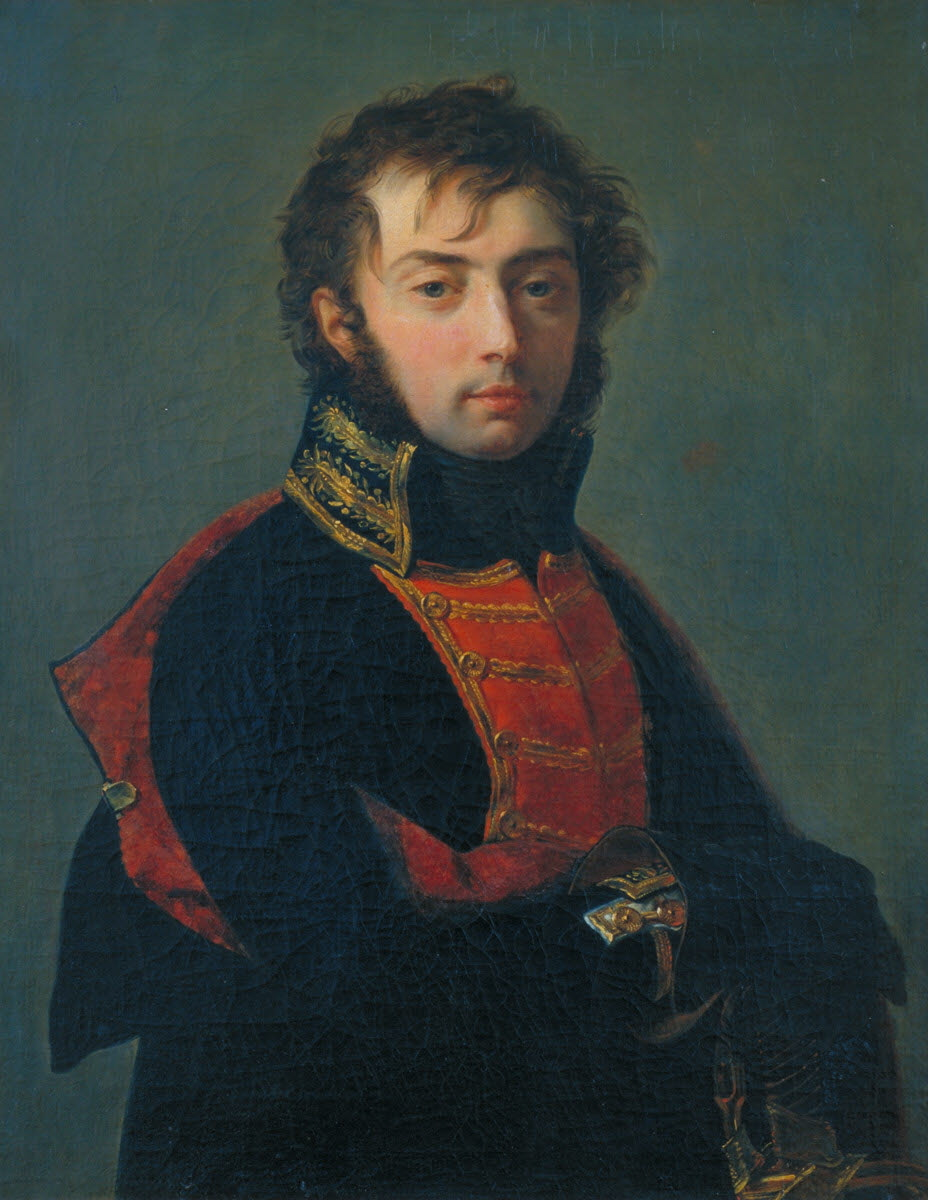
- Presumed portrait of general Joubert by Antoine-Jean Gros, c. 1799
- Born: 14 April 1769; Pont-de-Vaux (Ain), France
- Died: 15 August 1799 (aged 30); Novi, Italy
- Military career
- Allegiance: Kingdom of France; French First Republic
- Service years: 1791 – 1799
- Rank: Général de Division
- Conflicts: French Revolutionary Wars; Battle of Monte Settepani; Battle of Loano; Battle of Lodi; Battle of Castiglione; Battle of Rivoli; Tyrolean expedition (1797); Battle of Genola; Battle of Novi †
- Awards: Three days of national mourning in 1799

Barthélemy Catherine Joubert (English: /ʒuːˈbɛər/ zhoo-BAIR, French: [baʁtelemi katʁin ʒubɛʁ]; 14 April 1769 – 15 August 1799) was a French general who served during the French Revolutionary Wars. Recognizing his talents, Napoleon Bonaparte gave him increased responsibilities. Joubert was killed while commanding the French army at the Battle of Novi in 1799.

== Early life and career ==
The son of an advocate, Joubert was born at Pont-de-Vaux (Ain), and ran away from school in 1784 to enlist in the artillery. He was brought back and sent to study law at Lyon and Dijon. In 1791, during the French Revolutionary Wars, he joined the French Revolutionary Army regiment of the Ain, and was elected by his comrades successively as corporal and sergeant. In January 1792 he was promoted to sous-lieutenant, and in November became a lieutenant, having in the meantime participated in his first campaign with the army of Italy.

In 1793, Joubert distinguished himself during the defence of a redoubt at the Col de Tende in north-west Italy, where he led only thirty men against a battalion of the enemy. After being wounded and captured in the battle, he was released on parole by Austrian Commander-in-Chief Joseph Nikolaus de Vins. In 1794 he was again actively engaged, and received a promotion to brigadier general on 24 December 1795.

== 1796–97 ==
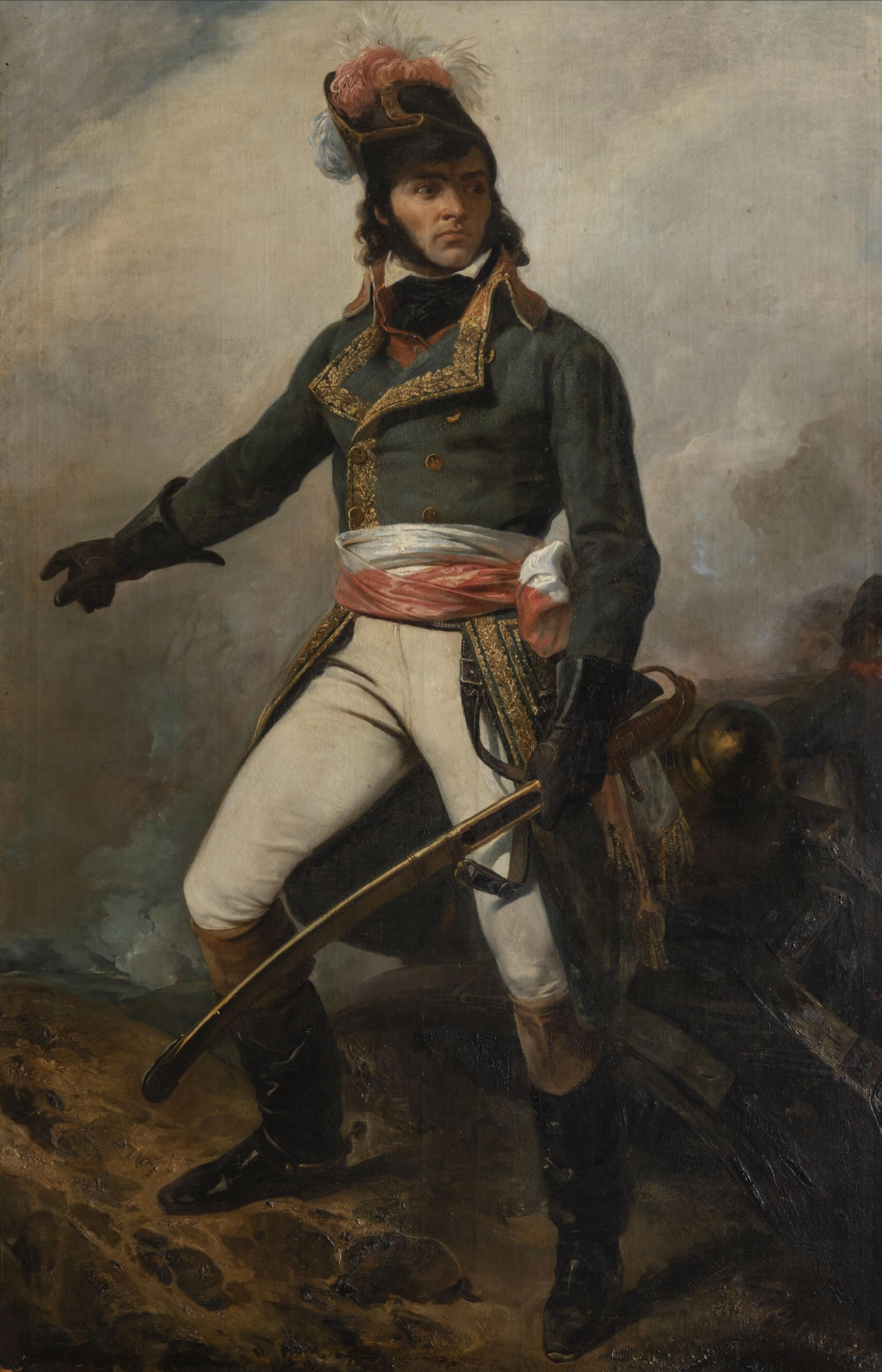
Barthélemy Catherine Joubert

In the campaign of 1796, Joubert became part of Napoleon Bonaparte's overall command. He led a brigade under Pierre Augereau in the Battle of Millesimo and under André Masséna at the Battle of Lodi. He also participated in the Battle of Castiglione in August. Joubert quickly attracted the special attention of Napoleon Bonaparte, who promoted him to general of a division in December 1796.

Bonaparte repeatedly selected him for the command of important detachments, including the holding force in the Adige River valley at the Battle of Rivoli. During the spring campaign of 1797 (invasion of Austria) he commanded the detached left wing of Bonaparte's army in the Tyrol. He distinguished himself by fighting his way through the mountains to rejoin his chief in Styria. In February 1797, General Joubert intervened against Tyrolean companies of sharpshooters, issuing an angry message to crush their resistance: "I declare that I consider as enemies of the French, all the fathers, whose children are enrolled in the Tyrolean companies of sharpshooters, will be imprisoned and their property confiscated for the benefit of the Republic."

== 1798–99 ==
He subsequently held various commands in the Low Countries, on the Rhine and in the Italian Peninsula, where he served as commander in chief up to January 1799. On 6 December 1798, he occupied the Piedmontese capital of Turin. Resigning the post due to a dispute with the civil authorities, Joubert returned to France. There, he married (in June 1799) Mlle de Montholon, who was the daughter of Charles-Louis Huguet de Sémonville, and the future wife of Marshal Jacques Macdonald.

Joubert was soon summoned to the field to counter a series of major French defeats in northern Italy. He took over command from Jean Moreau in mid-July 1799, who remained as his advisor.

Joubert and Moreau were quickly compelled to give battle by Aleksandr Suvorov, at the head of a joint Russian and Austrian army. The ensuing Battle of Novi was disastrous for the French, not only because it was a defeat, but also because Joubert was among the first to fall, shot through the heart by an infanterist of the Ogulinska 3rd Infantry Regiment. Joubert had at one time been marked out as a future great captain by Napoleon, but became just another killed French military commander before the Napoleonic Wars.

After the battle, his remains were brought to Toulon and buried in the Fort La Malgue. The French Directory paid tribute to him with a ceremony on the 16 September 1799. A monument to Joubert erected at Bourg-en-Bresse was later razed by order of Louis XVIII. Another monument stands in the town of his birth at Pont de Vaux.

== Sources ==
- In turn, it cites as references:
  - Chevrier, Le Général Joubert d'après sa correspondence (2nd ed. 1884).
  - Guilbert, Notice sur la vie de B. C. Joubert
- Chandler, David. Dictionary of the Napoleonic Wars. New York: Macmillan, 1979. ISBN 0-02-523670-9
- Chandler, David. The Campaigns of Napoleon. New York: Macmillan, 1966.
- Paul Kussan (2010) [Originally published in 1852 as Kurzgefasste Geschichte des Oguliner dritten National-Grenz-Infanterie-Regiments]. Sanja Lazanin; Drago Roksandić (eds.). Kratka povijest Treće ogulinske narodne graničarske pješadijske regimente : prema sabranim spisima i poveljama Paula Kussana, upravnog kapetana (in Croatian). Translated by Sonja Perković. Srpsko kulturno društvo "Prosvjeta". ISBN 9789537611224. OCLC 778635294.

Military offices
| Preceded by Joseph Gilot | Military governor of Paris; 1799 | Succeeded by Jean-Antoine Marbot |
