= Battle of Verona (1799) =

1799 Battle during the War of the Second Coalition

- Part of the French Revolutionary War
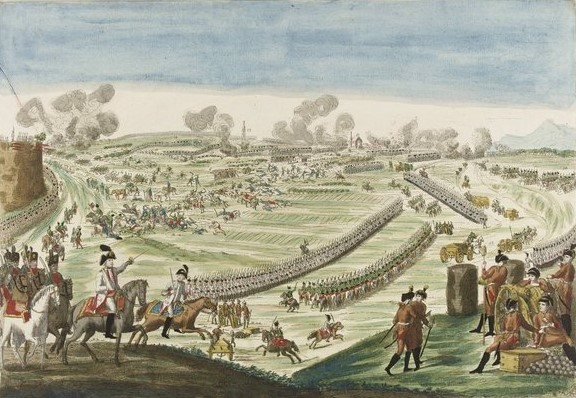
- Battle of 26 March 1799 under the walls of Verona by Luigi Frisoni
Date	26 March 1799
Location	near Verona, Italy 45°26′19″N 10°59′34″E
Result	Inconclusive

Belligerents
France	(Habsburg monarchy) Austria

Commanders and leaders
(France) Barthélemy Schérer (France) Jean-Mathieu-Philibert Sérurier	(Habsburg monarchy) Pál Kray

Strength
46,400	41,400

Casualties and losses
5,228; 17 guns	7,000–8,000; 8 guns

War of the Second Coalition:
Italy
current battle
Napoleon in command
Napoleon not in command

The Battle of Verona on 26 March 1799 saw a Habsburg Austrian army under Pál Kray fight a French First Republic army led by Barthélemy Louis Joseph Schérer. The battle encompassed three separate combats on the same day: at Verona, the two sides battled to a bloody draw; at Pastrengo to the west of Verona, French forces prevailed over their Austrian opponents; at Legnago to the southeast of Verona, the Austrians defeated their French adversaries. The battle was fought during the War of the Second Coalition, part of the French Revolutionary Wars. Verona is a city on the Adige River in northern Italy.

== Result ==
At Pastrengo, the French lost 1,000 killed, wounded, and missing out of 22,400 soldiers while inflicting 2,000 killed and wounded on the 11,000 Austrians. In addition, the French captured 1,500 men, 12 guns, two pontoon bridges, and two colors. The Schröder Infantry Regiment Nr. 27 lost particularly serious casualties. At Verona, French losses numbered 1,500 killed and wounded plus 300 men and three guns captured out of a total of 14,500 men. The Austrians counted 1,600 killed and wounded and 1,100 captured out of 16,400 troops. Generals Konrad Valentin von Kaim, Ferdinand Minkwitz, and Anton Lipthay de Kisfalud were wounded. The contest at Legnago cost the French 2,000 killed and wounded and 600 men and 14 guns captured out of 9,500 men. General of Brigade François Felix Vignes was killed. The Austrians lost 700 killed and wounded and 100 captured out of 14,000 soldiers. Lipthay never recovered from his wounds and died on 17 February 1800 at Padua.

== Sources ==
- Acerbi, Enrico. "The 1799 Campaign in Italy: The Left Wing - led directly by General Schérer (deployed with Delmas)".
- Acerbi, Enrico. "The 1799 Campaign in Italy: Austrian defence of Verona - March 24th 1799".
- Acerbi, Enrico. "The 1799 Campaign in Italy: Battle of Verona - March 26, 1799".
- Acerbi, Enrico. "The 1799 Campaign in Italy: Verona Defense March 26, 1799".
- Acerbi, Enrico. "The 1799 Campaign in Italy: Austrian Deployment Approaching the Legnago Battle".
- Clausewitz, Carl von (2020). Napoleon Absent, Coalition Ascendant: The 1799 Campaign in Italy and Switzerland, Volume 1. Trans and ed. Nicholas Murray and Christopher Pringle. Lawrence, Kansas: University Press of Kansas. ISBN 978-0-7006-3025-7
- Smith, Digby (1998). The Napoleonic Wars Data Book. London: Greenhill. ISBN 1-85367-276-9.
- Smith, Digby; Kudrna, Leopold. "Biographical Dictionary of All Austrian Generals during the French Revolutionary and Napoleonic Wars: 1792-1815". The Napoleon Series. Archived from the original on 4 March 2016.
