= Battle of Castiglione order of battle =

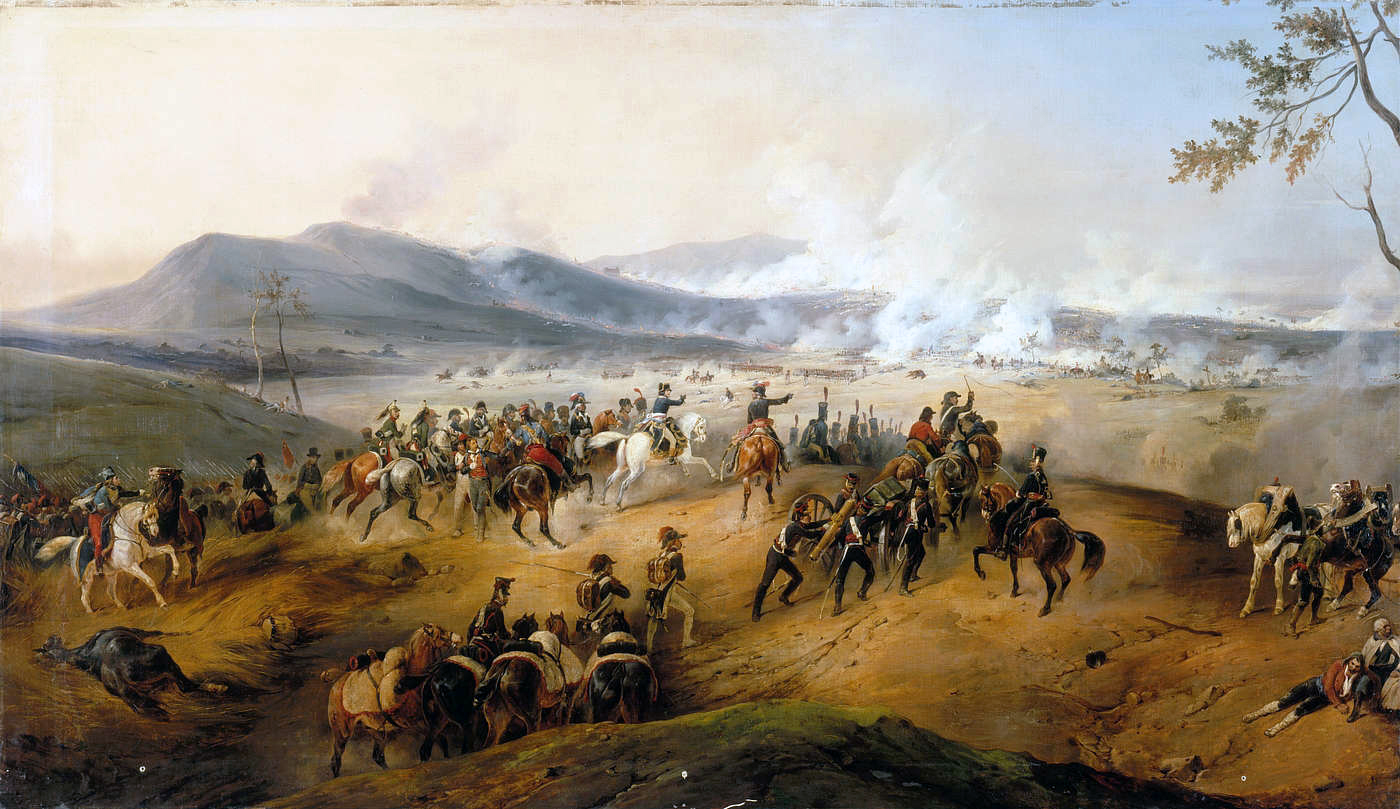
Battle of Castiglione by Victor Adam (1836)

In the Battle of Castiglione on 5 August 1796, the French Army of Italy under the command of General Napoleon Bonaparte defeated an Austrian army led by Field Marshal Dagobert Sigmund von Wurmser. Castiglione and the Battle of Lonato were the major actions in a campaign which marked the first attempted relief of the Siege of Mantua. While Wurmser advanced east of Lake Garda with three columns, Peter Quasdanovich moved his column into the area west of Lake Garda. The Austrians pushed back the French forces and forced Bonaparte to raise the siege. However, the French commander massed against Quasdanovich and forced him to retreat after a week of see-saw fighting. After disposing of Quasdanovich, Bonaparte turned on Wurmser and defeated the main army also. In the sequel, the French pushed the Mantua garrison back and blockaded the city.

== French Army ==
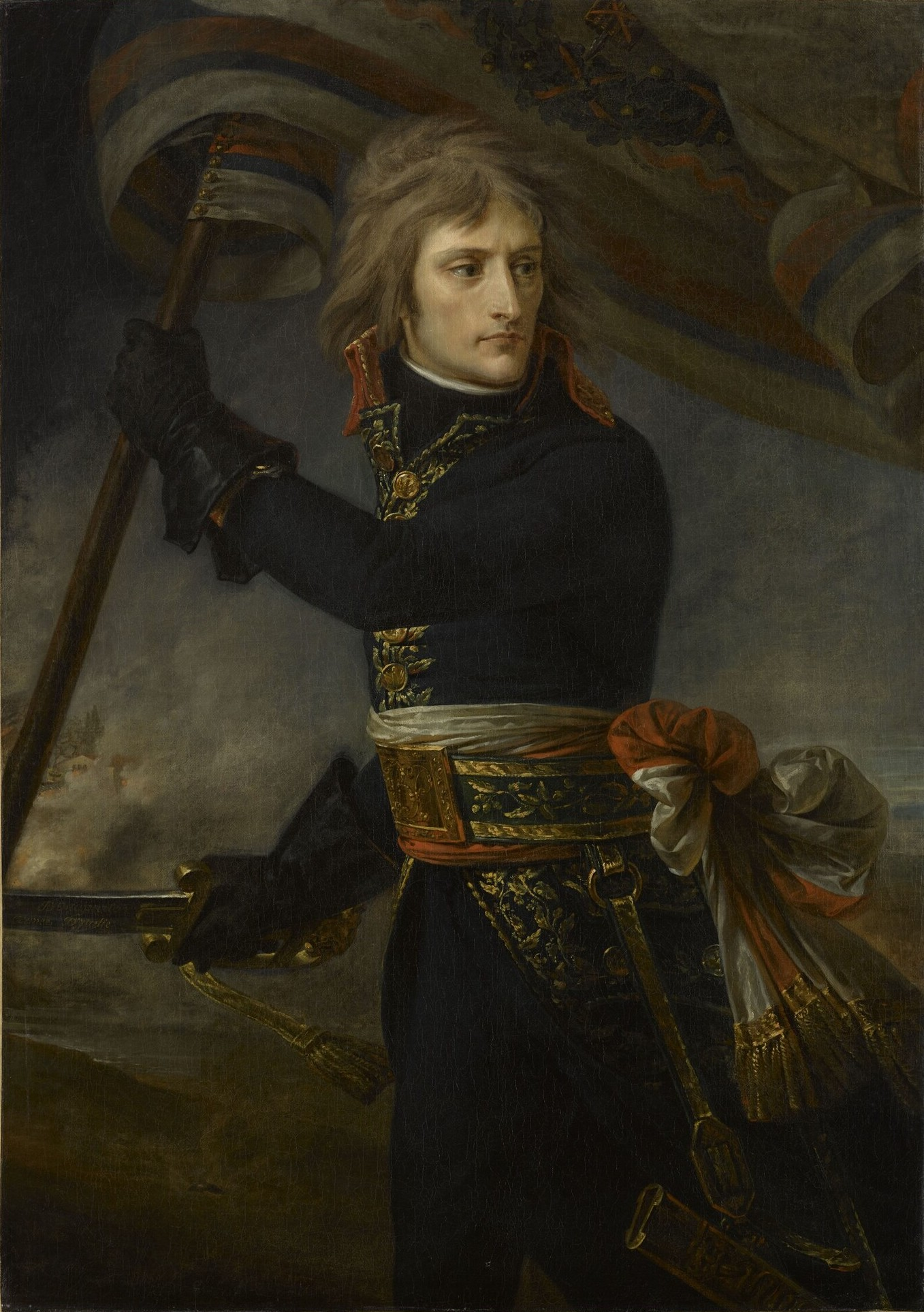
Napoleon Bonaparte

- Army of Italy: Napoleon Bonaparte (42,049)
  - Division: General of Division André Masséna (15,391)
    - Brigade: General of Brigade Barthélemy Catherine Joubert
    - Brigade: General of Brigade Antoine La Valette
    - Brigade: General of Brigade Antoine-Guillaume Rampon
    - Brigade: General of Brigade Claude Perrin Victor
    - Brigade: General of Brigade Jean Joseph Magdeleine Pijon
    - Brigade: General of Brigade Paul Guillaume
  - Division: General of Division Pierre Augereau (5,368)
    - Brigade: General of Brigade Martial Beyrand †
    - Brigade: General of Brigade Jean Gilles André Robert
    - Brigade: General of Brigade Gaspard Amédée Gardanne
  - Division: General of Division Pierre Francois Sauret (4,462)
    - Brigade: General of Brigade Jean Joseph Guieu
    - Brigade: General of Brigade Jean-Baptiste Dominique Rusca
  - Division: General of Division Jean-Mathieu-Philibert Sérurier vice Pascal Antoine Fiorella (10,521)
    - Brigade: General of Brigade Louis Pelletier
    - Brigade: General of Brigade Charles François Charton
    - Brigade: General of Brigade Emmanuel Gervais de Roergaz de Serviez
    - Brigade: General of Brigade Claude Dallemagne
  - Division: General of Division Hyacinthe Francois Joseph Despinoy (4,772)
    - Brigade: General of Brigade Nicolas Bertin
    - Brigade: General of Brigade Jean-Baptiste Cervoni
  - Cavalry: General of Division Charles Edward Jennings de Kilmaine (1,535)
    - Brigade: General of Brigade Marc Antoine de Beaumont

== Austrian Army ==
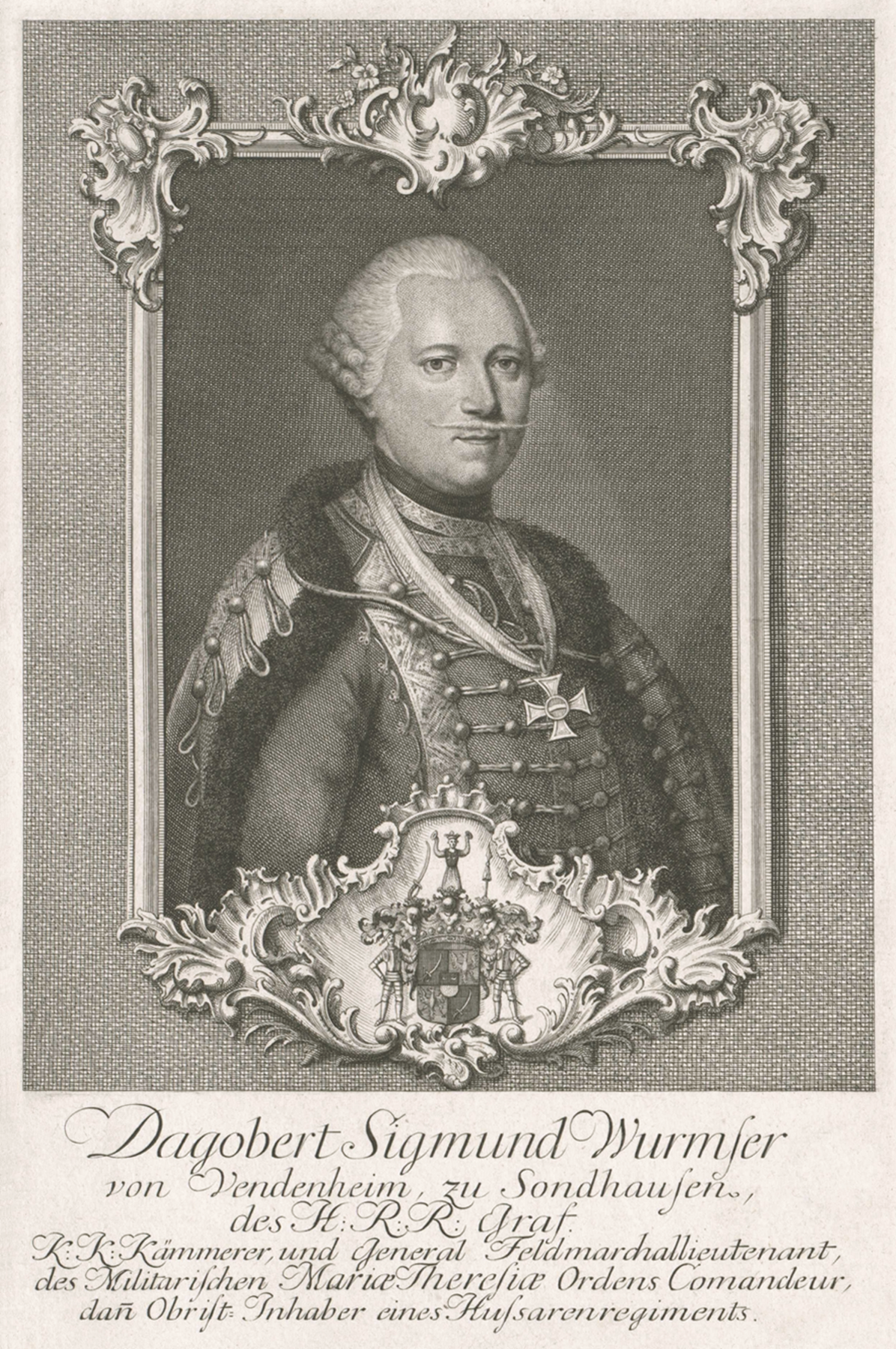
Dagobert von Wurmser

- Austrian Army: Feldmarschall Dagobert von Wurmser (60,690, 98 position and 94 battalion guns)
  - Right (I) Column: Feldmarschall-Leutnant Peter Vitus von Quosdanovich (17,621)
    - Brigade: General-major Prince Heinrich XV of Reuss-Plauen
    - Brigade: General-major Johann Rudolf von Sporck
    - Brigade: General-major Peter Karl Ott von Bátorkéz
    - Brigade: General-major Joseph Ocskay von Ocsko
    - 17 battalions (15,272), 13 squadrons (2,349), 24 position guns
  - Right-Center (II) Column: Feldmarschall-Leutnant Michael von Melas (14,403)
    - Brigade: General-major Peter Gummer
    - Brigade: General-major Adam Bajalics von Bajahaza
    - Division: Feldmarschallleutnant Karl Philipp Sebottendorf
      - Brigade: General-major Franz Nicoletti
      - Brigade: General-major Philipp Pittoni von Dannenfeld
    - 19 battalions (13,676), 4 squadrons (727), 24 position guns
  - Left-Center (III) Column: Feldmarschall-Leutnant Paul Davidovich (9,892)
    - Brigade: General-major Anton Ferdinand Mittrowsky
    - Brigade: General-major Anton Lipthay de Kisfalud
    - Brigade: General-major Leberecht Spiegel
    - 11 battalions (8,274), 10 squadrons (1,618), 40 position guns
  - Left (IV) Column: Feldmarschall-Leutnant Johann Mészáros von Szoboszló (5,021)
    - Brigade: General-major Prince Friedrich Franz Xaver of Hohenzollern-Hechingen
    - Brigade: General-major Ferdinand Minckwitz
    - 5 battalions (3,949), 7 squadrons (1,072), 10 position guns
  - Mantua Garrison: Feldmarschall-Leutnant Joseph Canto d'Irles (13,753)
    - Brigade: General-major Gerhard Rosselmini (3,666 in 5 battalions)
    - Brigade: General-major Josef Philipp Vukassovich (2,449 in 3 battalions)
    - Brigade: Oberst Karl Salisch (1,489 in 6 battalions)
    - Brigade: General-major Mathias Rukavina von Boynograd (2,443 in 5 battalions)
    - Brigade: Oberst Strurioni (2,298 in 2½ bns)
    - Unattached: 434 cavalry in 3½ squadrons, 96 sappers, 701 artillerists

== See also ==
- List of French generals of the Revolutionary and Napoleonic Wars
