= Battle of Lonato =

1796 battle during the War of the First Coalition

- Part of the Italian campaign of 1796–1797 in the War of the First Coalition
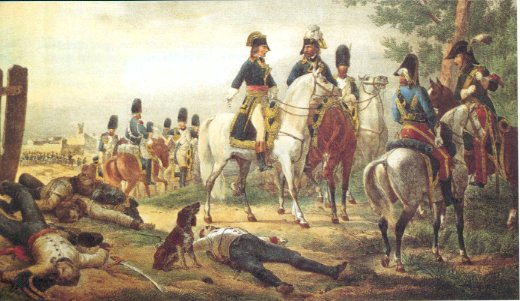
- General Bonaparte at the Battle of Lonato
Date	3–4 August 1796
Location	Lonato del Garda, present-day Italy 45°27′40″N 10°29′04″E
Result	French victory

Belligerents
France	Austria

Commanders and leaders
(France) Napoleon Bonaparte (France) André Masséna	(Habsburg monarchy) Peter Quasdanovich (Habsburg monarchy) Dagobert von Wurmser

Strength
20,000	15,000

Casualties and losses
2,000 casualties	5,000 casualties 23 guns
- Location within Alps Battle of Lonato (Europe)

War of the First Coalition:
Italian Campaign
current battle
Napoleon as subordinate
Napoleon in command

The Battle of Lonato was fought on 3 and 4 August 1796 between the French Army of Italy under General Napoleon Bonaparte and a corps-sized Austrian column led by Lieutenant General Peter Quasdanovich. A week of hard-fought actions that began on 29 July and ended on 4 August resulted in the retreat of Quasdanovich's badly mauled force. The elimination of Quasdanovich's threat allowed Bonaparte to concentrate against and defeat the main Austrian army at the Battle of Castiglione on 5 August. Lonato del Garda is located near the SP 668 highway and the Brescia-Padua section of Autostrada A4 to the southwest of Lake Garda.

On 29 July, the Austrians advanced out of the Alps to capture the towns of Gavardo and Salò on the west side of Lake Garda. The Austrians followed up this success by surprising and seizing the French base at Brescia on 30 July. An Austrian brigade captured Lonato del Garda on the 31st but was ejected from the town by a French counterattack after tough fighting. Also on the 31st, a French division briefly recaptured Salò, rescued a small band of compatriots, and fell back. This series of combats and other battles east of Lake Garda compelled Bonaparte to raise the siege of Mantua.

Leaving only one division to observe the main Austrian army to the east, Bonaparte assembled overwhelming force and recaptured Brescia on 1 August. Quasdanovich regrouped around Gavardo on 2 August, while ordering an attack by several columns for the next day. On 3 August, one of the Austrian columns defeated a French brigade and captured Lonato for the second time. However, the French also attacked that day, capturing Salò and nearly taking Gavardo. With most of the Austrian forces placed on the defensive, Bonaparte massed against the solitary brigade in Lonato and crushed it. This disaster caused Quasdanovich to order a retreat on 4 August. In a final calamity, one withdrawing Austrian column was cut off and captured.

== Background ==
At the end of July an Austrian army set out from Trento intending to relieve the besieged fortress of Mantua. While the main army under Field Marshal Dagobert von Wurmser drove south down the upper Adige River valley to the east of Lake Garda, the Right Column under Quasdanovich struck on the west side of Lake Garda. This 18,000-strong corps consisted of four mixed (cavalry and infantry) brigades led by General-Majors Peter Karl Ott von Bátorkéz, Heinrich XV, Prince of Reuss-Plauen, Joseph Ocskay von Ocsko, and Johann Rudolf von Sporck. The Right Column also included two advanced guards, led by Obersts (colonels) Franz Joseph, Marquis de Lusignan and Johann von Klenau.

Bonaparte did not believe that major Austrian forces were capable of operating in the mountains west of Lake Garda. Consequently, only General of Division Pierre Francois Sauret's 4,500-man division defended the area, with garrisons in Salò on the western shore of the lake, Gavardo on the Chiese River west of Salò, and Desenzano del Garda at the southwestern corner of the lake. The French held Brescia with only three companies of infantry.

== Operations ==
See Castiglione 1796 Campaign Order of Battle for a detailed list of French and Austrian units.

=== West of Lake Garda ===
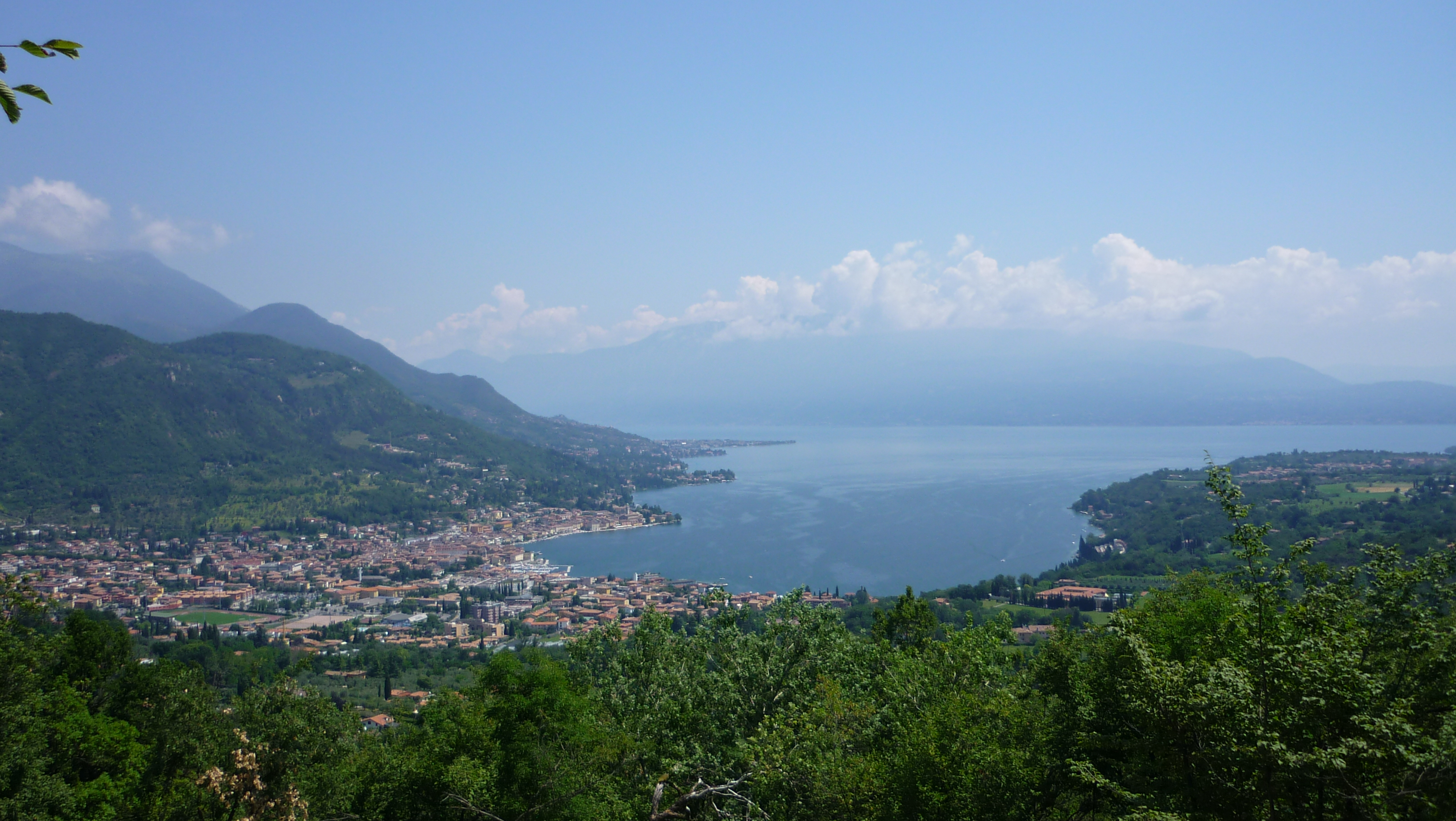
Salò and Lake Garda

On 29 July, Ott's brigade attacked Salò while Ocskay's brigade moved against Gavardo. General of Brigade Jean-Baptiste Dominique Rusca was warned by a village curate of Austrian descent, but chose to disregard the information. Consequently, the Austrians took Sauret's division by surprise. The French general withdrew to Desenzano after a stiff fight in which 500 Frenchmen and two cannons were captured. At Salò, General of Brigade Jean Joseph Guieu and 400 men took refuge in the Palazzo Martinengo, where they were blockaded by Ocskay's soldiers.

Receiving a report that Brescia lay open to attack, Klenau advanced in the night with two squadrons of the Wurmser Hussar Regiment # 30, one battalion of DeVins Infantry Regiment (IR) # 37, and one company of the Mahony Jägers. The next morning, under cover of fog, he seized the city in a coup de main. The Austrians captured 600–700 able-bodied soldiers plus 2,000 more in the hospital. Among the prisoners were Colonels Jean Lannes, Joachim Murat and François Étienne de Kellermann. Quasdanovich soon arrived at Brescia with the brigades of Reuss and Sporck. At the same time, Ott's brigade advanced south from Salò and Gavardo to reach Ponte San Marco, where the Brescia-Verona highway crosses the Chiese just west of Lonato. Ocskay's troops besieged the French soldiers trapped in Salò. That night, Bonaparte determined to give up the siege of Mantua and concentrate his main strength against Quasdanovich while subsidiary forces held Wurmser at bay.

=== "First" Battle of Lonato ===
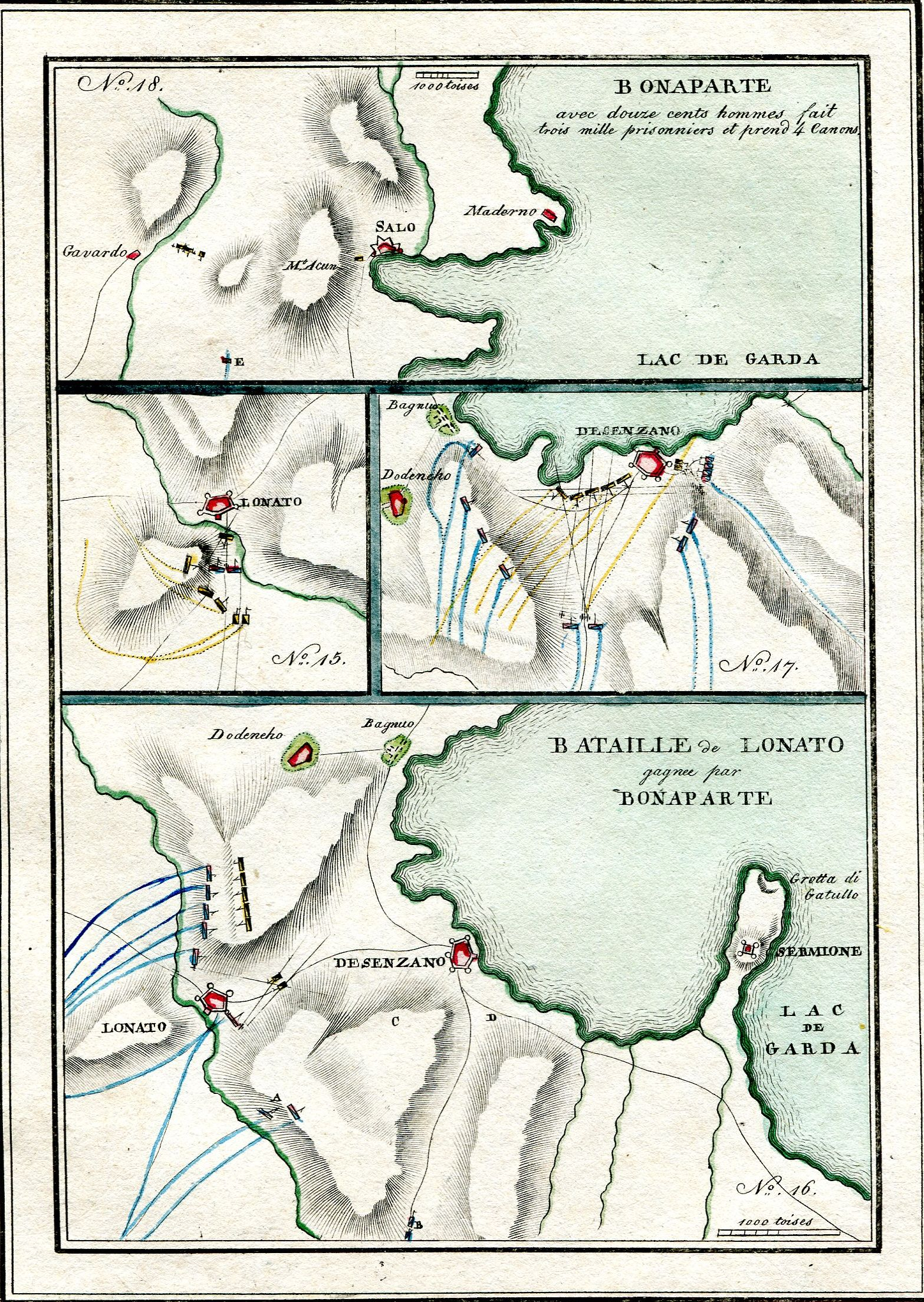
Battle of Lonato won by Bonaparte.

On 31 July, Ott's brigade at San Marco advanced to the east on Lonato. The Austrian general led two battalions of the Kheul Infantry Regiment Nr. 10, four companies of the Johann Jellacic Infantry Regiment Nr. 53, two companies of the Liccaner Grenz Infantry Regiment Nr. 60, and one squadron of the Erdödy Hussar Regiment Nr. 11. The initial attack flushed part of General of Division Hyacinthe Francois Joseph Despinoy's division out of Lonato. As the Hussars chased the fugitives to the east, they were repulsed by two waiting French artillery batteries. General of Division André Masséna with General of Brigade Claude Dallemagne's brigade and Despinoy with Generals of Brigade Nicolas Bertin's and Jean Cervoni's brigades then counterattacked the town. In a tough four-hour fight, the French drove Ott's outnumbered soldiers out of Lonato and pushed them back to San Marco.

Leaving Oberst-Leutnant Anton Vogel and two battalions to hold Brescia, Quasdanovich advanced with Reuss, Sporck, Klenau, and Lusignan from Brescia to the southeast. He reached Montichiari, south of Lonato, in mid-morning and spent most of the day there. That evening, he returned to San Marco to join Ott, leaving Klenau in Montichiari. Also on 31 July, Sauret marched to Salò and defeated Ocskay in a pitched battle. The Austrians retreated to Gavardo. Having rescued Guieu and his men, Sauret returned to Desenzano, where he rendezvoused with Masséna and Despinoy.

=== 1 and 2 August ===
On 1 August, Bonaparte assembled 12,000 men under Generals of Division Pierre Augereau and Charles Edward Jennings de Kilmaine and moved northwest from Goito toward Brescia, pushing Klenau's weak force before him. Shaken by his setbacks at Lonato and Salò, Quasdanovich ordered all of his troops north to Gavardo. Bonaparte recaptured Brescia without opposition, and was soon joined there by Masséna and Despinoy. Klenau moved northeast toward Gavardo to join Quasdanovich. Vogel retreated to Caino in the mountains.

On 2 August, Quasdanovich regrouped at Gavardo and sent Ocskay's brigade to reoccupy Salò. With Brescia now secure, Bonaparte ordered Masséna to San Marco, while Augereau and Kilmaine marched back to Montichiari. Despinoy held Rezzato and Brescia where he was joined by a demi-brigade from Milan. Bonaparte directed Guieu, who replaced the injured Sauret, to march from Lonato to retake Salò the next day. Forces under Despinoy from Brescia and Dallemagne from Lonato were sent to attack Gavardo.

== Battle: 3 August ==
=== Lonato ===
During the night, Ocskay at Salò started south along the lake road. Guieu marched north on an obscure lane, completely missing Ocskay, who reached Lonato's outskirts via Desenzano. Keeping Sporck's brigade to hold Gavardo, Quasdanovich sent Ott and Reuss south on 3 August.

Ocskay's brigade attacked Lonato at dawn, defeated BG Jean Pijon's brigade, and captured its commander. Masséna, whose division lay between San Marco and Lonato, counterattacked the Austrians from the west at midday. Bonaparte directed the battle. Assaulted by the brigades of Pijon (now led by Colonel Jean-Andoche Junot) on the north, BG Claude Victor and BG Antoine Rampon in the center, and BG Jean Lorcet on the south, Ocskay's outnumbered men were driven from Lonato and pursued toward Desenzano. But Junot's men, plus the Guides and the 15th Dragoons, captured Desenzano first, freeing 150 French prisoners from Pijon's morning fight. Hemmed in by his enemies, Ocskay surrendered with the rump of his brigade. The rest scattered across the countryside. During the fighting in Desenzano, Junot suffered severe saber cuts on his head from Austrian cavalrymen.

=== Paitone ===
Moving from Rezzato, Despinoy attacked Ott piecemeal and was repulsed. After some fighting, the French general withdrew toward Brescia. Doggedly, Dallemagne moved around Ott's east flank and even reached Gavardo twice, but each time the Austrians drove him back. Dallemagne retreated to Brescia, where he reported sick. Casualties and other details of these fights are unknown. Because of the French attacks, Ott did not advance farther south than Paitone, south of Gavardo. At some time during the day, Klenau reinforced Ott. Reuss was sent cross-country to establish contact with Ocskay.

=== Desenzano ===
With his brigade of 1,800 men, Reuss soon appeared at Desenzano, recaptured the town, and rescued a number of prisoners from Ocskay's command. After learning the fate of Ocskay's brigade and finding that Massena's victorious division was closing in on him, Reuss beat a hasty retreat back to Gavardo, harassed by the French. He lost several prisoners on his retreat. Others were rescued by Major Gustave Maelcamp's small Austrian flotilla on the lake.

=== Salò ===
Meanwhile, Guieu reached Salò, found it unoccupied, and turned west to menace Gavardo. The French soon came upon and captured Quasdanovich's artillery park. But Sporck counterattacked and recaptured the guns. The day ended with Sporck holding the heights west of Salò while the French controlled the town. That evening, Quasdanovich ordered Ott to join him on the heights. Reuss turned up with his brigade during the night with the tidings of Ocskay's disaster. A council of war determined to retreat. Having heard nothing from Wurmser, Quasdanovich hoped to rejoin his colleague by marching around the north end of Lake Garda.

=== Castiglione ===
On the morning of 3 August, Wurmser's 4,000-man advance guard under GM Anton Lipthay lay eight kilometers to the south of Lonato near Castiglione delle Stiviere. The Austrian commander planned to move to Quasdanovich's help, but the French pre-empted him. Augereau launched an enveloping attack on Lipthay with 11,000 soldiers. Despite being greatly outnumbered, Lipthay put up a terrific fight, giving ground only grudgingly. He was, however, forced to abandon Castiglione and fall back southeast toward Solferino. Lipthay's stubborn defense allowed Wurmser time to concentrate his forces. GM Anton Schübirz marched to the sound of the guns and counterattacked Augereau's left flank near Solferino. FML Paul Davidovich formed his division in support. By the end of the day, Wurmser had the bulk of his 20,000 soldiers on hand. French losses are not known, but BG Martial Beyrand was killed, BG Jean Robert was wounded, and "great losses had been suffered by both sides." The Austrians lost about 1,000 casualties, including GM Franz Nicoletti wounded.

== Battle: 4 August ==
Quasdanovich issued orders to retreat north toward Lake Idro at 2:00 am. In the confusion, one Austrian column found itself cut off from the rest of the corps and made a desperate march to the southeast to reach Wurmser. The Austrians marched into Lonato early in the morning, nearly capturing Bonaparte. Napoleon was at Lonato with only 1,200 French against 3,000 Austrians. Napoleon informed the Austrian officer that his "whole army" was present, and that "if in eight minutes his division had not laid down its arms, [he] would not spare a man." Napoleon supported this ruse by issuing orders to his aide-de-camp Berthier about grenadier and artillery units that Berthier knew were entirely bogus. Oberst Knorr surrendered one battalion each of De Vins IR # 37 and Erbach IR # 42, a total of 2,000 men and 3 cannons. The Austrians only discovered once they had surrendered and been disarmed that there were no French forces nearby, and that they could have captured Napoleon with ease. Bonaparte sent Guieu to observe the Austrian withdrawal.

== Results ==
In the battles on 3 and 4 August, the Austrians lost 23 cannons and at least 5,000 killed, wounded, and captured. French losses were at least 2,000. More importantly, Quasdanovich's defeat allowed Bonaparte to mass over 30,000 men against Wurmser's 25,000, resulting in a French victory in the Battle of Castiglione on 5 August. This defeat forced Wurmser to withdraw to Trento and abandon the campaign.

== See also ==
- Siege of Mantua (1796–1797)

Preceded by Peace of Basel	French Revolution: Revolutionary campaigns Battle of Lonato	Succeeded by Battle of Castiglione
