= Claude Dallemagne =

French general (1754–1813)

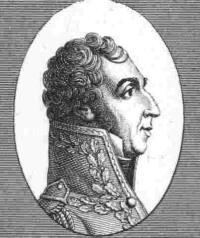
Claude Dallemagne

Claude Dallemagne (French pronunciation: [klod dalmaɲ]; 8 November 1754, Peyrieu, Ain – 12 June 1813) started his career in the French army under the Bourbons, fought in the American Revolutionary War, rose in rank to become a general officer during the French Revolutionary Wars, took part in the 1796 Italian campaign under Napoleon Bonaparte, and held military posts during the Napoleonic Wars.

== Early career ==
Born on 8 November 1754 to parents Balthazar D'Allemagne (1710–1772) and Marie Lasalle (1731–1799), Claude D'Allemagne grew up in Peyrieu, Ain, France. A year after his father died, he enrolled in the Hainaut Regiment, taking Dallemagne as his new surname. In 1777, his battalion embarked for the West Indies with Comte d'Estaing's fleet. He fought in actions at Dominica, St. Vincent, Grenada, and St. Lucia, being wounded in the latter combat. In 1779 he took part in the ill-fated Siege of Savannah in Georgia. By 1786, he earned advancement to sergeant-major.

== Revolution ==
=== Rapid promotion ===
Under the French Revolution, the pace of Dallemagne's promotions quickened. He became sous-lieutenant in September 1791, lieutenant in June 1792, and captain that September. In late 1793, he fought at the Siege of Toulon, winning promotion to general of brigade. After a brief stint in the Army of the western Pyrenees, he transferred to the Army of Italy in early 1794. That year he captured the Col de Tende. He also served in the 1795 campaign.

=== Italy ===
In April 1796, Dallemagne commanded a brigade in Francois Macquard's division. His troops were ordered to the front after the Montenotte Campaign forced the Kingdom of Sardinia-Piedmont to sue for peace. Bonaparte formed an advanced guard by combining 3,500 converged foot grenadiers and carabiniers with 1,500 cavalry. Assigning Dallemagne to command the advanced guard, Bonaparte sent it marching along the south bank of the Po River to turn Austrian General Johann Beaulieu's left flank. Supported by the division of Amédée Laharpe, Dallemagne crossed to the north bank and defeated the Austrians at the Battle of Fombio on 7–8 May 1796. Two days later, he led his troops at the successful Battle of Lodi. Along with André Masséna, Jean Lannes, Louis Berthier, and Jean-Baptiste Cervoni, he bravely rallied the troops to cross the bridge after cannon fire caused them to hesitate.

In July, Bonaparte detached Dallemagne's brigade from Jean Serurier's division and sent it to reinforce Masséna. He led his soldiers with distinction at the Battle of Lonato. On 31 July, his troops helped recover Lonato from Peter Ott's Austrians. On 3 August, Ott repulsed his attack on Gavardo but this action allowed Masséna to mass against and destroy Joseph Ocskay's brigade. Two days later, Dallemagne fought at the Battle of Castiglione. He received promotion to general of division on 15 August.

Dallemagne held important posts during the Siege of Mantua. After the Battle of Bassano and the combat of La Favorita, he led an attack to drive the Austrian garrison back within the fortress on 24 September. During the Battle of Arcole campaign, Dallemagne led a small division under the orders of Charles Kilmaine. In the Battle of Rivoli campaign, he commanded a division under Serurier in the siege. A division came under his orders in the invasion of Austrian during the spring of 1797.

=== Retirement ===
Beginning in 1797, Dallemagne held commands at Boulogne, Ancona, Rome, and Mainz. He asked to be retired from the army in December 1799, which became official in 1802. Meanwhile, he began a political career and served as a deputy in the Corps législatif from 1802 to 1813. Dallemagne married Jeanne Christine Gaudet (1785–1849) on 19 February 1800. They had two sons, Clément and Claudius.

== Empire ==
In 1803, Dallemagne became a Legionnaire in the Légion d'honneur and the following year a Commandant. Emperor Napoleon called him back to active duty in 1807. He commanded a corps of observation until 1809, being posted in Pomerania and Berlin. Appointed governor of Wesel from March 1809 to March 1810, he briefly participated in the Walcheren Campaign. He transferred to command the military division of Caen from 1810 to 1813. The emperor granted him the title of Baron in March 1813. Dallemagne died in Nemours on 12 June 1813. DALLEMAGNE is inscribed on Column 26 of the Arc de Triomphe in Paris.
