= Battle of Castiglione =

1796 battle during the War of the First Coalition

Second Battle of Castiglione
- Part of the Italian campaign of 1796–1797 in the War of the First Coalition
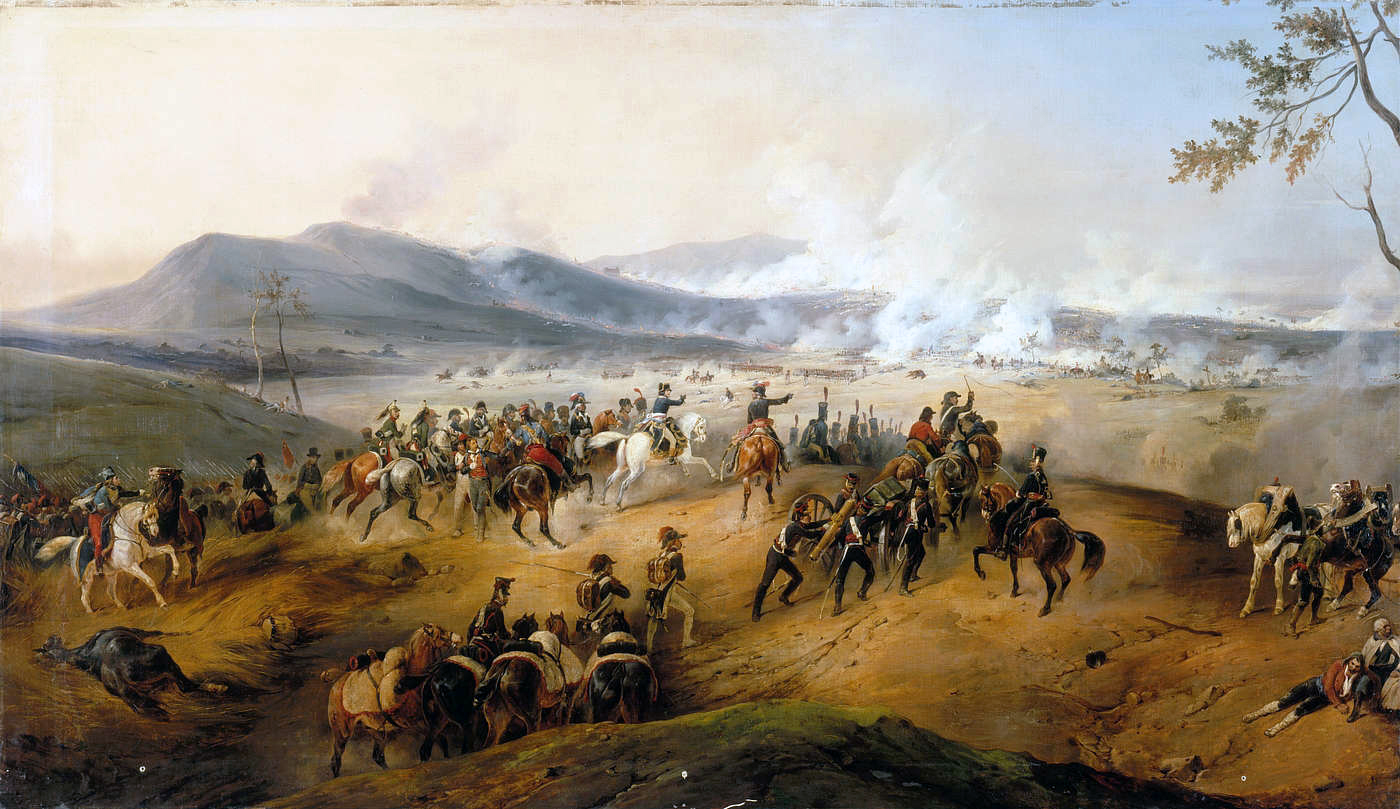
- 5 August 1796, approximately 10 hours. Battle of Castiglione. Under the command of Napoleon, Marmont brings artillery onto Mount Medolano while Augereau's division begins the attack in the central plain.
Date	5 August 1796
Location	Castiglione delle Stiviere, Italy 45°23′N 10°29′E
Result	French victory

Belligerents
France	Habsburg monarchy

Commanders and leaders
Napoleon Bonaparte; Pierre Augereau; Hyacinthe François Joseph Despinoy; Auguste de Marmont; André Masséna; Pascal Antoine Fiorella; Charles Edward Jennings	Dagobert Sigmund von Wurmser; Anton Lipthay (WIA); Paul Davidovich; Karl Philipp Sebottendorf; Anton Schübirz von Chobinin

Strength
Battle: 30,000	Battle: 25,000

Casualties and losses
Battle: 1,300	Battle: 3,000, 20 guns
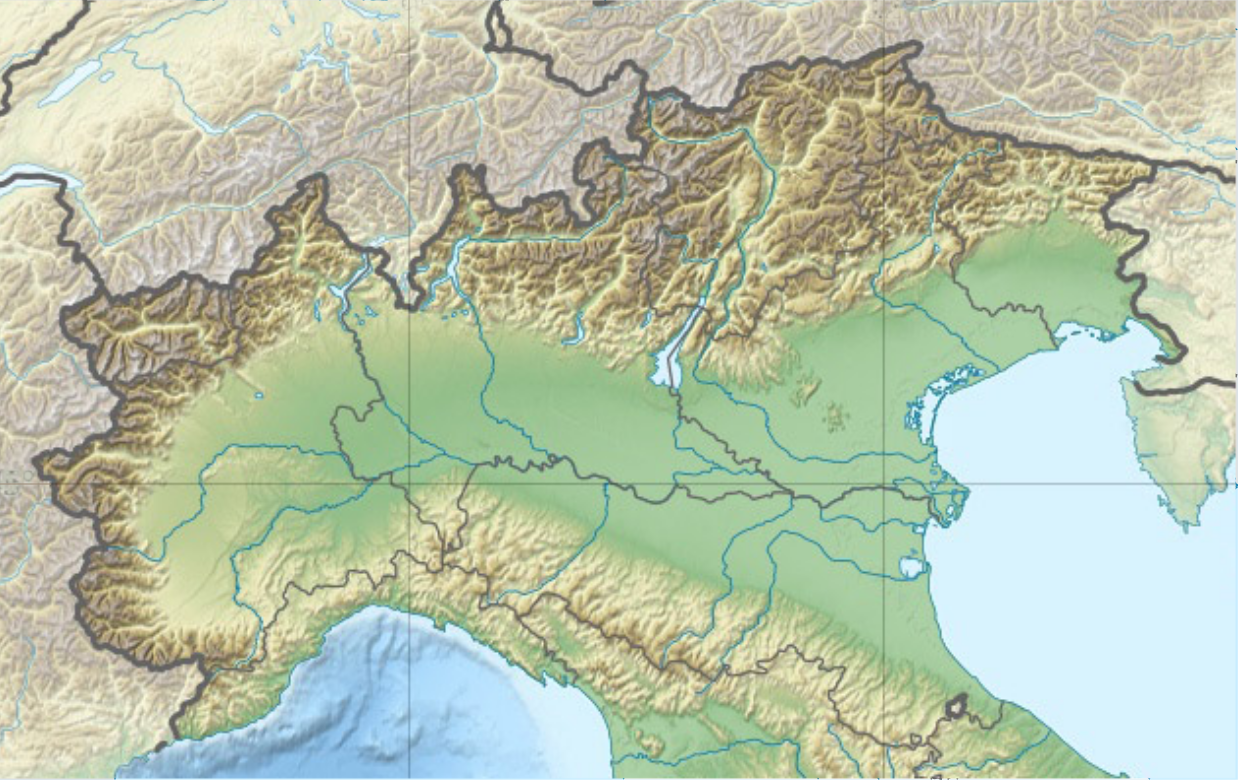
- Location within Northern Italy Battle of Castiglione (Europe)

War of the First Coalition:
Italian Campaign
current battle
Napoleon as subordinate
Napoleon in command

The Battle of Castiglione saw the French Army of Italy under General Napoleon Bonaparte attack an army of the Habsburg monarchy led by Feldmarschall Dagobert Sigmund von Wurmser on 5 August 1796. The outnumbered Austrians were defeated and driven back along a line of hills to the river crossing at Borghetto, where they retired beyond the Mincio River. The town of Castiglione delle Stiviere is located 10 kilometres (6 mi) south of Lake Garda in northern Italy. This battle was one of four famous victories won by Bonaparte during the War of the First Coalition, part of the French Revolutionary Wars. The others were Bassano, Arcole, and Rivoli.

Castiglione was the first attempt by the Austrian army to break the French Siege of Mantua, which was the primary Austrian fortress in northern Italy. To achieve this goal, Wurmser planned to lead four converging columns against the French. It succeeded insofar as Bonaparte lifted the siege in order to have the manpower sufficient to meet the threat. But his skill and the speed of his troops' march allowed the French army commander to keep the Austrian columns separated and defeat each in detail over a period of about one week. Although the final flank attack was prematurely delivered, it nevertheless resulted in a victory. Nevertheless, the battle marked the end of four months of rapid French advances across Northern Italy, and the front lines would remain anchored around Mantua until its fall in February of 1797.

== Background ==
See Castiglione 1796 Campaign Order of Battle for French and Austrian units and organizations.

=== Plans ===
After being defeated at the battles of Fombio, Lodi, and Borghetto by Bonaparte, the Austrian Army under Feldzeugmeister Johann Peter Beaulieu left almost 14,000 soldiers in the fortress of Mantua and retreated north toward Trento. Mantua was one of four famous fortresses known as the Quadrilateral. The French army occupied the other three, Legnago, Verona and Peschiera.

On 31 May, Bonaparte tried to rush Mantua, but the attempt failed. By 3 June, the French army invested the place, which was defended by Joseph Franz Canto d'Irles's Austrian garrison and 316 cannons. In June, Bonaparte's army forced the Papal States, Tuscany, Parma and Modena to make peace, extorting large contributions. By taking artillery pieces from the subdued cities, the French general assembled a siege train of 179 cannons for his siege of Mantua. The formal siege began on 4 July.

Bonaparte positioned his 46,000 soldiers to protect the siege of Mantua. Pierre François Sauret held Brescia and the western side of Lake Garda. André Masséna guarded the northern approaches with the bulk of his force in the upper Adige River valley on the east side of Lake Garda. Masséna also garrisoned Verona. Pierre Augereau covered the lower Adige on either side of Legnago. Jean-Mathieu-Philibert Sérurier led the force besieging Mantua. Hyacinthe Despinoy had one demi-brigade at Peschiera, another with Masséna and more troops on the march. Charles Edward Jennings de Kilmaine's cavalry reserve lay at Villafranca di Verona, southwest of Verona.

Wurmser devised a four-column plan of attack. He retained direct control over the two central columns. Leading the Right-Center (2nd) Column, Michael von Melas struck south with 14,000 soldiers down the west bank of the Adige. Paul Davidovich led the 10,000 men of the Left-Center (3rd) Column down the east bank. Operating west of Lake Garda, Peter Quasdanovich commanded the Right (1st) Column's 18,000 men. Johann Mészáros von Szoboszló lay at Vicenza, with the 5,000 troops of the Left (4th) Column. His orders were to occupy Verona and Legnago as soon as the French evacuated the two cities.

=== Operations ===
In late July, the Austrian army advanced from Trento. Wurmser's two center columns defeated Masséna in the difficult rough terrain near Rivoli Veronese on 29 July. For a loss of 800 men, the Austrian inflicted 1,200 killed and wounded, and captured 1,600 men and nine cannons. One of Quasdanovich's brigades drove Sauret's men out of Salò on Lake Garda. A second Austrian brigade pushed a French force out of Gavardo. On 30 July, the other two brigades belonging to Quasdanovich surprised and captured Brescia. Augereau fell back toward Mantua. Masséna retreated to the southern end of Lake Garda.

On 31 July, Bonaparte retreated to the west bank of the Mincio and began concentrating against Quasdanovich. That evening Napoleon ordered Sérurier to lift the siege of Mantua. From 31 July through 2 August, a complex series of operations occurred in the area of Brescia, Montichiari, Gavardo, Lonato del Garda and Salò. Bonaparte concentrated Augereau, Masséna, Despinoy, and Kilmaine and recaptured Brescia on 1 August, clearing his supply line to the west. Meanwhile, Wurmser dropped off a force under General-major (GM) Adam Bajalics von Bajahaza to lay siege to Peschiera. His center columns reached Mantua where they spent time demolishing the French siege lines and dragging the abandoned siege guns into the city. Bonaparte nearly ordered a retreat to the west, but when he realised Wurmser was not quickly following up his success, he decided to fight it out. Mészáros finally occupied Legnago on 1 August.

On 2 August, Wurmser's 4,000-man advance guard under GM Anton Lipthay de Kisfalud drove General of Brigade (BG) Antoine Valette's brigade out of Castiglione. The next day, Augereau attacked Lipthay with 11,000 troops. In a bitter fight, the French forced Lipthay back to Solferino where he was reinforced by Davidovich. At length, Wurmser came up with his entire field army and stopped Augereau's drive. The Austrians suffered 1,000 casualties and GM Franz Nicoletti wounded. French losses may have exceeded 1,000 men, including BG Martial Beyrand killed. At the time, Wurmser and Quasdanovich's forces were about eight kilometers apart. On 3 August, the French defeated Quasdanovich, who retreated northwards, in the Battle of Lonato. Sending General Guieu in pursuit of Quasdanovich, Bonaparte now massed against Wurmser.

On 4 August, both armies skirmished. Wurmser arranged for Bajalics to send him a reinforcement of four battalions under Oberst Franz Weidenfeld. He also directed Mészáros to block Sérurier from joining Bonaparte. On this day, the French captured 2,000 Austrians of Quasdanovich's column in Lonato.

== Battle ==
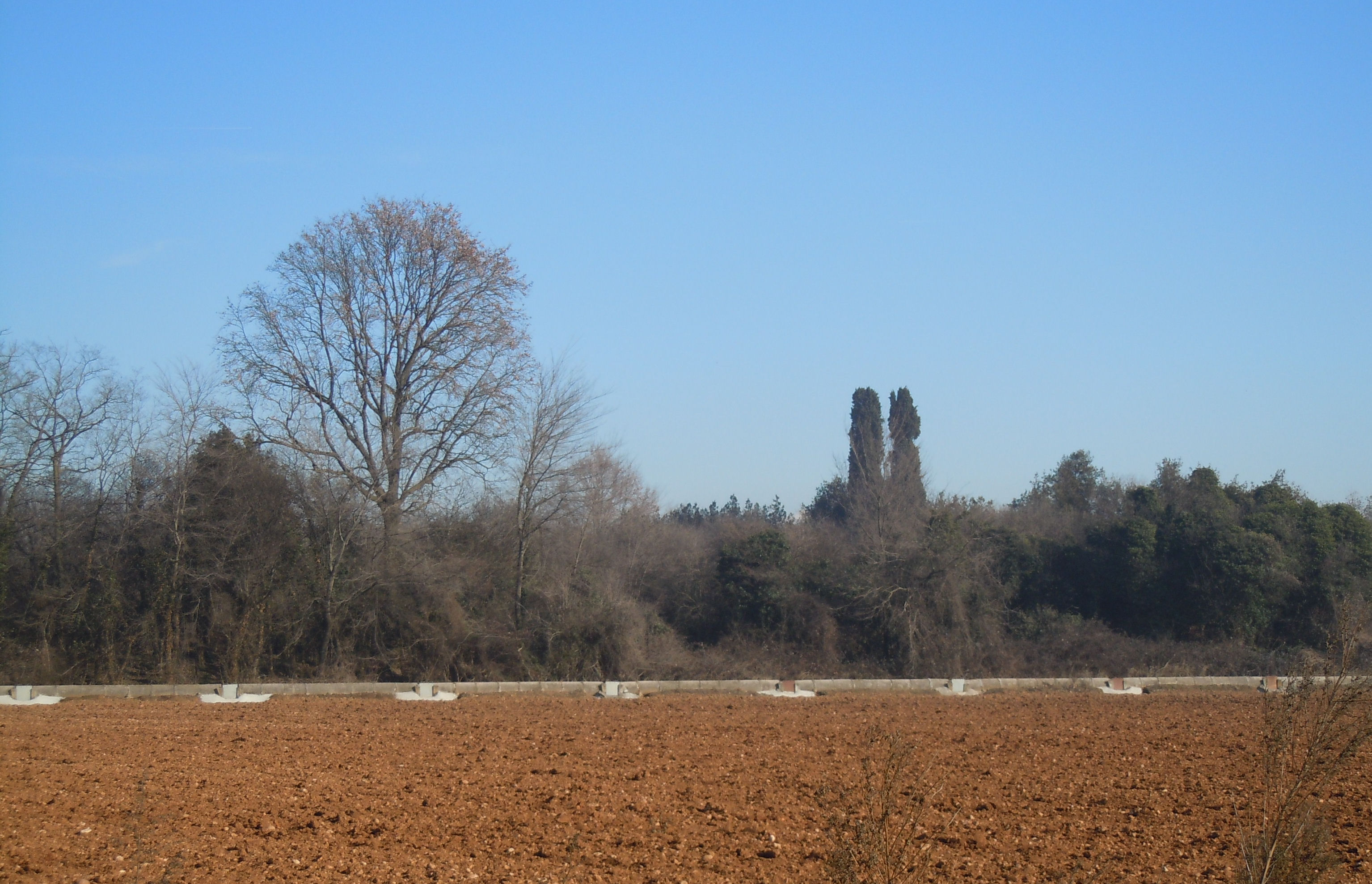
Monte Medolano

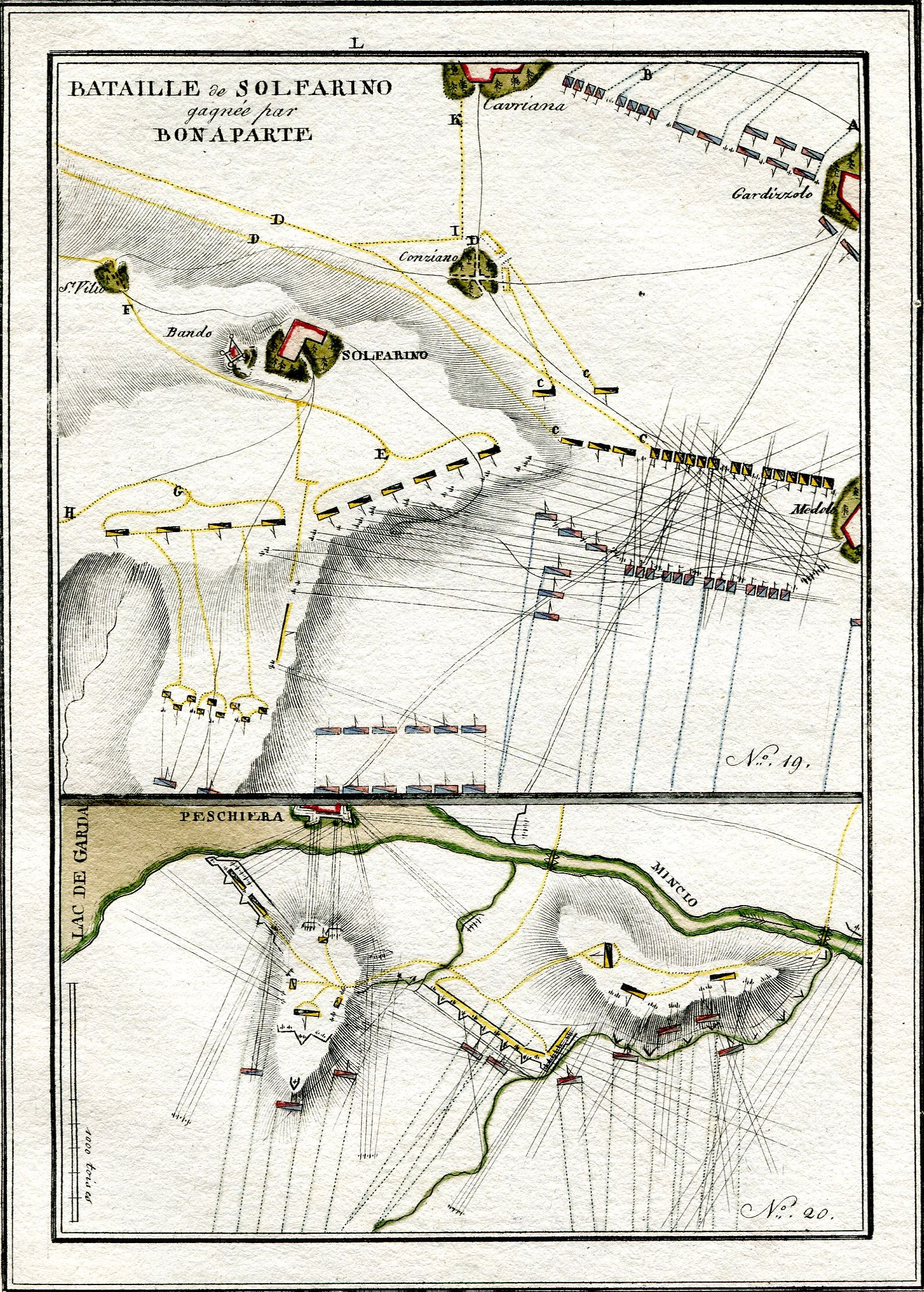
Maps of the battle of Solfarino and Peschiera 1796

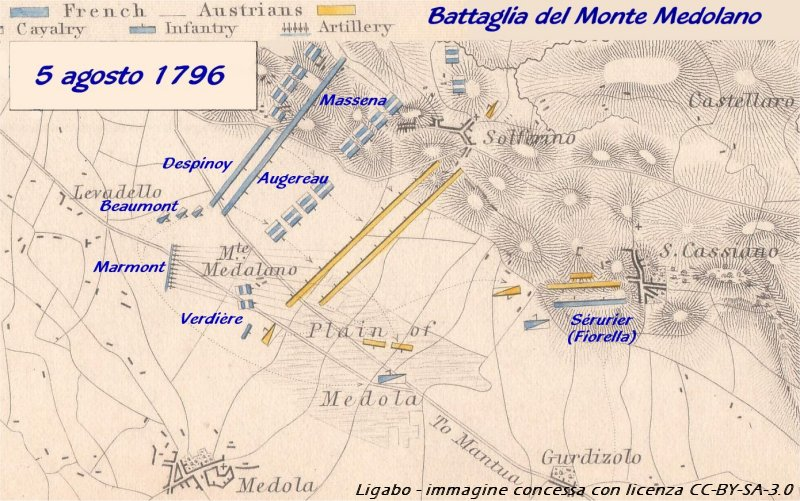
A map of the French and Austrians' struggle for Monte Medolano 1796

By 5 August, Wurmser had concentrated 20,000 soldiers at Castiglione, including GM Josef Philipp Vukassovich's brigade from the Mantua garrison. Drawing up his army in two lines, he anchored his right flank on high ground near the village and castle of Solferino. The Austrian left held Monte Medolano, a small hilltop crowned by a redoubt and some heavy guns. Bonaparte's forces had swollen to 22,500 in the divisions of Masséna and Augereau. He was expecting to be reinforced by Despinoy during the day. While he pinned Wurmser with a frontal attack, the French army commander arranged for 5,000 men of Sérurier's division to smash into the Austrian left rear. When the Austrian lines were bent into a V-shape, Bonaparte would break the hinge of the enemy's front with an assault on Monte Medolano, led by general Verdier. During this battle Napoleon experimented with the famous "manoeuvre sur le derrières" that would become the key for future success.

In order to draw Wurmser further into his trap, Bonaparte ordered Masséna and Augereau to retreat. When he suddenly pulled the two divisions back, the Austrians obligingly followed. Sérurier's troops, commanded this day by General of Brigade Pascal Antoine Fiorella, then appeared, led by the 5th Dragoons. Wurmser switched his second line to hold off this threat to his rear. The Austrian also quickly pulled back his first line. At this point, Bonaparte launched his masse de rupture against Monte Medolano. Chef de battalion Auguste Marmont galloped his horse artillery up to point blank range and opened fire. Grenadiers then stormed the hill. As Masséna and Augereau attacked in front, two of Despinoy's demi-brigades led by Chef de Brigade Charles Leclerc arrived and captured Solferino. After tough fighting, Wurmser ordered a retreat to avoid being enveloped. Weidenfeld's force arrived in time to help fend off an attempt by Masséna to get around the Austrian right flank. Covered by some cavalry led by GM Anton Schübirz von Chobinin, the Austrians managed to retreat across the Mincio at Borghetto that evening.

== Results ==
In the battle, the Austrians suffered 2,000 killed and wounded, plus 1,000 men and 20 cannons captured. The French probably lost between 1,100 and 1,500 men. Lipthay was severely wounded. Determined not to let Wurmser remain near Mantua, Bonaparte feinted with Augereau's division against Borghetto. But the real attack was launched by Masséna through Peschiera. This effort forced back Bajalics and GM Anton Ferdinand Mittrowsky. His line of communications to the County of Tyrol threatened, Wurmser ordered a retreat to the north.

Before quitting the area, the Austrian commander reinforced Mantua with two brigades under GM Ferdinand Minckwitz and GM Leberecht Spiegel, sent in much-needed food and evacuated the sick. Wurmser then retreated up the east bank of the Adige to Trento. Bonaparte invested Mantua again. But, without siege guns, he could only blockade the place and hope to starve it into surrender. In the campaign, the French lost 6,000 killed and wounded, plus 4,000 men and their siege train captured. Total Austrian casualties numbered 16,700.

== Commentary ==
Historian David G. Chandler writes,

The form of the battle proves beyond any doubt that Napoleon's master battle plan was already clear in his mind as early as 1796. In subsequent years he might polish and improve its technique—especially the crucial matter of timing the successive stages—but all the elements of the successful attacks carried out at Austerlitz, Friedland or Bautzen were already in existence and in operation at the battle of Castiglione.

== In popular culture ==
The Battle of Castiglione is witnessed by the title characters of the humorous fantasy movie Time Bandits (1981) in an early part of the film.

== Bibliography ==
- Boycott-Brown, Martin. The Road to Rivoli. London: Cassell & Co., 2001. ISBN 0-304-35305-1
- Chandler, David. Dictionary of the Napoleonic Wars. New York: Macmillan, 1979. ISBN 0-02-523670-9
- Chandler, David. The Campaigns of Napoleon. New York: Macmillan, 1966.
- Fiebeger, G. J. (1911). The Campaigns of Napoleon Bonaparte of 1796–1797. West Point, New York: US Military Academy Printing Office.
- Schels, J. B. 'Die Operationen des FM Grafen Wurmser am Ende Juli und Anfang August 1796, zum Ensatz von Mantua; mit der Schlacht bei Castiglione.' Oesterreichische Militärische Zeitschrift, Bd. 1; Bd. 2 (1830): 254–97; 41–81, 129–59
- Smith, Digby. The Napoleonic Wars Data Book. London: Greenhill, 1998. ISBN 1-85367-276-9
- Voykowitsch, Bernhard. Castiglione 1796: Napoleon repulses Wurmser's first attack, Vienna: Helmet, 1998. ISBN 978-3901923005

Preceded by Battle of Lonato	French Revolution: Revolutionary campaigns Battle of Castiglione	Succeeded by Battle of Theiningen
