= Lipthay de Kisfalud et Lubelle =

Hungarian Catholic family, member of ancient ministerial nobility

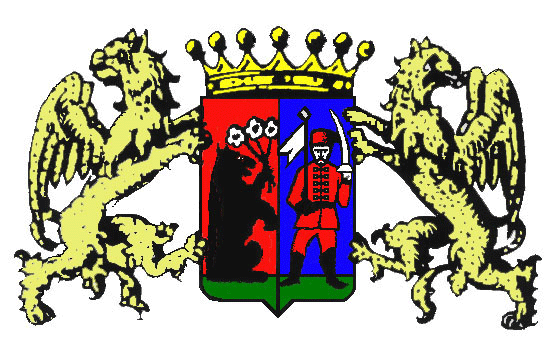
Coat of Arms of Lipthay de Kisfalud et Lubelle

The Lipthay de Kisfalud et Lubelle family (Roman Catholics) is member of the Hungarian ancient ministerial nobility. The family's origin goes back to the 13th century, in 1248, when King Béla IV of Hungary granted land to Miloth, son of Bosin. Miloth, ancestor of Lipthay's was the only of the family surviving the Battle of Mohi of 11 April 1241.

Zaád, son of Miloth, grandson of Bosin, exchanged his inheritance with King Charles I of Hungary for Lubelle in Liptó County in year 1341. The property remained until 1945 in hands of the noble branches of the family.

In 1435, the family name of the great-grandson of Zaád, Bálint I was Lipthay de Lubelle. His descendants, in 1465, granted with land in Kisfalud, Nógrád County by King Mathias Corvinus I, were adding the name of the place - Kisfalud - to the family's last name. Out of the flourishing noble branches of the family, two lines got the hereditary title of baron. The eldest baron line, until 1945 at its domain of Lovrin, in Temes County, a property granted to the family per Royal Decree on 4 April 1791, was bestowed with the hereditary title of baron with membership at the Hungarian Parliaments Upper House. The title and diploma was forwarded in Vienna by Emperor Francis I and King of Hungary, to Frigyes, son of Field Marshal Antal Lipthay de Kisfalud et Lubelle, Knight of the Maria Therese Military Order, on 11 June 1830, later ratified in 1886.

The second title of baron, without membership in the Parliaments Upper House, was forwarded by King Charles IV in Reichenau on 13 October 1917 to Béla, Royal Counsel, and to his brother Gyula, Officer of the Imperial and Royal Army, both of the younger line of the Lipthay de Kisfalud et Lubelle family.

The younger baron's line expired in its male line with the death in combat of István on 30 August 1942. The eldest baron's line and noble branches of the Lipthay de Kifalud et Lubelle family are still alive.

== See also ==
- Anton Lipthay de Kisfalud
- List of titled noble families in the Kingdom of Hungary
