= Anton Lipthay de Kisfalud =

Portrait of Anton Lipthay de Kisfalud, c. 1790s

Anton Lipthay de Kisfalud (1745 – 17 February 1800), also Anton Liptai or Anton Liptay, served in the Austrian army, attained general officer rank, and fought in several battles against the French army of Napoleon Bonaparte during the French Revolutionary Wars.

== Early career ==
Born in Nógrád, Hungary in 1745, as part of the Lipthay de Kisfalud et Lubelle family, Lipthay joined the army of the Habsburg monarchy and became a Major in 1788. He also earned the Knight's Cross in the Military Order of Maria Theresa that year. Promotion to Oberstleutnant came in 1789 and Oberst in 1793. He was appointed General-Major on 1 May 1795. He held the noble title of Freiherr.

== Italian Campaigns ==
In the spring of 1796, Lipthay served in Johann Beaulieu's army in northwest Italy. Lipthay led a brigade in Eugène Argenteau's wing during the Montenotte Campaign. After this campaign's unsuccessful conclusion, Beaulieu pulled the Austrian army back to the north bank of the Po River. Assigned to guard a long stretch of the river near Pavia, Lipthay found himself confronted with Bonaparte's major flanking maneuver. At the Battle of Fombio, his outnumbered command was beaten and driven back over the Adda River at Pizzighettone. Beaulieu next ordered him to seize the Venetian fortress of Peschiera del Garda, which he successfully carried out.

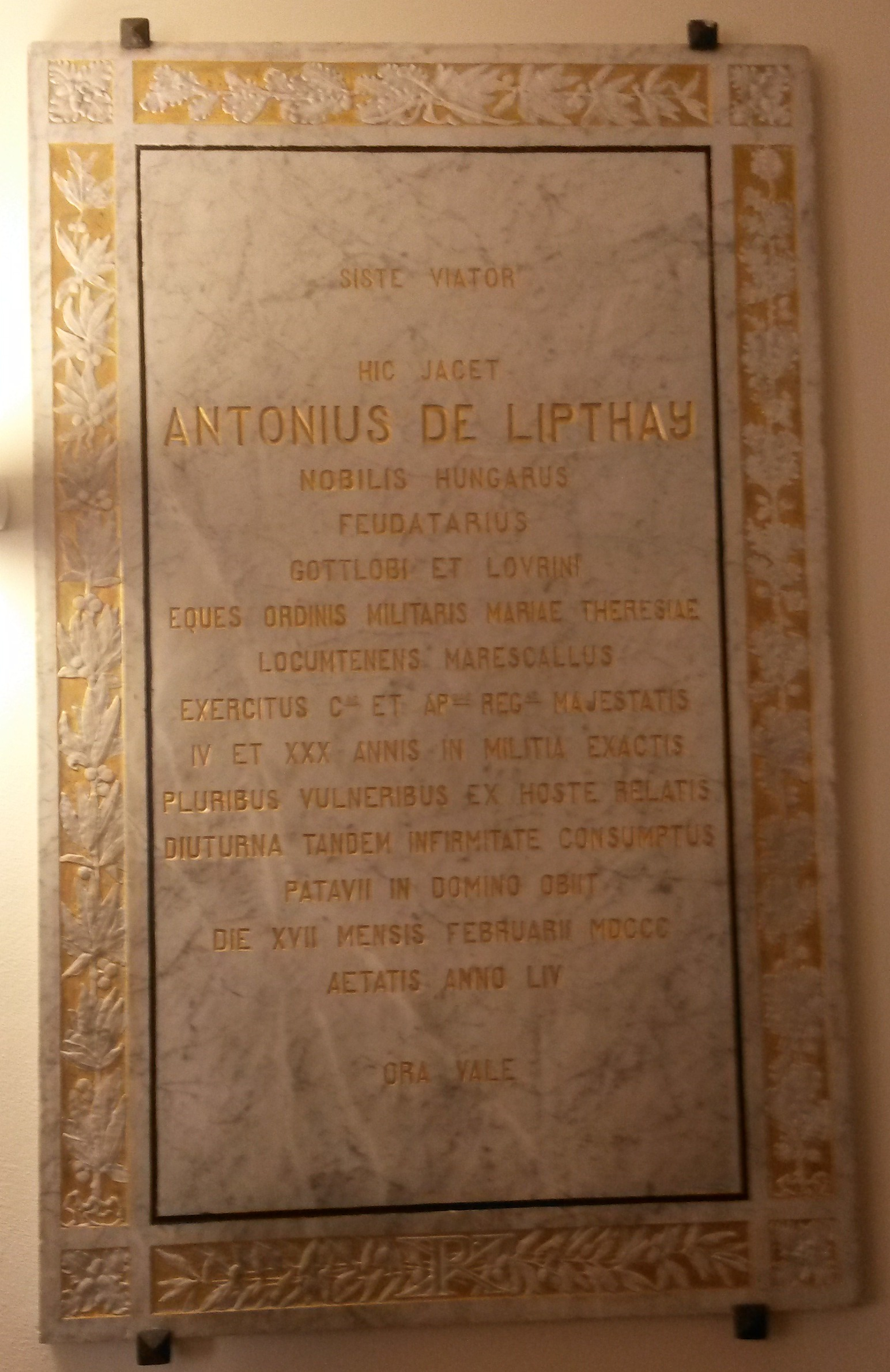
Anton de Lipthay's tombstone (Church of Chiesanuova in Padua)

When Dagobert von Wurmser launched the first relief of the Siege of Mantua in late July, Lipthay commanded a brigade in Paul Davidovich's left center column. On 3 August, while his 4,000 troops formed the army's advance guard at Castiglione delle Stiviere, he was attacked by 11,000 French soldiers under Pierre Augereau. "Lipthay's gallant defence had won precious time for Wurmser to arrive" and soon the Austrians assembled 20,000 men near Solferino. On 5 August at the Battle of Castiglione, "the Austrians had the misfortune to lose Lipthay, who was severely wounded."

During the third relief of Mantua, which ended in the Battle of Arcola on 15–17 November, Lipthay commanded a brigade in the Friaul Corps of Jozsef Alvinczi's army. In the Second Battle of Bassano on 6 November, his four battalions made a "heroic resistance" against André Masséna's repeated attacks on the Austrian left wing. Though his foot was injured when his horse was shot and fell on him, he did not leave his post. During the fourth relief attempt, Lipthay led one of the assault columns at the Battle of Rivoli. On the morning of 14 January 1797, his brigade succeeded in breaking the French left flank. Only the fortuitous arrival of French reinforcements under Masséna restored the line.

In the 1799 Italian campaign, Lipthay was wounded at Verona on 26 March. He received promotion to Feldmarschal-Leutnant on 2 October. However, he never recovered from his injuries and died at Padua on 17 February 1800.

== Bibliography ==
- Boycott-Brown, Martin. The Road to Rivoli. London: Cassell & Co., 2001. ISBN 0-304-35305-1
- Chandler, David. The Campaigns of Napoleon. New York: Macmillan, 1966.
- Fiebeger, G. J. (1911). The Campaigns of Napoleon Bonaparte of 1796–1797. West Point, New York: US Military Academy Printing Office.
- Smith, Digby. The Napoleonic Wars Data Book. London: Greenhill, 1998. ISBN 1-85367-276-9
