= Pascal Antoine Fiorella =

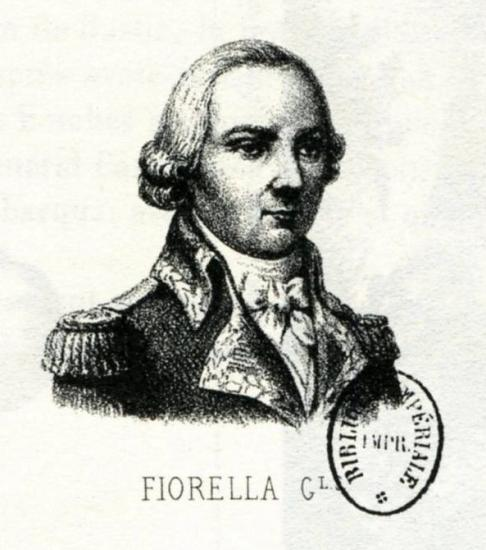
- Pascal Antoine Fiorella
- Born: 7 February 1752; Ajaccio, Corsica
- Died: 3 March 1818 (aged 66) Ajaccio, Corse-du-Sud, France
- Allegiance: First French Republic; Napoleonic Italy; First French Empire
- Branch: Infantry
- Service years: 1770–1817
- Rank: General of Division
- Conflicts: French Revolutionary Wars; Napoleonic Wars
- Awards: Légion d'Honneur, CC 1804; Order of the Iron Crown

Pascal Antoine Fiorella or Pasquale Antonio, comte Fiorella (7 February 1752 – 3 March 1818) was a cousin of Napoleon Bonaparte. He became a French general officer in the French Revolutionary Wars and led a brigade during Napoleon Bonaparte's famous campaign in Italy in 1796. A Corsican by birth, he joined the French Royal Army as a volunteer in 1770 and was quickly appointed an officer. When the French Revolution broke out, he was a captain. Elected lieutenant colonel of a volunteer battalion, he fought with the Army of the Alps. Transferred to the Army of Italy, he assumed command of the 46th Line Infantry Demi-Brigade in February 1794. He fought under André Masséna at Saorgio where he was wounded. In September 1794 he earned promotion to general of brigade and led the army reserve.

When Bonaparte took command of the Army of Italy in the spring of 1796 Fiorella led a brigade in Jean-Mathieu-Philibert Sérurier's division. He fought at Mondovì in April 1796. During the Battle of Castiglione on 5 August 1796, he took command of Sérurier's division and led it to attack the Austrian left rear. This maneuver resulted in an important French victory. During the Arcola campaign in November 1796, he led his troops at Calliano and was captured at Rivoli. Beginning in 1797, he saw service as a division commander in the armies of the French-allied Italian states. In 1799 he was forced to surrender Turin to the Austrians. He blockaded Venice in 1805 and was involved in suppressing the Tyrolean Rebellion in 1809. Despite joining Napoleon for the Hundred Days, he managed to secure retirement with the rank of General of Division commander in 1817. He died the next year in Ajaccio. His surname is one of the names inscribed under the Arc de Triomphe, on Column 21.
