= Peyrieu =

Commune in Auvergne-Rhône-Alpes, France

- Commune
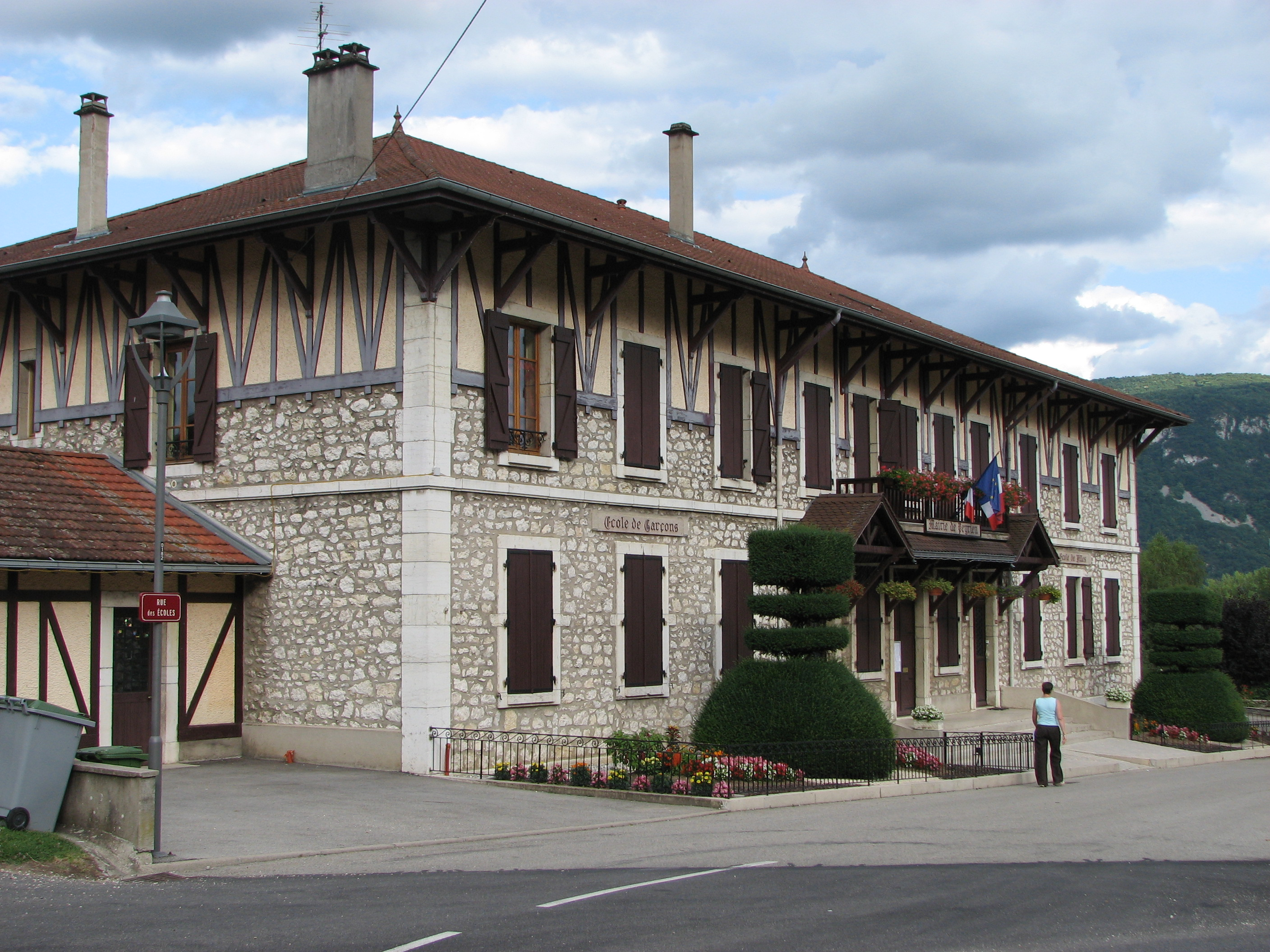
- Town hall
- Location of Peyrieu
- Location within France Location within Auvergne-Rhône-Alpes
- Coordinates: 45°40′35″N 5°40′38″E
- Country: France
- Region: Auvergne-Rhône-Alpes
- Department: Ain
- Arrondissement: Belley
- Canton: Belley

Government
  - Mayor (2026–32): Pierre Cochonat
- Area^{1}: 14.13 km^{2} (5.46 sq mi)
- Elevation: 225 m (738 ft)
- Highest elevation: 683 m (2,241 ft)
- Lowest elevation: 210 m (690 ft)
- Population (2023): 940
  - Density: 67/km^{2} (170/sq mi)
- Time zone: UTC+01:00 (CET)
  - Summer (DST): UTC+02:00 (CEST)
- INSEE/Postal code: 01294 /01300
- ^{1} French Land Register data, which excludes lakes, ponds, glaciers > 1 km^{2} (0.386 sq mi or 247 acres) and river estuaries.

Peyrieu (French pronunciation: [peʁjø]) is a commune in the Ain department in eastern France.

Town located 11 km south of Belley. It is on the right bank of the Rhône in the area of AOC wines of Bugey.

== Population ==
Historical population
Year	Pop.	±% p.a.
1968	574	—
1975	541	−0.84%
1982	558	+0.44%
1990	560	+0.04%
1999	646	+1.60%
2007	777	+2.33%
2012	831	+1.35%
2017	873	+0.99%
2023	940	+1.24%
Source: INSEE

The inhabitants of the town of Peyrieu are known as Peyriolans in French.

== See also ==
- Communes of the Ain department
