= Paitone =

Paitone Paitù
- Comune
- Comune di Paitone
- Location within Italy Location within Lombardy
- Coordinates: 45°33′N 10°24′E
- Country: Italy
- Region: Lombardy
- Province: Brescia (BS)
- Frazioni: Marguzzo, Pospesio, Sarzena, Soina, Tesio

Area
  - Total: 7 km^{2} (2.7 sq mi)

Population (2011)
  - Total: 2,132
  - Density: 300/km^{2} (790/sq mi)
- Time zone: UTC+1 (CET)
  - Summer (DST): UTC+2 (CEST)
- Postal code: 25080
- Dialing code: 030
- ISTAT code: 017132

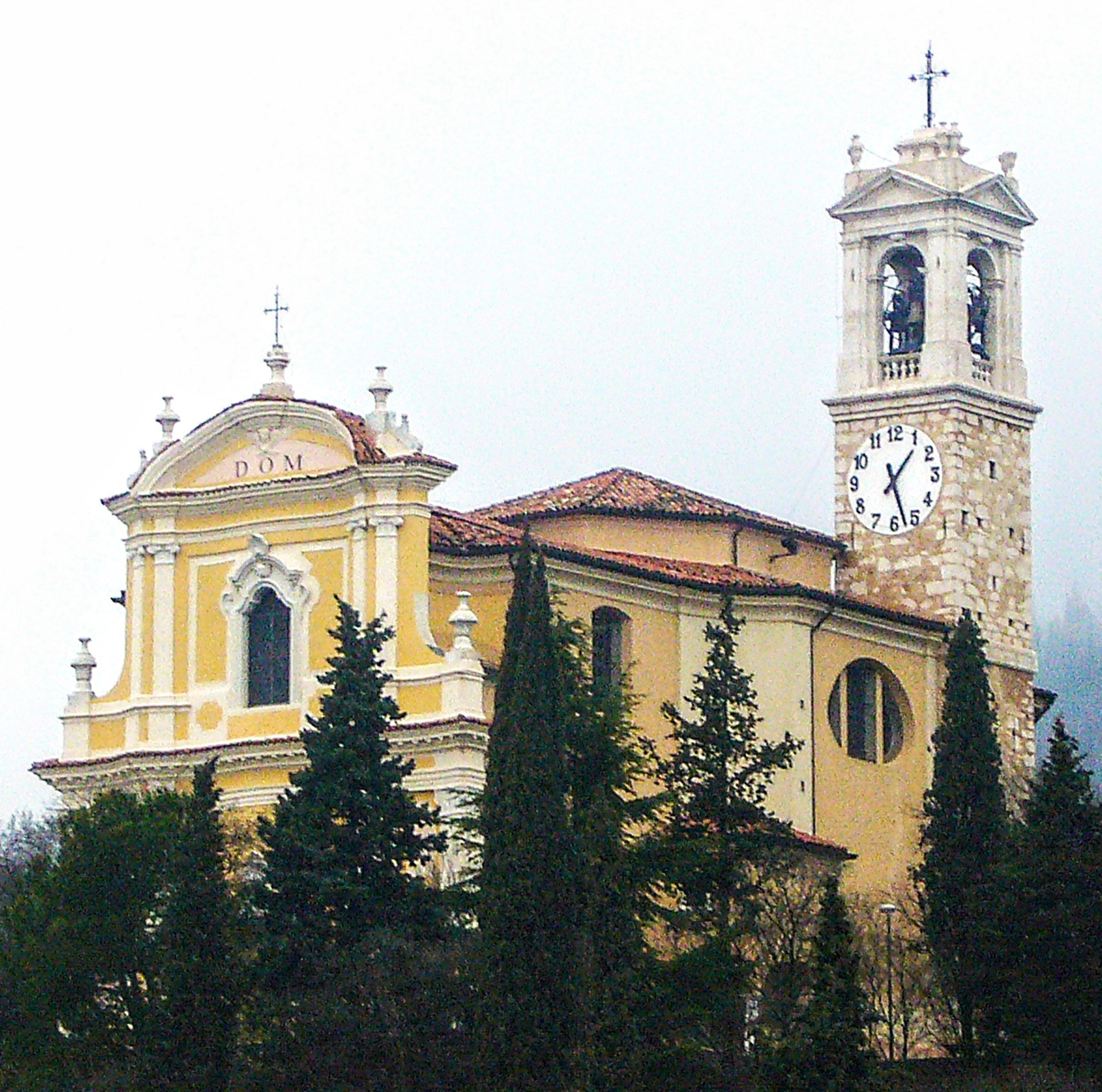

Paitone (Brescian: Paitù) is a comune in the province of Brescia, in Lombardy.
