= Dagobert Sigmund von Wurmser =

Austrian marshall

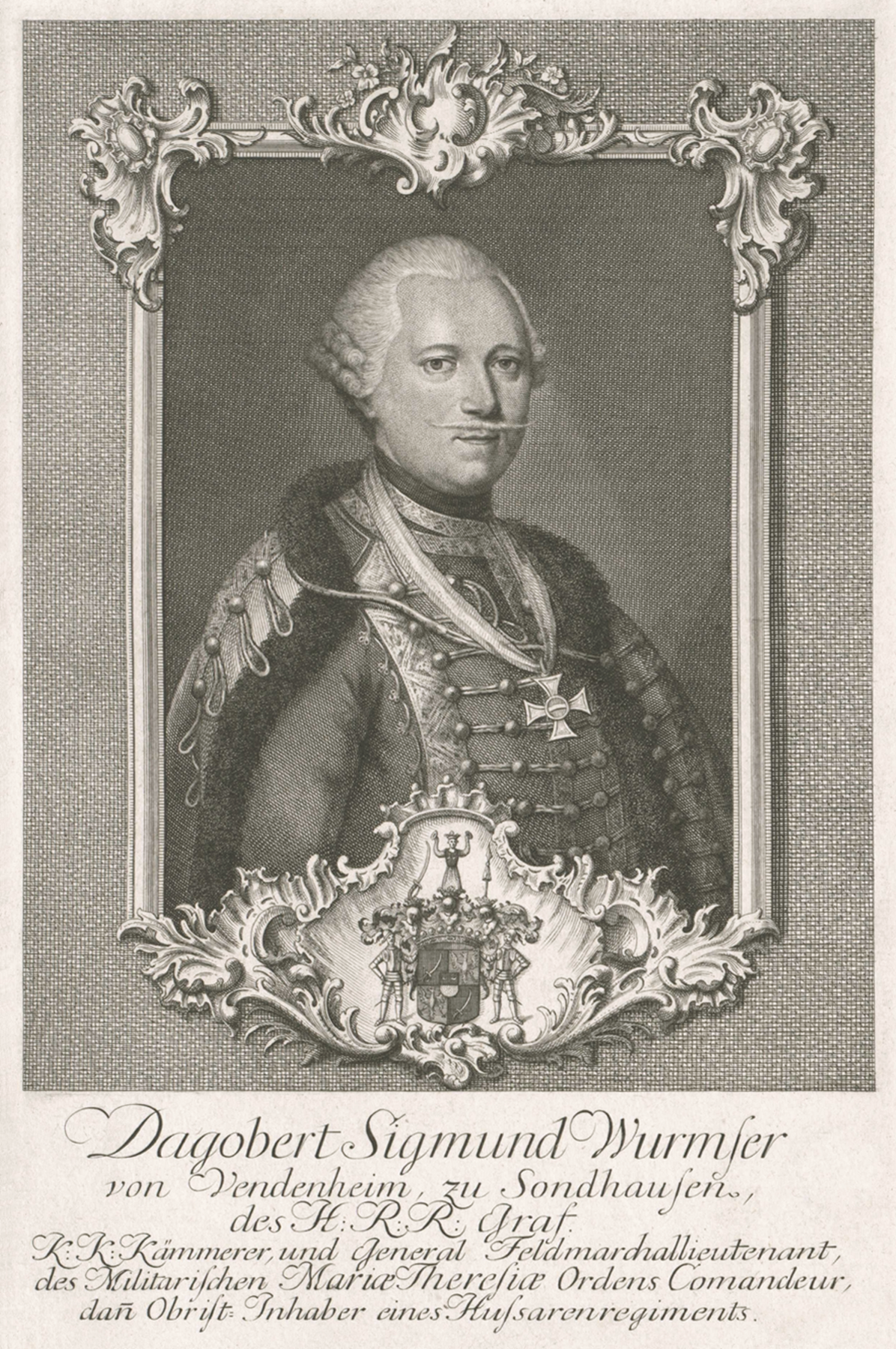
- Born: 7 May 1724; Strasbourg, Alsace, Kingdom of France
- Died: 22 August 1797 (aged 73); Vienna
- Military career
- Allegiance: Kingdom of France; Habsburg Monarchy
- Branch: (Kingdom of France) French Army (Habsburg monarchy) Imperial Army
- Service years: 1741–1763 (France); 1763–1796
- Rank: Field Marshal
- Conflicts: War of the Bavarian Succession; Skirmish at Habelschwerdt; Austro-Turkish War (1788–1791); French Revolutionary Wars; First Battle of Weissembourg; Rhine campaign of 1795; Battle of Mannheim; Battle of Castiglione; Battle of Bassano; Battle of San Giorgio
- Awards: 1778, Knight's Cross of the Military Order of Maria Theresa; 1789, Commander's Cross of the Military Order of Maria Theresa 1793, Grand Cross of the Military order of Maria Theresa
- Other work: Imperial and Royal Privy Councilor; Imperial and Royal Chamberlain.

Dagobert Sigmund, Count von Wurmser (7 May 1724 – 22 August 1797) was an Austrian field marshal during the French Revolutionary Wars. Although he fought in the Seven Years' War, the War of the Bavarian Succession, and mounted several successful campaigns in the Rhineland in the initial years of the French Revolutionary Wars, he is probably most remembered for his unsuccessful operations against Napoleon Bonaparte during the 1796 campaign in Italy.

Although initially in the Army of France during the Seven Years' War, Wurmser left France after Louis reached a peace agreement with Britain, and joined the military of the House of Habsburg. He later took part in the short-lived War of the Bavarian Succession, also called the so-called Kartoffelkrieg (Potato War). During the French Revolutionary Wars, Wurmser commanded several imperial Habsburg armies on in the Rhine River valley between 1793 and 1795, and perhaps his most conspicuous achievement was the taking of the lines of Lauterburg and Weissenburg in October 1793.

In 1796, Francis II, Holy Roman Emperor sent him to northern Italy, where the Habsburg military defended Austria's southern territories. In a series of well-fought battles with the French army, under the command of the up-and-coming general Napoleon Bonaparte, Wurmser was trapped with his army in Mantua; after a negotiated capitulation, Wurmser left the city with his honors and 700 men, and marched back to Vienna. His defeat at Mantua did not diminish the luster of his service in imperial eyes—he was granted another appointment immediately—but he was an old man of 72 years who had spent most of his adult life in arduous campaigning. His health failed him shortly after his appointment and he died in 1797.

== Family and early career ==
Born in Strasbourg, in the French province of Alsace, he was the son of Frantz Jacob Wurmser von Vendenheim. He was christened in the Protestant church of Saint Nicolas and first served in the French Army in 1741 during the early campaigns of the Silesian Wars as a cavalry officer under the command of Marshal Charles, Prince of Soubise. In 1747, he was promoted to Captain of Cavalry.

He married on 25 January 1761 in Vendenheim (Département du Bas-Rhin) Sophia Henrietta Rosina Juliana von und zu der Thann. She died aged 39 in Trautenau (Bohemia) on 27 June 1772 as a consequence of childbirth, and was buried in Michelsdorf (Silesia).

In 1750, when his father left Alsace and became a Habsburg subject, Wurmser too left French service and joined the House of Habsburg military. He brought with him the legions he commanded from France. As part of the imperial Austrian army, he participated in the last years of the continental war, sometimes called the "Little War" because it did not involve three of the five great powers of Europe. In these engagements against the Prussians, he showed exceptional command capabilities and a wily and courageous attitude. On 30 January 1761, Emperor Francis I raised him to comital status of the Holy Roman Empire of the German Nation. Two years later, Francis' brother, Prince Charles Alexander of Lorraine, the Statthalter of the Austrian Netherlands, known as an audacious partisan collected his volunteers—a regiment each of Infantry and Hussars, with an artillery company—and joined Austrian service.

== War of the Bavarian Succession ==
In Spring 1778, Wurmser's 30th Hussars were posted in northern Bohemia, to cover the border with Saxony and Silesia. Friedrich von Nauendorf, the son of the previous Colonel-Proprietor of the Regiment, was a captain in a village outpost, with about 50 Hussars under his command. In early July, the Prussian General Johann Jakob von Wunsch (1717–1788), crossed into Bohemia near the fortified town of Náchod, in the opening action of the War of the Bavarian Succession. Nauendorf led his 50 Hussars to engage Wunsch's considerably larger force. When they encountered Wunch's force, he greeted them as friends; by the time the Prussians realized the allegiance of the Hussars, Nauendorf, and his small force had the upper hand, and Wunsch withdrew. The next day, Nauendorf was promoted to major. As the war evolved over the summer, Wurmser's Hussars covered the left flank of the main army, which was positioned in the entrenched heights above Jaroměř, in a triple line of redoubts extending 15 kilometers (9 mi) along the river to Königgrätz.

In October, Joseph II, Holy Roman Emperor withdrew most of the Imperial army from the Bohemian border, under threat of intervention by Catherine II of Russia; Frederick II of Prussia did the same. A small force of hussars and dragoons remained in Bohemia to provide a winter cordon, designed to prevent Prussian incursions into Bohemia. Appointed to be commander of the winter cordon, Wurmser ordered a small assault column under command of Colonel Wilhelm Klebeck to attack the village of Dittersbach. Klebeck led a column of Croats into the village. During the action, 400 Prussians were killed, another 400 made prisoner, and eight colors were captured. Following his successes against the Prussians in 1778, Joseph awarded him the Knights Cross of the Military Order of Maria Theresa on 21 October 1778.

In another raid, in January 1779, Wurmser advanced into the Grafschaft Glatz in five columns, two of which, commanded by Major General Franz Joseph, Count Kinsky, surrounded Habelschwerdt on 17–18 January. While one column secured the approach, the other, under the leadership of Colonel Pallavicini, stormed the town, captured Major General Adolph, Landgrave of Hesse-Philippsthal-Barchfeld and 714 men, three cannons, and seven colors. Wurmser himself led the third column in an assault on the so-called Swedish blockhouse at Oberschwedeldorf; it and the town of Habelschwerdt were set on fire by howitzers. Major General Ludwig, Baron of Terzi (1730–1800), who was covering with the remaining two columns, threw back the enemy relief and took 300 Prussian prisoners. Meanwhile, Wurmser maintained his position at the nearby village of Rückerts and town Reinerz. His forward patrols reached the outskirts of Glatz, and were able to cover the Silesian borders, almost reaching Schweidnitz. Halberschwerdt and Oberschwedeldorf were both destroyed.

== French Revolutionary Wars ==
Promotions

- Transferred from French service to Austrian military in 1763
- Major General: 1763
- Lt. Field Marshal: 10 October 1778 (effective 10 January 1778)
- General of Cavalry: 8 September 1787 (effective 2 September 1787)
- Field Marshal 11 December 1795

In 1787, Wurmser received a promotion to General der Kavallerie; he held a series of posts in Vienna, Bohemia and Galicia, becoming commanding general at the latter in 1787 during the Austrian War with the Ottoman Empire. While Wurmser fought Austria's battles in the Balkans, in France, a coalition of the clergy and the professional and bourgeoisie class—the First and Third estates—led a call for reform of the French government and the creation of a written constitution. Initially, the rulers of Europe viewed the French Revolution as an event between the French king and his subjects, and not something in which they should interfere. In 1790, Leopold succeeded his brother Joseph as emperor and by 1791, he considered the situation surrounding his sister, Marie Antoinette, and her children, with greater alarm. In August 1791, in consultation with French émigré nobles and Frederick William II of Prussia, he issued the Declaration of Pillnitz, in which they declared the interest of the monarchs of Europe as one with the interests of Louis and his family. They threatened ambiguous but quite serious, consequences if anything should happen to the royal family. The French émigrés continued to agitate for support of a counter-revolution. On 20 April 1792, the French National Convention declared war on Austria. In the War of the First Coalition (1792–1797), France opposed most of the European states sharing land or water borders with her, plus Portugal and the Ottoman Empire.

=== Rhine campaign 1793–1794 ===
From February 1793 to January 1794, Wurmser commanded the Imperial Army of the Rhine. He commanded the successful storming of the Lauterburg and Weissenburg lines on 13 October 1793. The Lines, a series of earthworks on the south side of the Lauter river, a tributary of the Rhine river in Alsace-Lorraine, offered a major strategic defensive position for the French.

Part of France's Army of the Vosges, under the general command of Jean Victor Moreau, manned the French position. The three battalions and six squadrons, commanded by General of Brigade Illier, held the position with ten artillery pieces. The French defensive line ran west from Lauterbourg on the Rhine to Saarbrücken. The western part of this line, from Lauterbourg to Wissembourg, was protected by the Lines of Wissembourg, a series of fortifications built nearly a century earlier to protect Alsace from invasion along the flat plain between the Vosges and the Rhine. The Army of the Rhine defended these Lines. The Army of the Rhine also was at Saarbrücken and the Corps of the Vosges linked the two, with camps at Hornbach and Kettrick.

On 20 August, Wurmser directed the 4th Allied Column, and Field Marshal Kavanagh's Hessen and Austrian troops, augmented by a battalion of Emigre troops, to assault part of the works; Kavanagh's attack successfully ousted the French from the position; General Illier was killed by a Hessen Jäger. An unknown number of the 3,000 French defenders were killed or wounded; three officers and 100 men were captured. The testing for the Weissembourg Lines continued for the next 45 days, Each skirmish, each probe, tested the French strength and resolve. In mid-September the Prussians successfully defeated a French assault on Pirmasens, a small fortification to the north and east; this success encouraged the Austrian and Prussian alliance to venture a major assault on the French defenses.

Field Armies Commanded by Wurmser

- Army of the Rhine February 1793–January 1794
- Army of the Upper Rhine, August 1795–June 1796
- Army of Italy, June 1796–September 1796
- Commanding General, Galicia, September 1796 – 1797

Wurmser's force of 33,599 infantry and 9,635 cavalries had whittled away at the Lines, skirmishing throughout August and September with French infantry and cavalry, which always withdrew to the superior defensive position behind the earthen works. While the Prussians marched around the lines, from Pirmasens, Wurmser organized his force into seven columns, and they assaulted the Lines in waves. In the First Battle of Wissembourg on 13 September the French defenses were successfully breached.

Two months later, the French committed major forces to recover the Lines. Wurmser commanded the Austrian contingent at the defeat at the Second Battle of Wissembourg on 26 December 1793.

=== Upper Rhine campaign ===
From August 1795 to June 1796, Wurmser commanded the Army of the Upper Rhine.

== Campaign in northern Italy ==
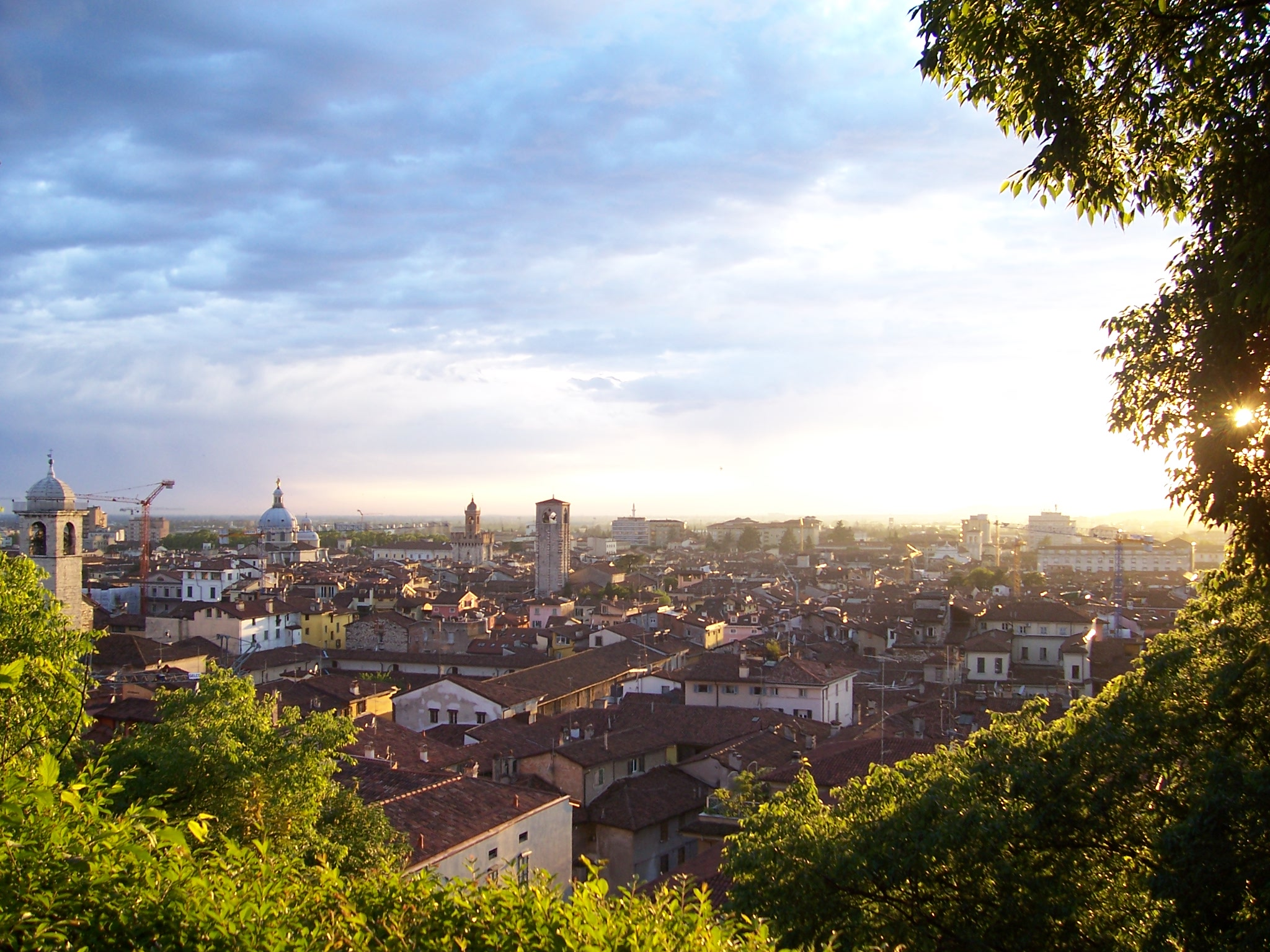
Klenau approached the town of Brescia at night, surprising the garrison, and taking as his prisoners three officials of the French Directory.

In 1796, Wurmser descended into northern Italy, with 25,000 men from his old Army of the Rhine, to unite with Beaulieu's battered army of northern Italy. The two armies met at Trent and marched to Mantua in three columns.

Wurmser's columns scored some initial successes. The forward column, under command of under Peter Quasdanovich moved toward Lake Garda, and a small reconnaissance force under Johann von Klenau advanced from the alps on the city of Brescia; there, they found the local French garrison unprepared. At midnight, Klenau led two squadrons of the Wurmser 8th Hussar Regiment and several other battalions and squadrons in an attack on the French garrison. They captured 600–700 French soldiers stationed there and three officials of the French Directory: Jean Lannes, Joachim Murat, and François Étienne de Kellermann. Quasdanovich managed to occupy Lonato.

Wurmser did not count on swift movement by the French. Within two days, Klenau's force retreated in the face of Napoleon Bonaparte and 12,000 Frenchmen; his small advance guard was quickly pushed out of Brescia on 1 August. At the subsequent Battle of Lonato of 2–3 August 1796, the French also forced Quasdanovich's column to withdraw into the mountains, with heavy losses. The mopping up operations lasted until mid-August, isolated Quasdanovich's force by Lake Garda, and freed the French to concentrate on Wurmser's main force at Castiglione delle Stiviere, further south; Bonaparte's subsequent victory against Wurmser at the Battle of Castiglione forced the old commander across the Mincio river and allowed the French to return to the siege of Mantua.

The resumed siege was not without its problems. To move swiftly against Wurmser, Napoleon had abandoned his all his siege equipment, leaving it at Mantua. When he resumed the siege, it was much less effective without his guns. Furthermore, by early September, many of the scattered Austrian units had rejoined Wurmser's column. Even so, at the Battle of Bassano on 8 September, the Austrians were outnumbered almost two to one by the French. As the Austrian army retreated, Bonaparte ordered a pursuit that caused the Austrians to abandon their artillery and baggage. Most of the third battalion of the 59th Jordis, and the first battalion of the Border Infantry Banat were captured and these units ceased to exist after this battle. The Austrians lost 600 killed and wounded, and 2,000 captured, plus lost 30 guns, eight colors, and 200 limbers and ammunition wagons. Wurmser's column fought its way to besieged Mantua, but emerged suddenly, in an effort to escape, at the Battle of La Favorita near there on 15 September. This was the second attempt to relieve the fortress; as the Austrians withdrew from the battle, they retreated into Mantua itself, and from 15 September until 2 February 1797, Wurmser was trapped inside the fortress while the city was besieged.

Following the Austrian loss at the Battle of Rivoli, 48 kilometers (30 mi) north of Mantua, on 14–15 January 1797, when clearly there would be no Austrian relief for Mantua, Wurmser sent one of his juniors, Johann von Klenau, to negotiate conditions of surrender with French General Jean Sérurier, Additional evidence suggests that Bonaparte was present and dictated far more generous terms than the Austrians had expected. Wurmser, who Napoleon held in high esteem, left Mantua with his men and officers, and his battle honors, and marched back to Austrian lands.

== Legacy ==
Of all the field marshals in Habsburg service during the French Revolutionary and Napoleonic Wars, Wurmser was recognized among the best. Some historians attribute Austrian problems to its aging general staff, compared to the relatively young general staff of the French Empire. For instance, Wurmser was 72, approaching 73 in the 1796 campaign, and Peter Vitus von Quasdanovich (b. 1738) was nearing 60. Besides the graying general staff, there were also youngsters, and these demonstrated acute military acumen: Archduke Charles was 26 years old in the 1796 campaign and had been tutored by Hohenlohe-Kirchberg and Wurmser; Schwarzenberg was also young, under 30; Johann von Klenau, at 31, was the youngest field Marshal in the Habsburg military; and there were many others. But Wurmser may have been hampered more by the Aulic Council than by his age; Digby Smith points out that he descended into Italy fettered with a new and inexperienced chief of staff sent to him by the Council with battle plans and instructions in writing. These restricted his movements in Italy and prevented him from responding to targets of opportunity.

Broken in health, a knight without fear and above reproach, Wurmser died in Vienna the following summer.

== See also ==
- Joseph Alvinczy
- Peter Quasdanovich
- Paul Davidovich

== Sources ==
=== References ===
- Ashton, John. English caricature and satire on Napoleon I. London: Chatto & Windus, 1888.
- Boycott-Brown, Martin. The Road to Rivoli. London: Cassell & Co., 2001. ISBN 0-304-35305-1
- Carlyle, Thomas. History of Friedrich II of Prussia called Frederick the great : in eight volumes. Vol. VIII in The works of Thomas Carlyle in thirty volumes. London: Chapman and Hall, 1896–1899.
- (in German) Criste, Oscar. Dagobert Sigmund von Wurmser. Allgemeine Deutsche Biographie. Herausgegeben von der Historischen Kommission bei der Bayerischen Akademie der Wissenschaften, Band 44 (1898), S. 338–340, Digitale Volltext-Ausgabe in Wikisource. (Version vom 24. März 2010, 13:18 Uhr UTC).
- (in German) Ebert, Jens-Florian. "Nauendorf, Friedrich August Graf." Die Österreichischen Generäle 1792–1815. Accessed 15 October 2009.
- (in German) Hirtenfeld, Jaromir. Der militär-Maria-Theresien-Orden und seine Mitglieder: nach authentischen Quellen bearbeitet. Wien: Hofdruckerei, 1857.
- McLynn, Frank. Napoleon: A Biography. New York: Arcade, 2002, ISBN 978-1-55970-631-5.
- Rickard, J. Storming of the lines of Wissembourg, 13 October 1793. In History of War. Peter D Antill, Tristan Dugdale-Pointon, and John Rickard, editors. 9 February 2009. Accessed 23 March 2010.
- Smith, Digby. Klebeck. Leonard Kudrna and Dibgy Smith, compilers. A biographical dictionary of all Austrian Generals in the French Revolutionary and Napoleonic Wars, 1792–1815. Napoleon Series. Robert Burnham, Editor in Chief. April 2008. Accessed 22 March 2010.
- (in German) Wurzbach, C., von. Biographisches Lexikon des Kaiserthums Österreich. Vienna, 1856–91, vol 20, 59.

Military offices
Preceded by Karl von Nauendorf	Proprietor (Inhaber); Hussar Regiment No. 30 (formerly No.8); 1775–1797	Succeeded by Friedrich Joseph, Count of Nauendorf
