= Hyacinthe François Joseph Despinoy =

French Revolutionary War general

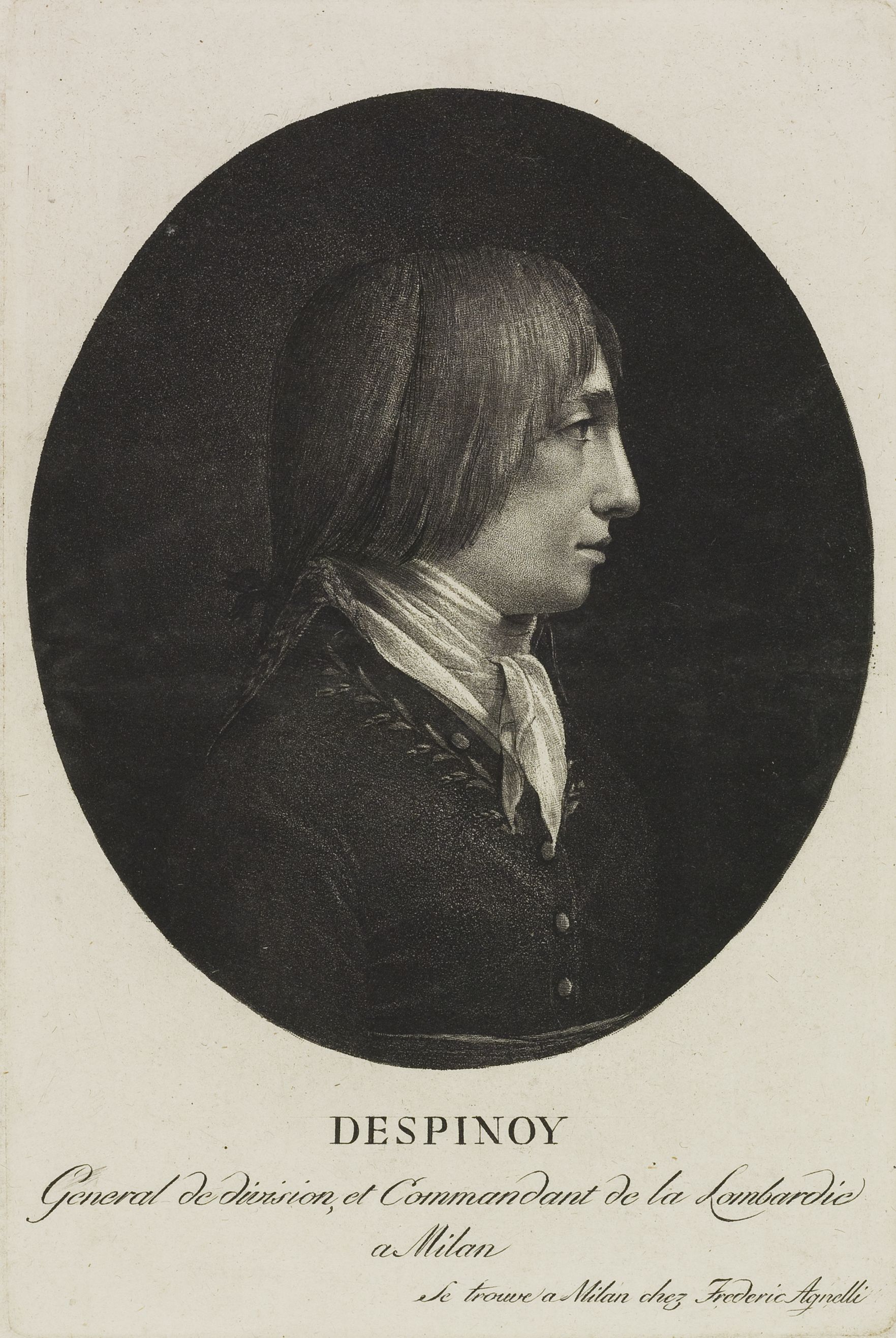
Despinoy

Hyacinthe François Joseph Despinoy or Despinois (22 May 1764 – 29 December 1848) became a French general during the French Revolutionary Wars, but Napoleon Bonaparte removed him from command. Afterward he held minor positions.

== Early career ==
Born in Valenciennes, Despinoy joined the French royal army in July 1780 as a gentleman-cadet in the Barrois Regiment (later the 50th Line Infantry). Promoted to sous-lieutenant in 1784 and lieutenant in 1791, he was a captain of grenadiers in 1792 when the War of the First Coalition broke out. He quickly rose in rank to chef de battalion in 1793 and fought in several minor actions.

During the Siege of Toulon, Despinoy served as chief of staff to General Jacques François Dugommier. He received promotion to general of brigade after being severely wounded during the siege. He was posted to the Army of the Eastern Pyrenees where he distinguished himself at the siege of Collioure. In November 1794 he presented the captured Spanish flags to the Convention and gave a stirring speech. He was later captured at Puycerda but freed at the Peace of Basle in 1795.

== Under Bonaparte ==
In 1796, Despinoy joined Bonaparte's Army of Italy and fought at the Battle of Mondovì. Promoted to general of division in June 1796, he directed the siege of the citadel of Milan until its surrender. Bonaparte removed him from the command of his division "for refusing to engage the Austrians on 3 August" during the Battle of Lonato. On 14 August 1796, Bonaparte wrote of him,

Without energy or audacity. Is not a natural soldier, is not loved by his men, does not lead them into action. Has high principles, a good mind, sound political views. A good commander in the interior."

Despinoy later served as governor of the fortresses of Perpignan in 1801 and Alessandria from 1803 to 1814. He was named a commandant of the Legion d'honneur but never again entrusted with a combat command.

== Bourbons ==
King Louis XVIII named Despinoy commander of the 1st military division in January 1816 and shortly after he was ennobled as a Count. After commanding other interior posts, he led the 12th military division at Nantes where he resisted the Revolution of 1830. He was arrested and retired from duty. He died in 1848.
