= Gavardo =

Gavardo Gaàrt
- Comune
- Comune di Gavardo
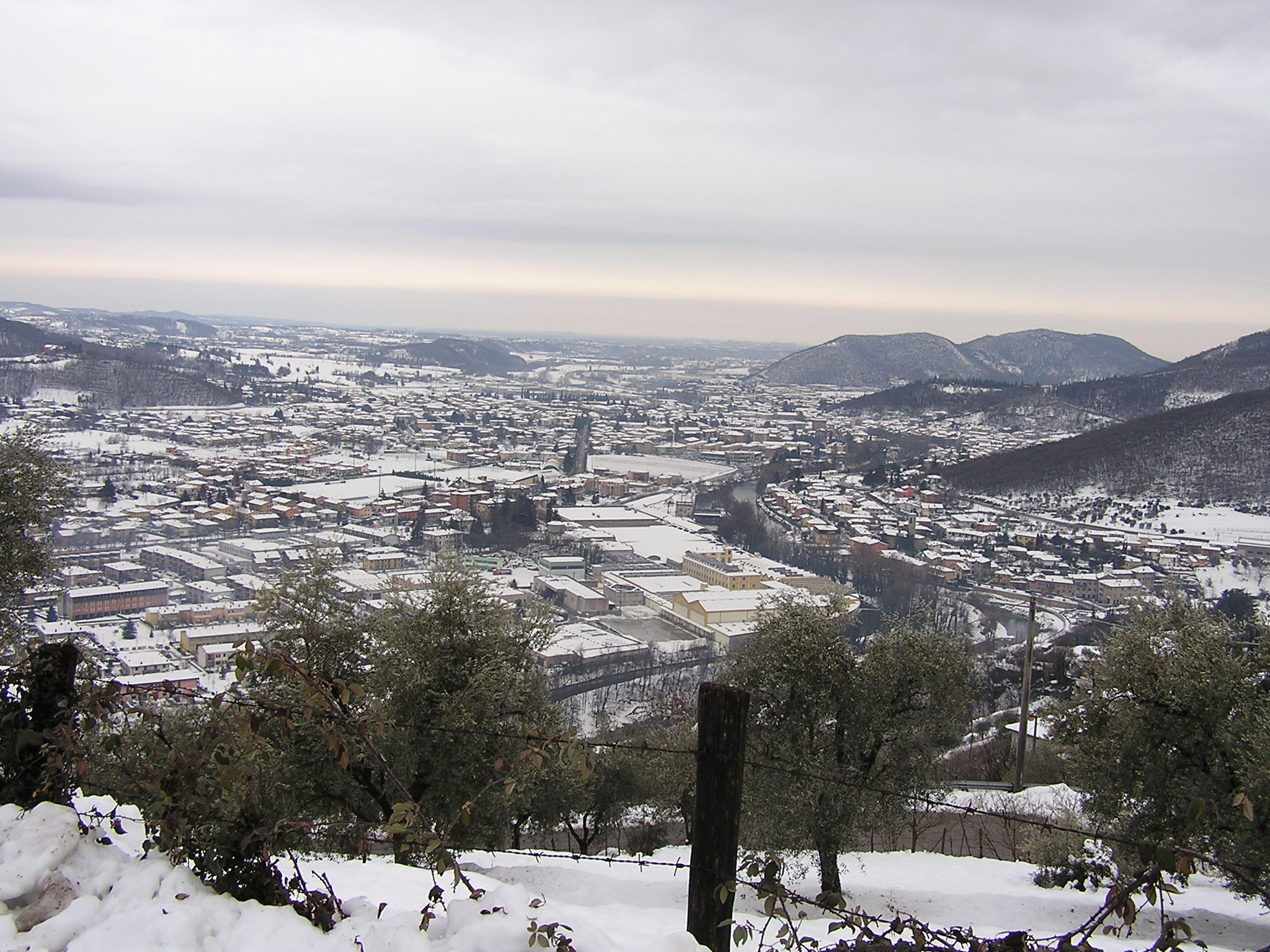
- Gavardo in winter

- Location within Italy Location within Lombardy
- Coordinates: 45°35′15″N 10°26′20″E
- Country: Italy
- Region: Lombardy
- Province: Brescia (BS)
- Frazioni: Limone, Sopraponte, Soprazzocco

Area
  - Total: 29.508 km^{2} (11.393 sq mi)
- Elevation: 199 m (653 ft)

Population (31 December 2011)
  - Total: 11,786
  - Density: 399.42/km^{2} (1,034.5/sq mi)
- Demonym: Gavardesi
- Time zone: UTC+1 (CET)
  - Summer (DST): UTC+2 (CEST)
- Postal code: 25085
- Dialing code: 0365
- ISTAT code: 017077
- Patron saint: San Filippo and Giacomo il Minore
- Saint day: 3 May
- Website: Official website

Gavardo (Brescian: Gaàrt) is a city and comune in the province of Brescia, in Lombardy. As of 2011 Gavardo had a population of 11,786.

Cyclist Marco Frapporti and Italian football striker Cristiana Girelli were born here.

== Location ==
Gavardo, located in the lower Valle Sabbia northeast of Brescia, is the most populous town in the area. Characterized by a hilly landscape surrounded by mountains and crossed by the Chiese and Naviglio Grande Bresciano rivers. Elevation is approximately 199 m a.s.l., with the lowest point at 188 m and the highest at 877 m a.s.l. Most of the urban settlement is located along the plain surrounding the Chiese River, while a few small hamlets are located on the surrounding reliefs.

== History ==
Gavardo is at just 9 km from Lake Garda and is a renowned wool production center. The name has a Celtic origin and means "river". In its territory ancient Neolithic settlements are evidenced by documents, while in the Middle Ages it was an important commercial and pilgrimage centre under the control of Abbey of Leno at first, then ceded to the bishops of Brescia.

Archaeological evidence shows Neolithic and later prehistoric settlement in the area of the Valle Sabbia, including the Gavardo area. Museo Archeologico della Valle Sabbia displays finds from the Paleolithic, Mesolithic, Neolithic, Bronze and Iron Ages

=== Bombardment of the Gavardo ===
On 29 January 1945 about 13:29 local time, eight Allied aircraft (P-47D Thunderbolts) attacked the town of Gavardo in the Province of Brescia, Lombardy, Italy. The target was a bridge across the river Chiese and the “Naviglio” canal, used by Axis forces to move heavy vehicles. The bombs missed the bridge but struck an entire central block in the historic town center, killing around 52 civilians (some sources say 51) and injuring over 100. The raid is noted as the third deadliest air-raid in the province of Brescia during WWII.The town commemorates the event annually; exhibitions and memorial initiatives are held to remember the victims.
