= Vanderlyn =

Vanderlyn is a surname. Notable people with the surname include:

- John Vanderlyn (1775–1852), American painter
- Pieter Vanderlyn (c. 1687–1778), American painter
