= Jane McCrea =

American woman killed by Native American warrior during Revolutionary War

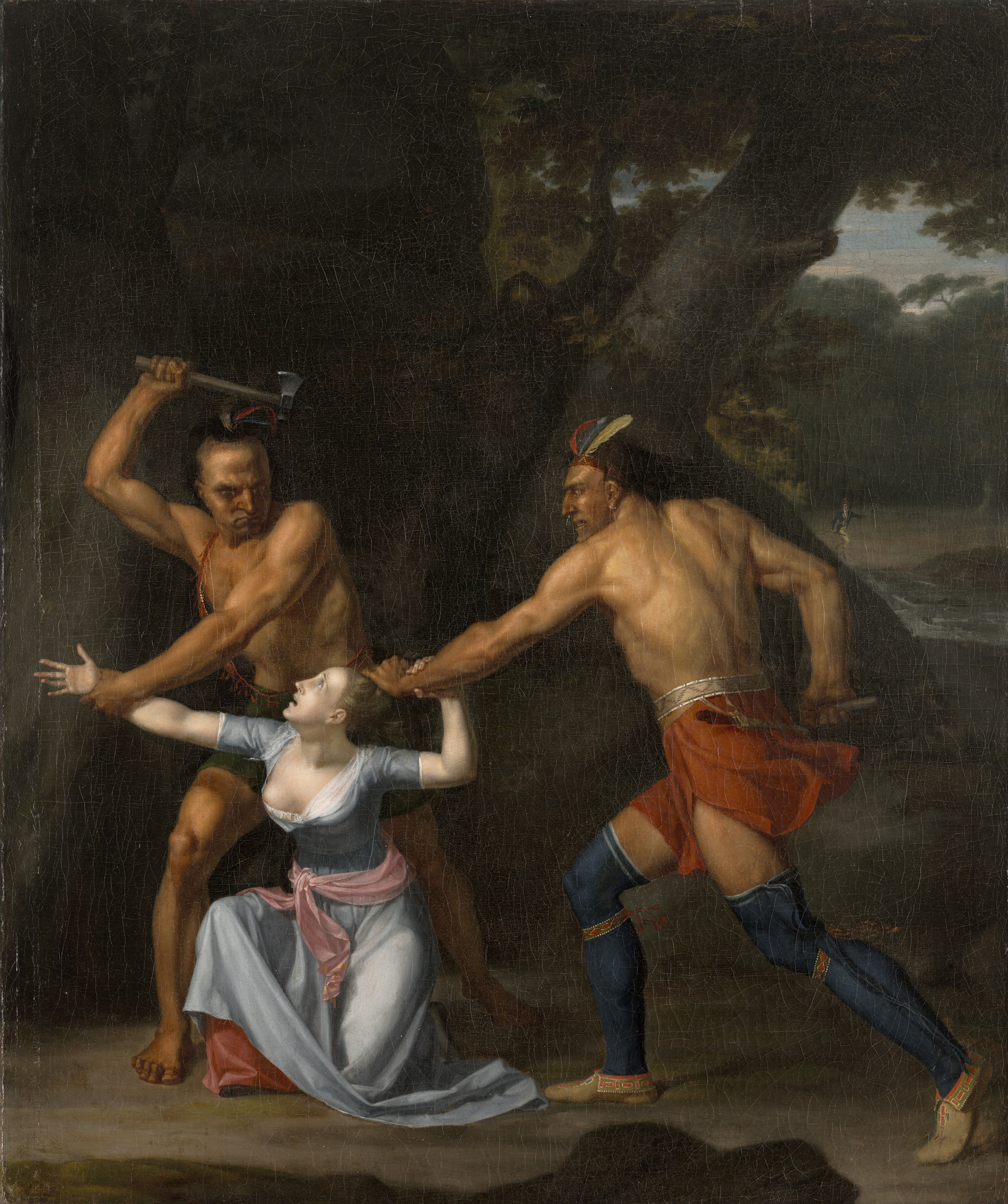
- The Death of Jane McCrea by John Vanderlyn, 1804
- Born: c. 1752; Bedminster, New Jersey
- Died: 27 July 1777 (aged 24–25); New York

Jane McCrea (Note: Sometimes spelled as McCrae or MacCrae.) (c. 1752 – July 27, 1777) was an American woman who was killed by a Native American warrior serving alongside a British Army expedition under the command of John Burgoyne during the American Revolutionary War. Engaged to David Jones, a Loyalist officer serving under Burgoyne, her death led to widespread outrage in the Thirteen Colonies and was used by American Patriots as part of their anti-British propaganda campaign.

Born in Bedminster, New Jersey, McCrea moved to Saratoga, New York where she became engaged to Jones. When the Revolutionary War broke out, Jones fled to Quebec while McCrea's brothers divided their loyalties between the British and the Patriots. During the Saratoga campaign of 1777, McCrea left her brother's home to join Jones who was stationed in Fort Ticonderoga. While staying at Fort Edward, McCrea was abducted, killed and scalped by a group of Native American warriors.

Upon receiving word of the incident, Burgoyne attempted to punish the culprit but was dissuaded from doing so. Her death was widely reported on throughout the Thirteen Colonies; historians and journalists frequently embellished the incident. The killing of McCrea also inspired American resistance to the British, contributing to the failure of the Saratoga campaign. McCrea's life and death eventually became part of American folklore, with pantomimes, poems, folk songs and novels being written about her. Her body has been exhumed numerous times since her death.

== Life ==
Jane McCrea was born in c. 1752 in Bedminster, New Jersey, one of the younger children in the large family of Rev. James McCrea. After her mother died and her father remarried, McCrea moved in with her brother John who lived near Saratoga, New York, where she eventually became engaged to David Jones. Following the outbreak of the American Revolutionary War in 1775, two of her brothers joined the Continental Army and three others became Loyalists, while Jones fled to the British Province of Quebec. During the summer of 1777, as a British-led expedition under Lieutenant-general John Burgoyne neared the Hudson River, John was appointed as the colonel of the 13th Albany County Militia Regiment. Jones, on the other hand, was part of Burgoyne's army as a lieutenant in the King's Royal Regiment of New York and was stationed at Fort Ticonderoga after the British captured it from the Americans in July 1777.

Around the same time, McCrea left John's home to join Jones at Fort Ticonderoga. She eventually reached Fort Edward in July 1777. McCrea stayed at the home of Sara McNeil, a Loyalist who was a cousin of British Brigadier-general Simon Fraser of Balnain. On the morning of July 27, a group of British-allied Indian warriors led by a Wyandot warrior known as Le Loup or Wyandot Panther killed a family of American settlers before killing Lieutenant Tobias Van Vechten of the 13th Regiment and four others in the vicinity of Fort Edward. What happened next is the subject of dispute; what is known is that McCrea and McNeil were abducted by the warriors and separated. McNeil was eventually taken to Burgoyne's camp, where either she or Jones recognized McCrea's supposedly distinctive scalp being carried by a Native American warrior.

One account of McCrea's death was given by the British explorer Thomas Anburey. Anburey claimed that two Indian warriors, one of them Le Loup, were escorting McCrea to Burgoyne's camp when they started to quarrel over an expected reward for bringing her there. One of the pair then killed and scalped her, and Le Loup ended up with the scalp. Anburey also claimed that she was taken against her will, though he noted that there were also rumours that she was being escorted at Jone's request. A second account of her death, given by Le Loup while he was questioned by the British, was that McCrea was accidentally killed by the American garrison at Fort Edward while they were shooting at the retreating warriors. The historian James Phinney Baxter supported the second account in his work The British Invasion from the North (1887) where he asserted that an exhumation of her body revealed only bullet wounds and no tomahawk wounds. A group of Salem historians wrote in 1896 that "Jane McCrea made her visit to Mrs. McNeill, of Fort Edward. While at the home of Mrs. McNeill the house was attacked by a band of Indians. Jane and Mrs. McNeill were violently seized and carried off, Jane being placed upon a horse, Mrs. McNeill being dragged along on foot. The Indians were hotly pursued by a band of Americans from the fort, who occasionally discharged their rifles at the fleeing fugitives. Jane was shot through the body by one of these stray bullets, and, falling from her horse, she was scalped by one of her captors and left dead upon the ground." McCrea's death was also reported by the American surgeon John Bartlett, who claimed McCrea and McNeil were taken by the warriors to Burgoyne's camp, where McCrea was shot and scalped.

== Reaction to McCrea's death ==
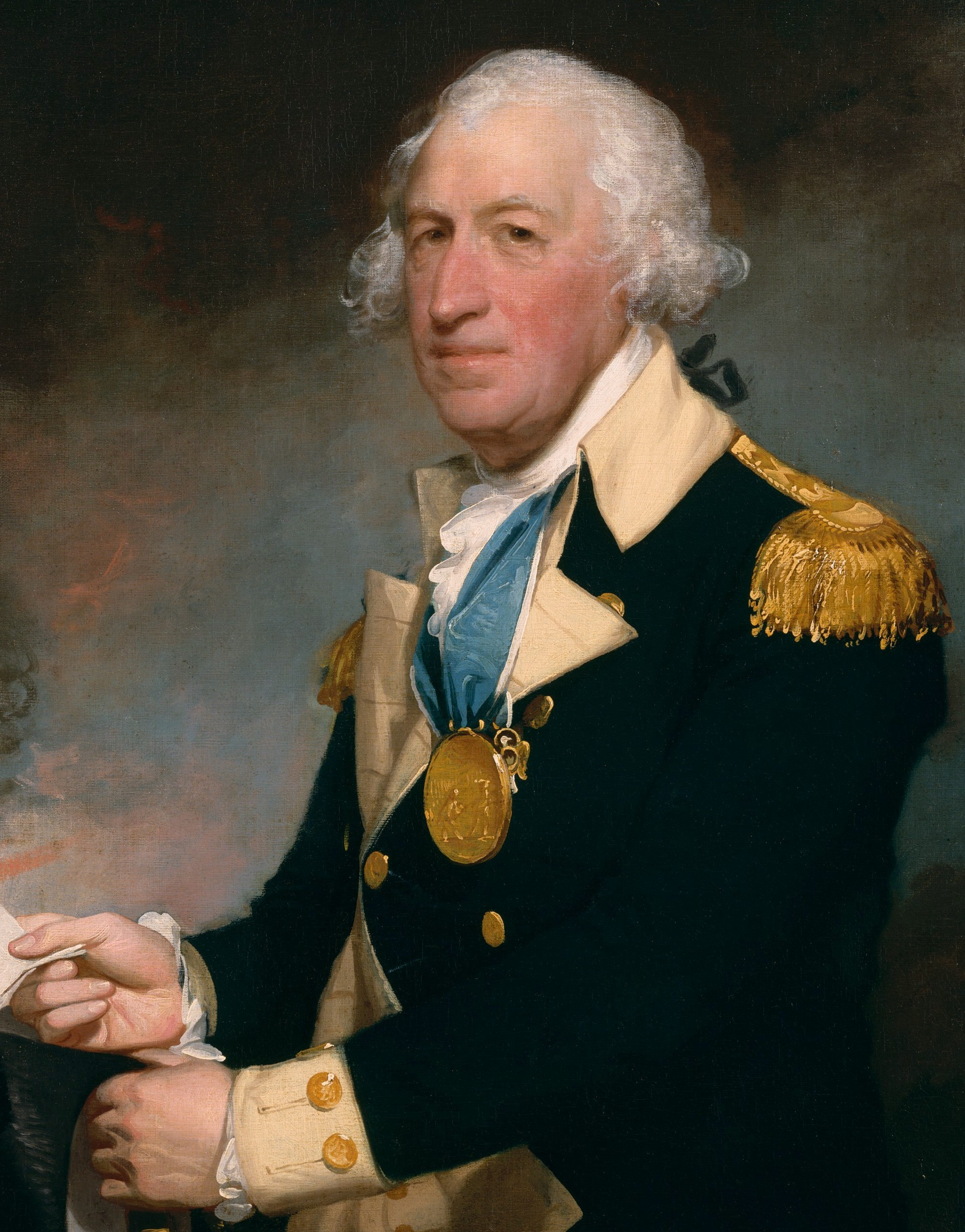
Portrait of Horatio Gates by Gilbert Stuart. Horatio Gates' response to a letter from Burgoyne, which mentioned McCrea's death, was "widely reprinted".

When Burgoyne received news of McCrea's death, he went to the camp of Native American warriors accompanying his expedition and ordered that the culprit be delivered to him, threatening to have him executed. Simon Fraser and interpreter Luc de la Corne informed Burgoyne that such an act would result in the defection of all Native American warriors from his expedition and might lead them to take revenge as they travelled back north. Burgoyne relented, and no action was taken against the Native Americans with regards to this incident.

Although McCrea had been a loyalist, and was believed to have been killed by a loyalist warrior, the murder and mutilation of an American young woman inflamed both outrage and anxiety among the colonialist population. News of McCrea's death travelled relatively quickly around the Thirteen Colonies by the standards of the time. News accounts of her death were published in Pennsylvania on August 11 and as far away as Virginia on August 22. The accounts of her death become increasingly exaggerated as they travelled, claiming that indiscriminate massacres of Loyalists and Patriots were being perpetrated by Native Americans. Burgoyne's campaign had intended to use Native Americans as a means to intimidate the colonists; however, the American reaction to the news was not what he had hoped for. Patriot propaganda efforts received a boost after Burgoyne wrote a letter to Continental Army officer Horatio Gates, complaining about the American treatment of prisoners of war captured at the Battle of Bennington on August 17. Gates' response was widely reprinted:

That the savages of America should in their warfare mangle and scalp the unhappy prisoners who fall into their hands is neither new nor extraordinary; but that the famous Lieutenant General Burgoyne, in whom the fine gentleman is united with the soldier and the scholar, should hire the savages of America to scalp europeans and the descendants of europeans, nay more, that he should pay a price for each scalp so barbarously taken, is more than will be believed in England. [...] Miss McCrae, a young lady lovely to the sight, of virtuous character and amiable disposition, engaged to be married to an officer of your army, was [...] carried into the woods, and there scalped and mangled in the most shocking manner [...]

News accounts of her death elaborated on McCrea's supposed beauty, describing her as "lovely in disposition, so graceful in manners and so intelligent in features, that she was a favorite of all who knew her", and that her hair "was of extraordinary length and beauty, measuring a yard and a quarter". One of the few contemporary accounts of the incident by someone who actually saw her personally was that of James Wilkinson, who described her as "a country girl of honest family in circumstances of mediocrity, without either beauty or accomplishments". Later accounts frequently embellished details. For example, historian Richard Ketchum notes that the color of her hair has been described as everything from black to blonde to red; he also cited an 1840s examination of an alleged lock of her hair that described it as "reddish".

Her death, and those of others in similar raids, inspired American resistance to Burgoyne's expedition, contributing to his defeat at the battles of Saratoga. The effect expanded as reports of the incident were used as propaganda to excite Patriot sympathies later in the war, especially before the 1779 Sullivan Expedition. David Jones, apparently bitter over the incident, never married and settled in British North America as a United Empire Loyalist.

The story eventually became a part of American folklore. An anonymous poet wrote "The Ballad of Jane McCrea", which was set to music and became a popular folk song. In Philadelphia in 1799, Ricketts' Circus performed "The Death of Miss McCrea", a pantomime co-written by John Durang. Artist John Vanderlyn painted The Death of Jane McCrea a depiction of her murder and exhibited it at the Salon of 1804 in Paris. There are several markers in and near Fort Edward commemorating her death.

== Exhumations ==
McCrea's remains have been moved three times. The first time was in 1822, and the second was in 1852, when they were moved to the Union Cemetery in Fort Edward. Her body was exhumed again in 2003 in hopes of solving the mystery of how she died. Unexpectedly, two bodies—those of McCrea and Sara McNeil—were found in the grave. The 1822 move had placed McCrea's remains atop the burial vault of McNeil (who died in 1799 of natural causes). Both skeletons were largely complete, though McCrea's skull was missing, possibly due to reported grave robberies in the 19th century. The bodies were exhumed again in 2005 for further analysis, and were subsequently reburied in separate graves.
