= Self-Portrait (Vanderlyn) =

Painting by John Vanderlyn

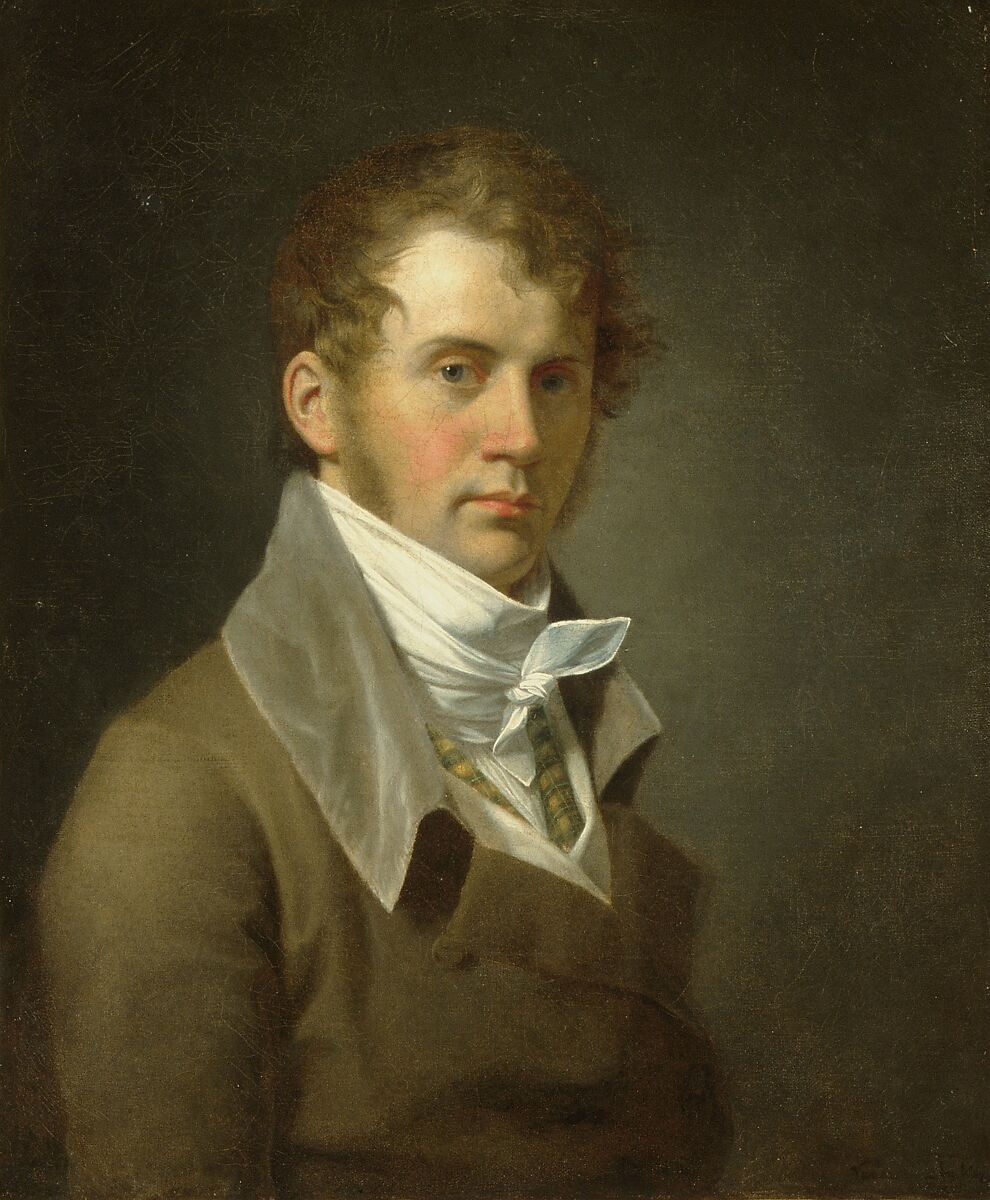
- Artist: John Vanderlyn
- Year: 1800
- Type: Oil on canvas, portrait painting
- Dimensions: 64.1 cm × 53 cm (25.2 in × 21 in)
- Location: Metropolitan Museum of Art; New York City

A self-portrait of 1800 by the American artist John Vanderlyn is now in the Metropolitan Museum of Art in New York City. It is an oil painting showing the artist around the age of twenty four. He had moved to Paris and studied under François-André Vincent. The painting was one of two portraits that Vanderlyn exhibited at the Salon of 1800 at the Louvre. It was particularly praised by Jacques-Louis David whose Neoclassicism was a major influence on Vanderlyn. He presented the painting to his patron Aaron Burr, a politician who served as Vice President, best known for his duel with Alexander Hamilton.

Four years later he enjoyed success with his history painting The Death of Jane McCrea. He was later commissioned to produce the large Landing of Columbus for the Capitol Rotunda in Washington.

== Bibliography ==
- Boime, Albert. A Social History of Modern Art, Volume 2: Art in an Age of Bonapartism, 1800-1815. University of Chicago Press, 1993.
- Caldwell, John & Roque, Oswaldo Rodriguez. American Paintings in The Metropolitan Museum of Art. Vol. 1: A Catalogue of Works by Artists Born by 1815. Metropolitan Museum of Art, 1994.
- Merrill, Jane & Endicott, John. Aaron Burr in Exile: A Pariah in Paris, 1810-1811. McFarland, 2016.
