= Henry Van Der Lyn =

American lawyer

Henry Vanderlyn
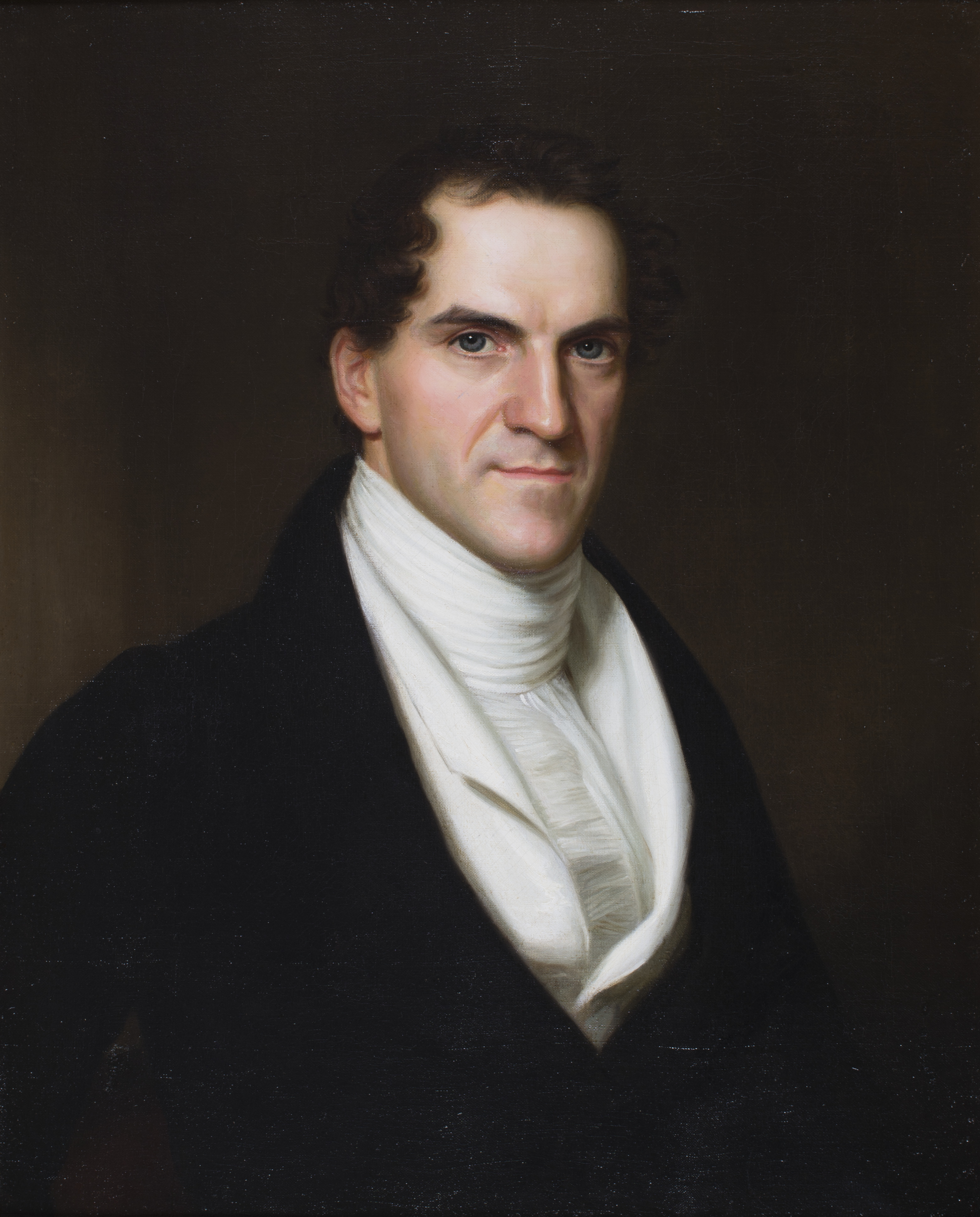
- Portrait by John Vanderlyn, 1815
- Born: April 24, 1784; Kingston, New York
- Died: October 1, 1865 (aged 81)
- Known for: Painting

Henry Van Der Lyn or Henry Vanderlyn (hen'ree văn'durlin) (April 24, 1784 – October 1, 1865) was a 19th-century American lawyer from Oxford, New York. He was best known for the diaries he kept over a thirty-year period, from April 1827 and March 1857.

== Early life and education ==
Henry Vanderlyn was the grandson of Pieter Vanderlyn (c.1687–1778) an American colonial painter born in Holland who settled in Kingston, New York. Henry was the brother of John Vanderlyn (1775–1852) a well known Neoclassical painter.

Vanderlyn moved to Oxford in 1806 and established a law practice after earning his bachelor's degree at Union College and serving in a New York City law office where he was admitted to the Bar association.

Vanderlyn was a very popular person in Oxford for his genial personality and his generous support of the Oxford Academy School.

== Writing ==
He made daily notes on life in Oxford and kept a diary of local and personal events. This diary is a window into the formative years in Chenango County, New York during the first half of the 19th century.

One of the Oxford Historical Society museum's most prized items is a set of six volumes of these diaries covering the years 1827-1853. The original handwritten diary is in the New York State Historical Society.
