= Patroon painters =

Group of painters in 18th-century New York

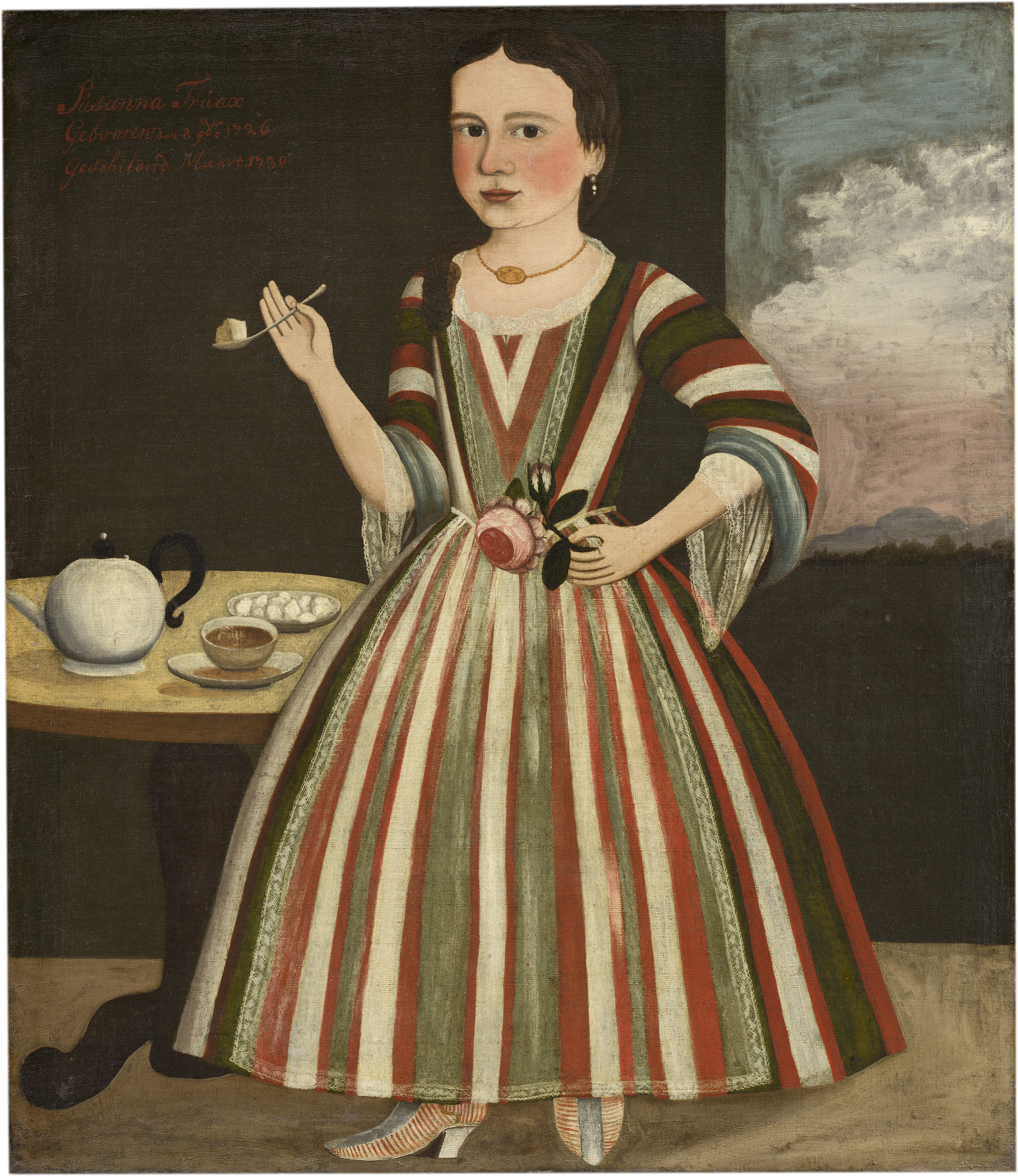
Susanna Truax (1730), attributed to either Pieter Vanderlyn or the "Gansevoort Limner".

The patroon painters were a group of painters active in what is now New York State in the early 18th century. There were between six and seven patroon painters. Baigell describes the patroon style as "a manner notable for marvelous flat-patterned clothing enlivened by assertive diagonals and vertical, broad curving planes, and simple color combinations". The patroon painters are sometimes described as the first American school of art.

Named after the patroons, a Dutch landowning class, the painters were active in the Hudson Valley, in cities including Schenectady, Albany, and Kingston, from roughly 1700 to 1750. The historian James Thomas Flexner coined the term "patroon painter" in his 1945 study First Flowers of Our Wilderness, the first volume of a history of American painting. The earliest painting identified as a patroon painting is dated to 1718.

Some patroon paintings are thought to be the work of Pieter Vanderlyn, and another painter named the "Gansevoort Limner" has also been identified with the school. (The Gansevoort Limner, in turn, is sometimes identified with Vanderlyn.) Patroon painters are known mainly for portraits. Ruby notes that patroon painting is often thought to be influenced by English portrait painting—itself influenced by earlier Dutch antecedents.

== Sources ==
- Ebert, John; Ebert, Katherine (1975). American Folk Painters. Charles Scribner's Sons. ISBN 0-684-14339-9. OCLC 1324450.
- Vlach, John Michael (1988). Plain Painters: Making Sense of American Folk Art. Smithsonian Institution. ISBN 0-87474-925-5. OCLC 17479222.
- Ruby, Louisa Wood (January 29, 2008). "Dutch Art and the Hudson Valley Patroon Painters". In Goodfriend, Joyce; Schmidt, Benjamin; Stott, Annette (eds.). Going Dutch: The Dutch Presence in America, 1609–2009. Brill. pp. 25–57. doi:10.1163/ej.9789004163683.i-367.10. ISBN 978-90-474-3222-7.
