= Salon of 1800 =

1800 art exhibition in Paris

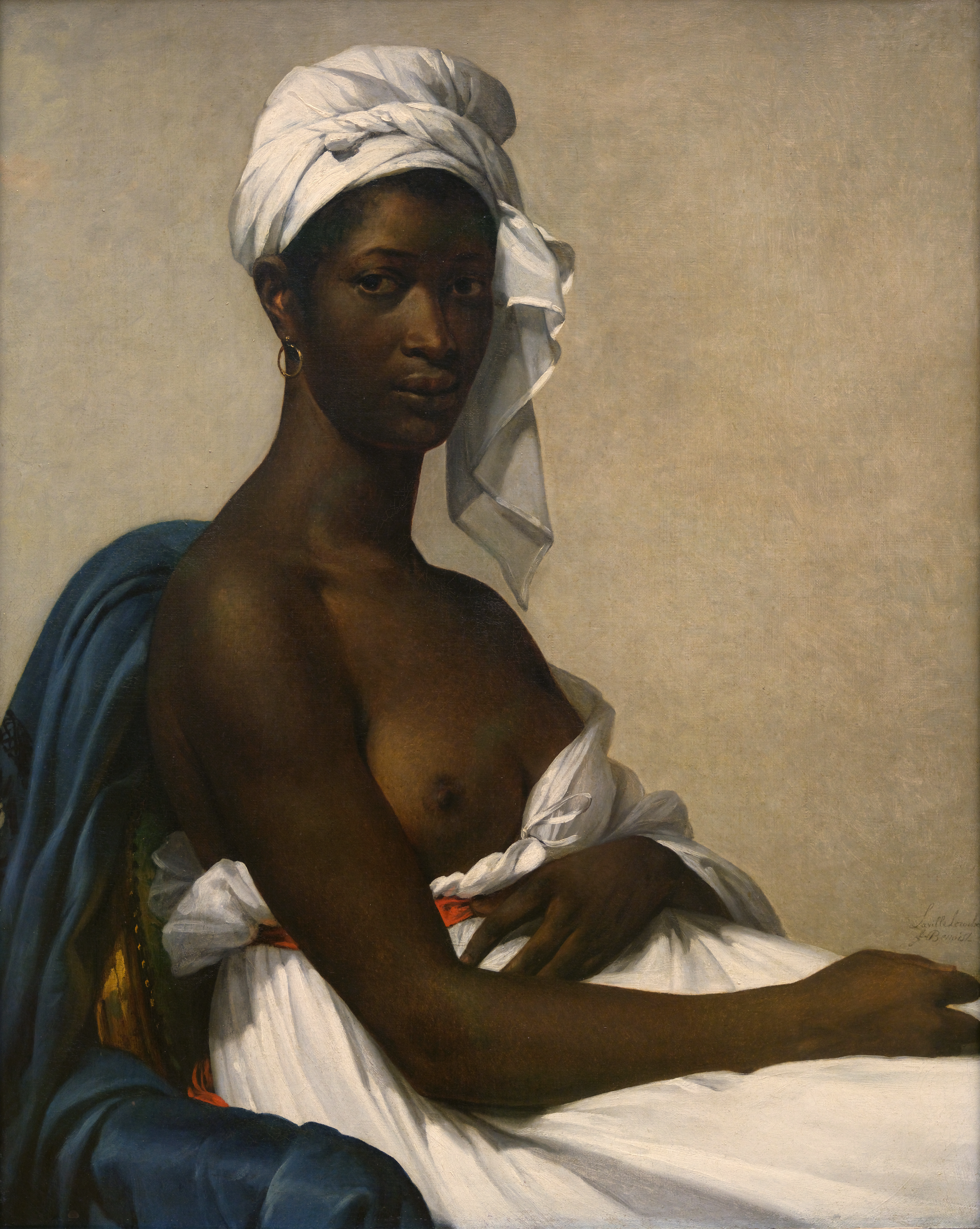
Portrait of Madeleine by Marie-Guillemine Benoist

The Salon of 1800 was an art exhibition held at the Louvre in Paris, opening on 2 September 1800. It was the first Salon to take place following the Coup of 18 Brumaire that brought Napoleon Bonaparte to power on 9 November 1799. It followed on from the Salon of 1799.

John Vanderlyn became the first American ever to exhibit at the Salon, displaying two portraits. One of these was a Self-Portrait which belonged to his patron Aaron Burr. Charles Meynier showed part of his series of depictions of the Ancient Greek muses with Apollo. He also displayed his history painting Telemachus, Urged by Mentor, Leaving the Island of Calypso. Marie-Guillemine Benoist submitted her Portrait of Madeleine establishing the artist's reputation. Louis-Léopold Boilly exhibited a Trompe-l'œil, the first time the term had been used. He also showed several portraits, a significant shift in his artistic career from his earlier boudoir scenes.

In sculpture Charles-Louis Corbet produced a marble bust of General Bonaparte. However, one of the most-admired works of the Salon was François Gérard's portrait of Bonaparte's rival Jean Victor Marie Moreau who went on to win the Battle of Hohenlinden in December of the same year. It was followed by the Salon of 1801

== Gallery ==
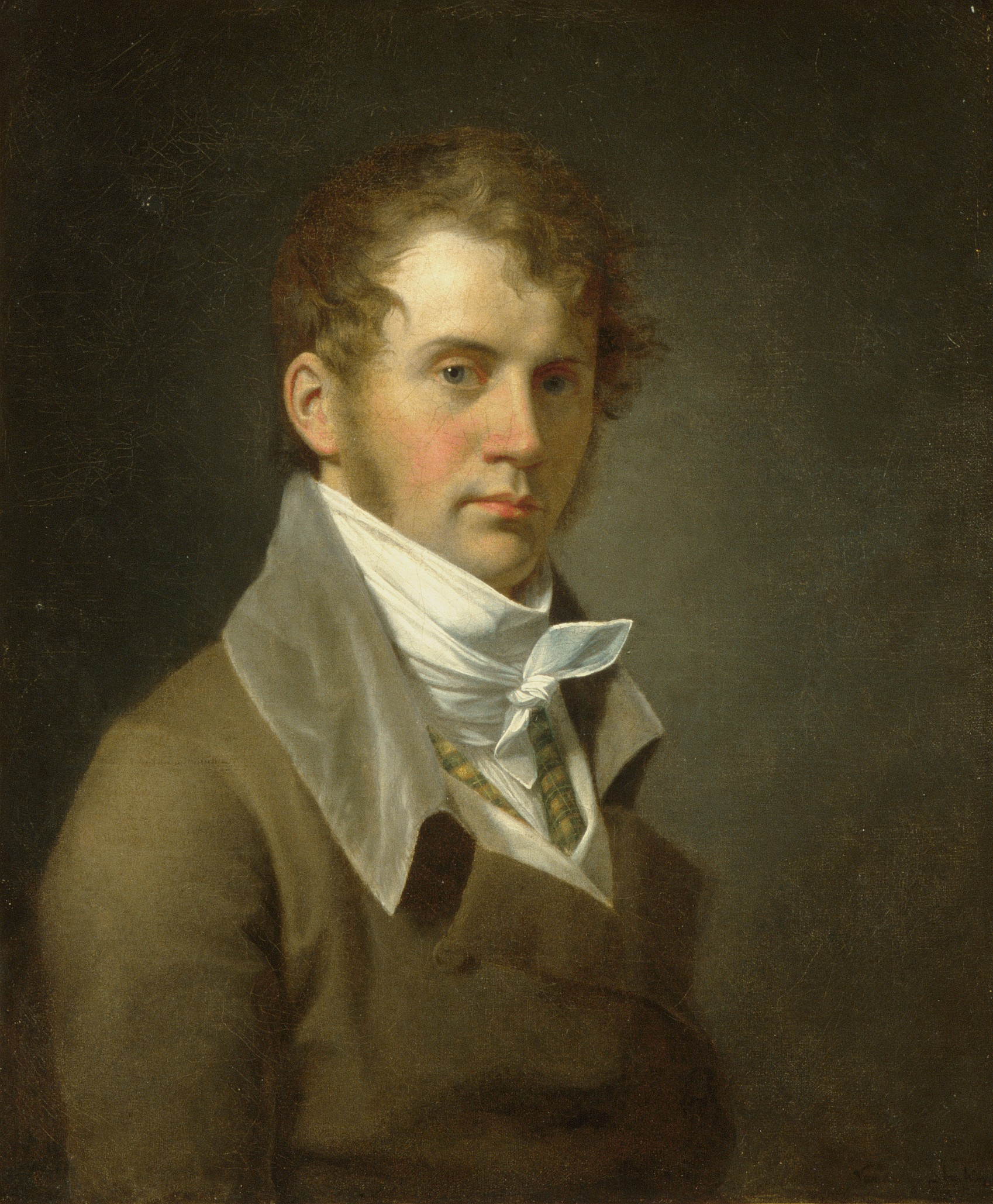
Self-Portrait by John Vanderlyn

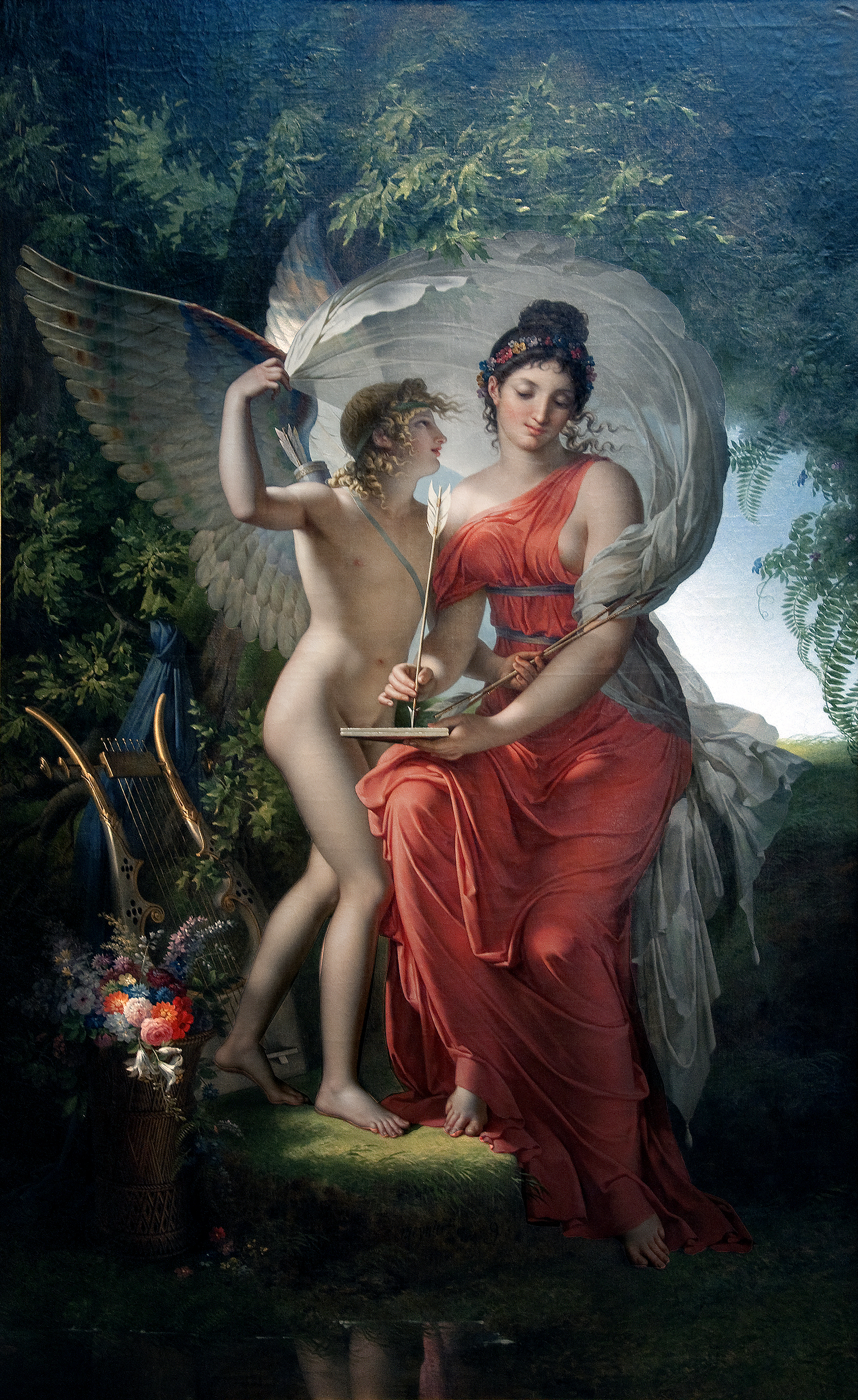
Erato, Muse of Lyrical Poetry by Charles Meynier

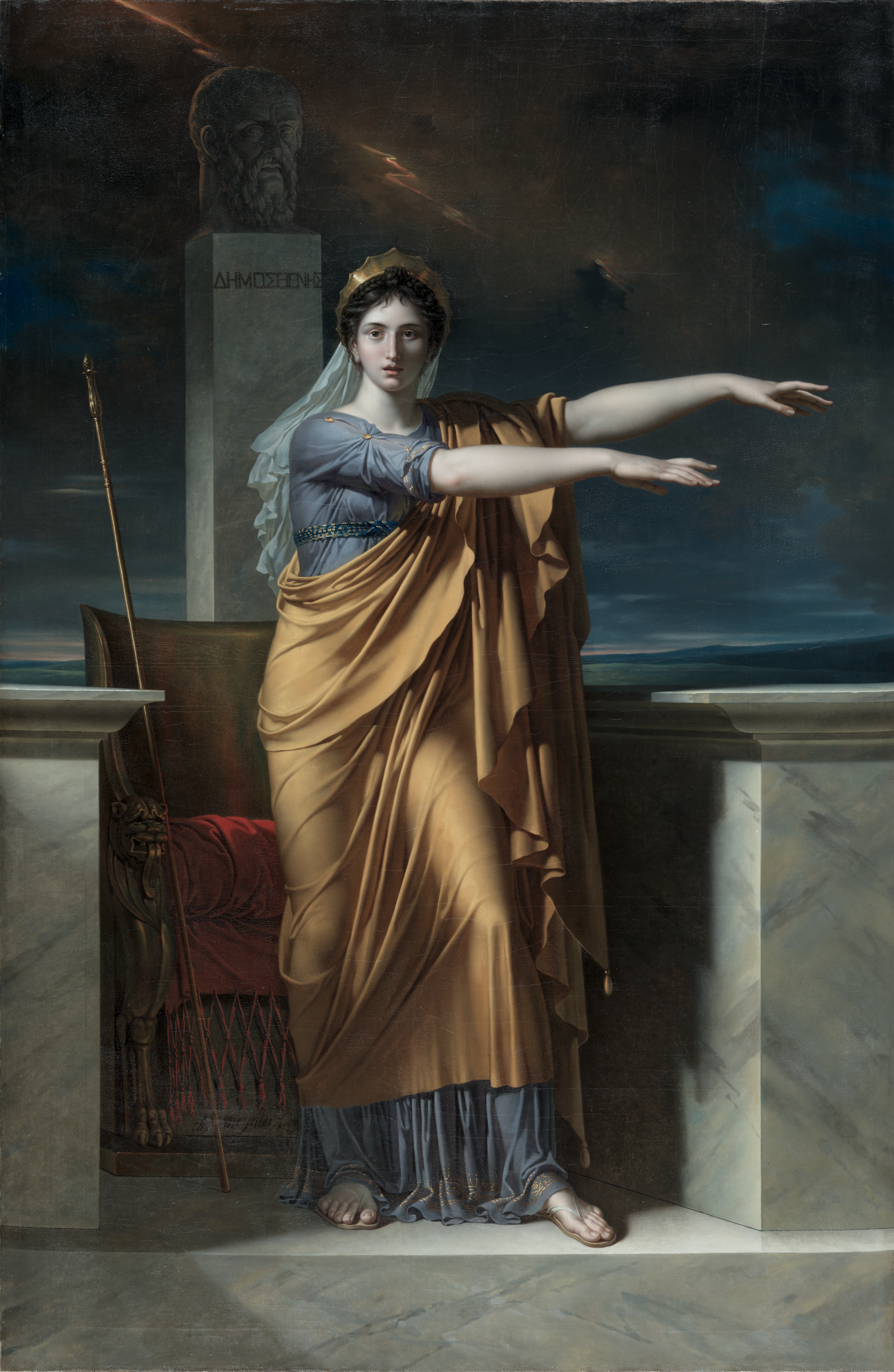
Polyhymnia, Muse of Eloquence by Charles Meynier

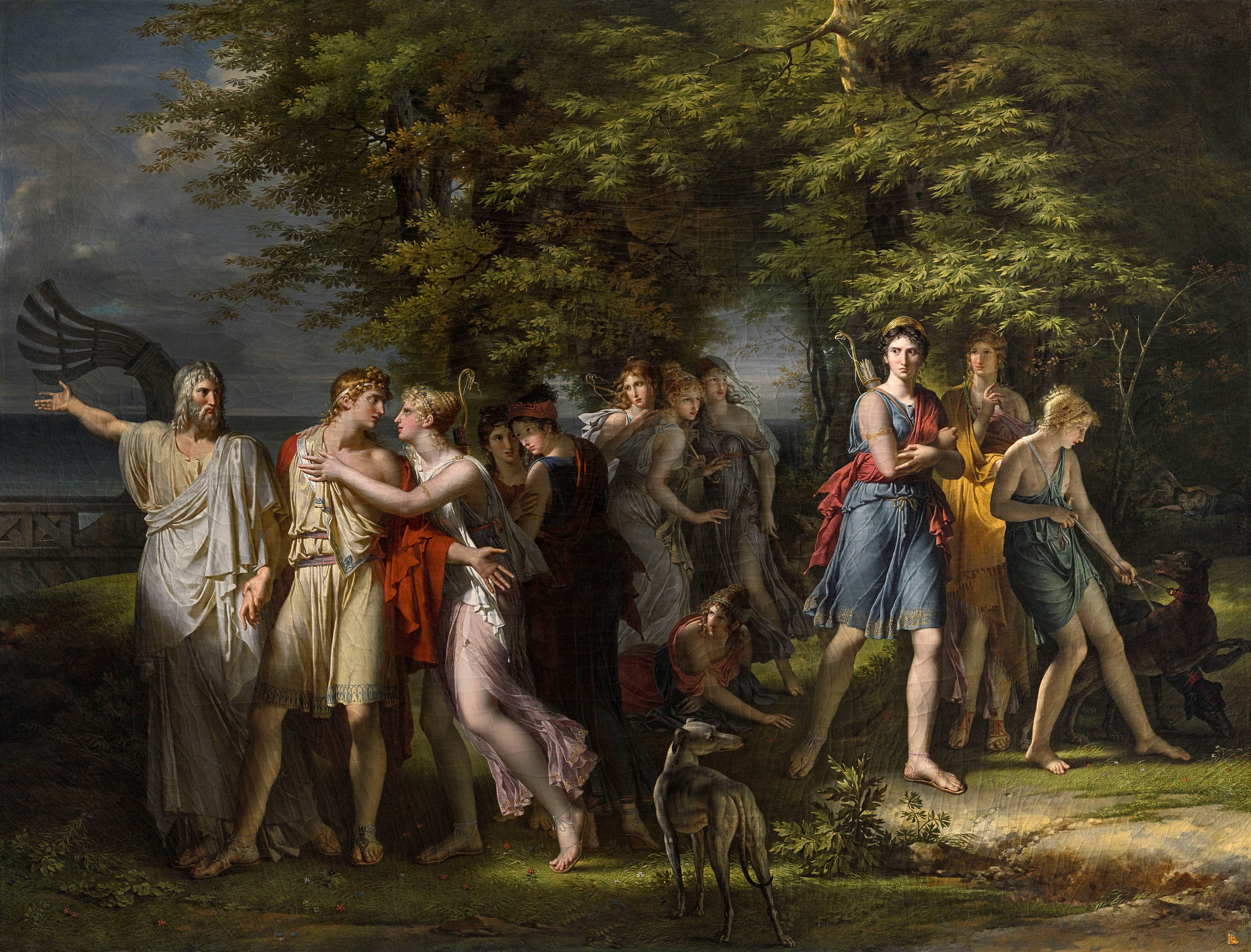
Telemachus, Urged by Mentor, Leaving the Island of Calypso by Charles Meynier

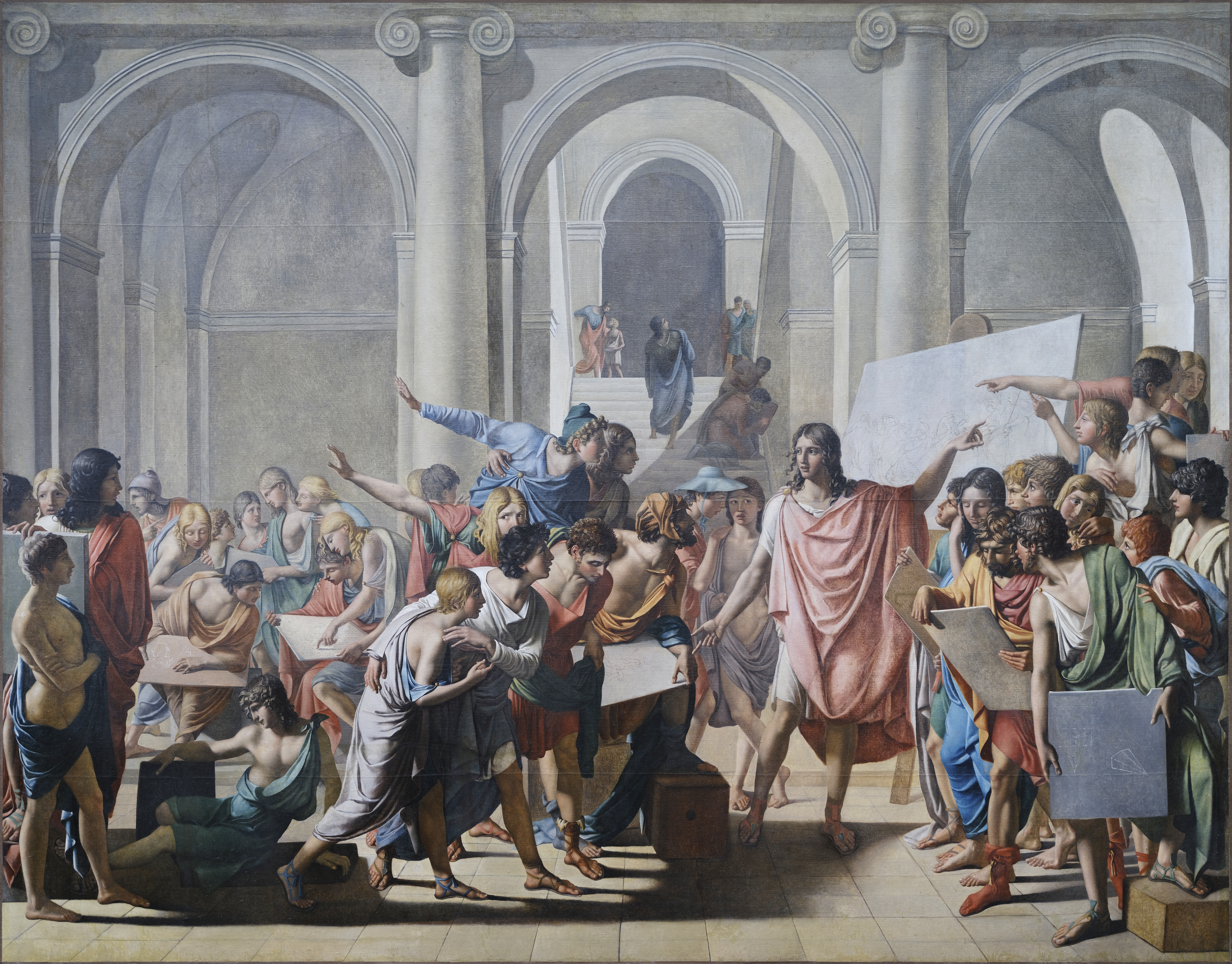
L'école d'Apelle by Jean Broc

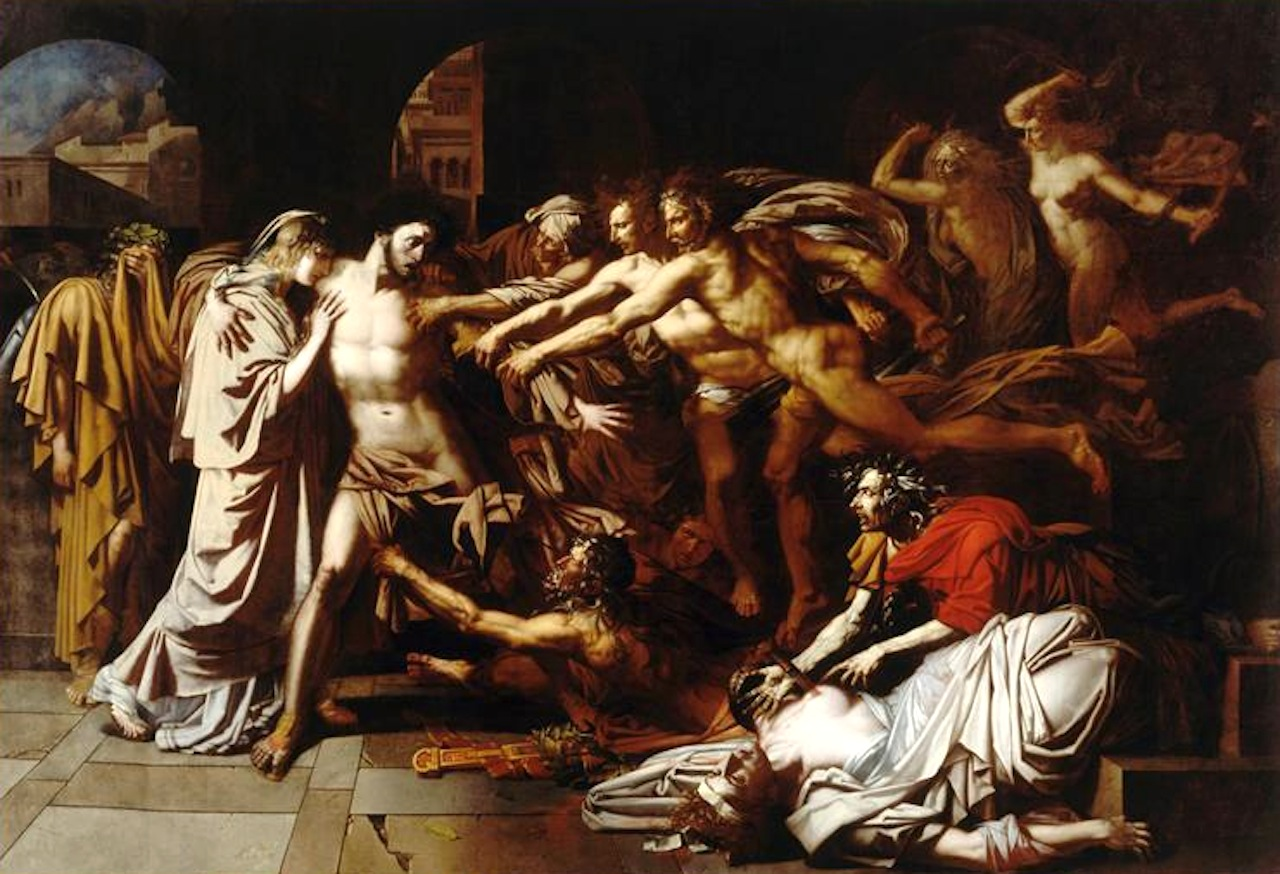
The Remorse of Orestes by Philippe-Auguste Hennequin

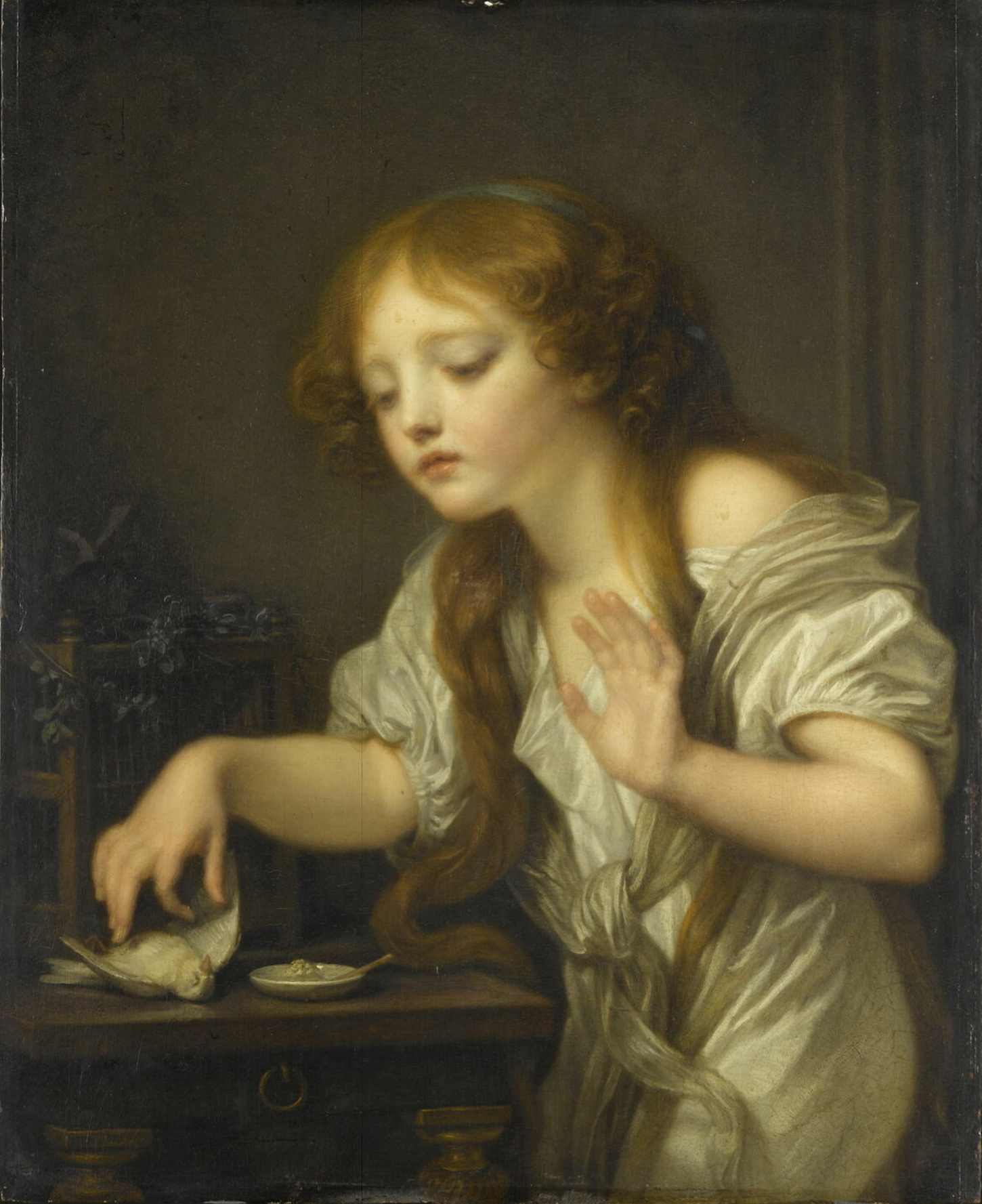
The Dead Bird by Jean-Baptiste Greuze

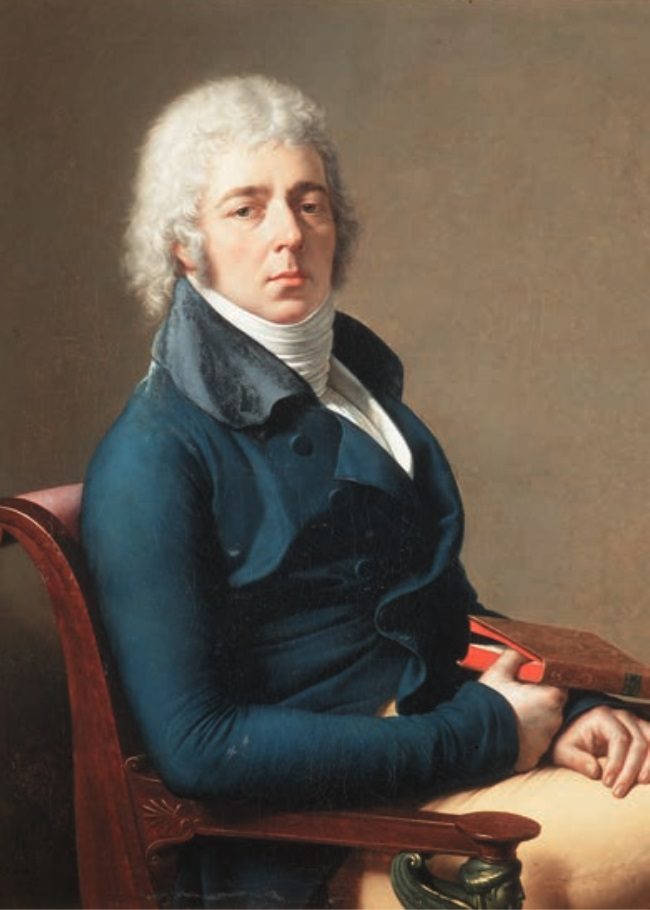
Portrait of Citizen Bourgeon by Girodet

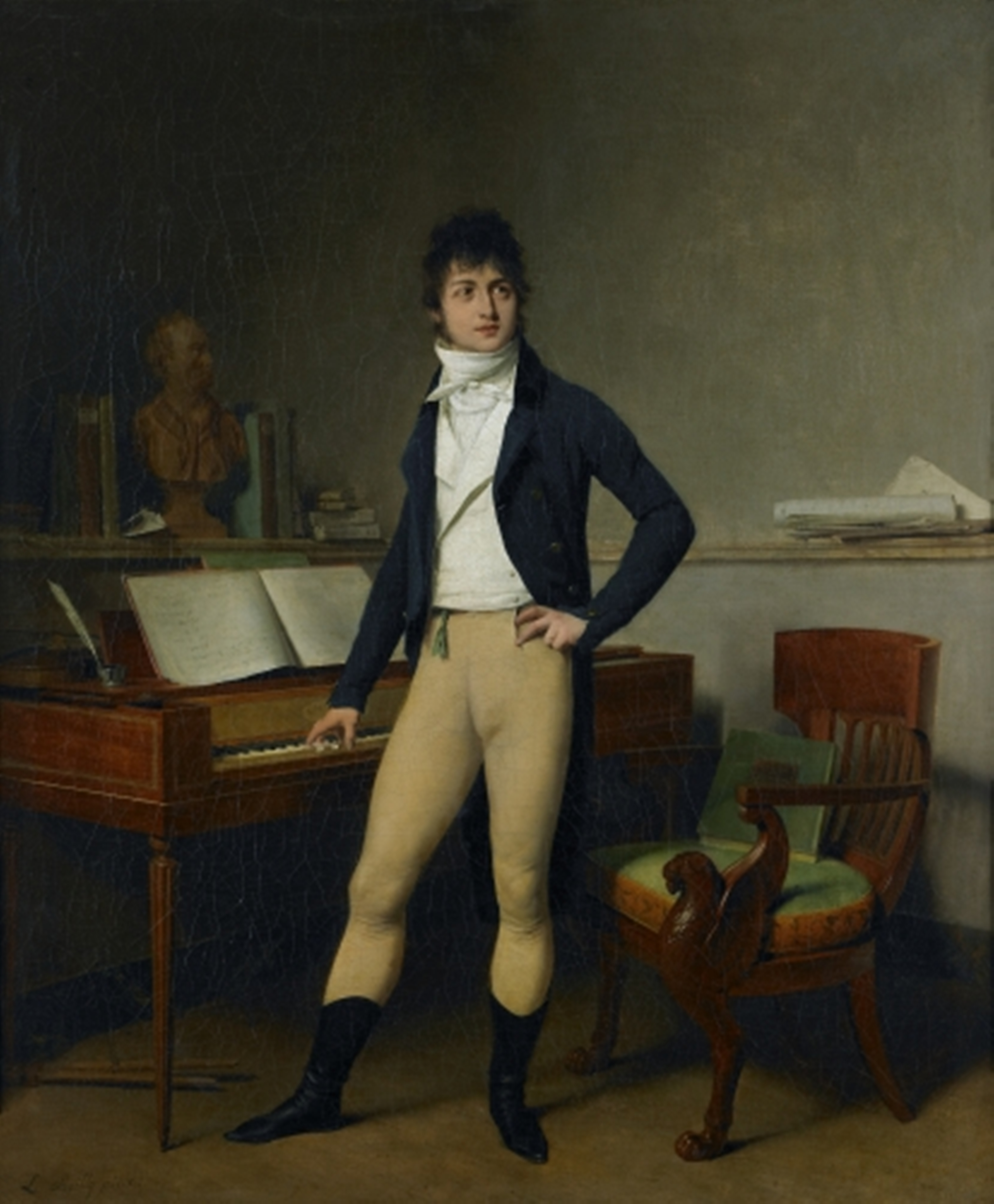
Portrait of François-Adrien Boieldieu by Louis-Léopold Boilly

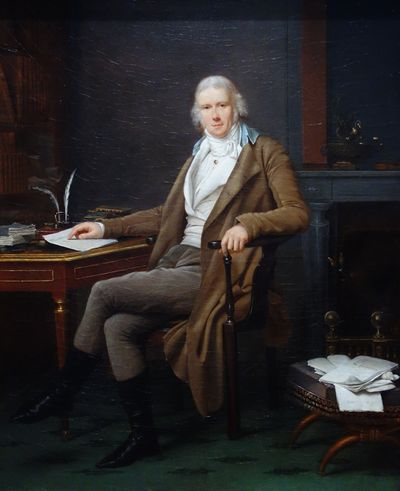
Portrait of Étienne Vigée by Adele Romany

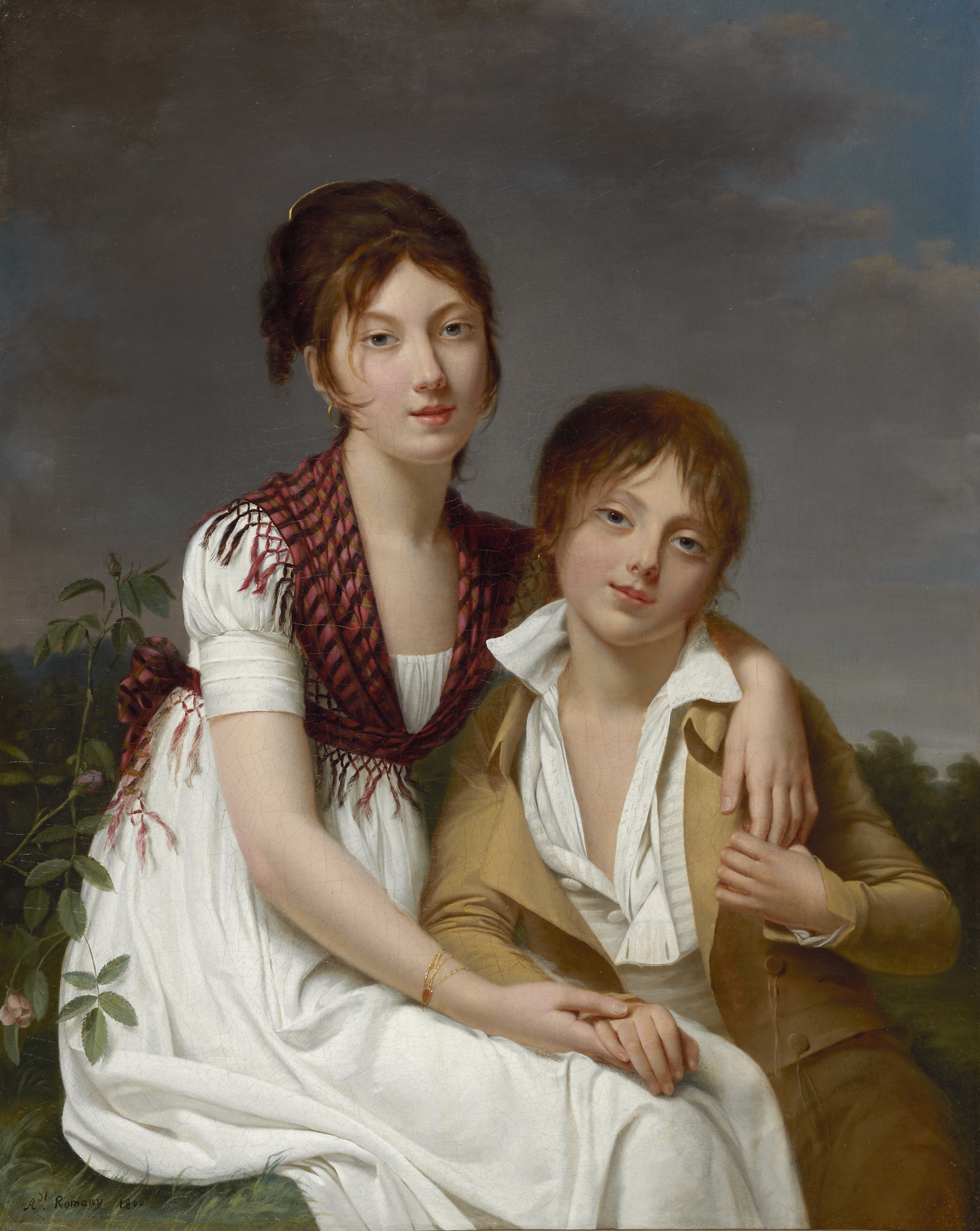
Amelie-Justine and Charles-Edouard Pontois by Adele Romany

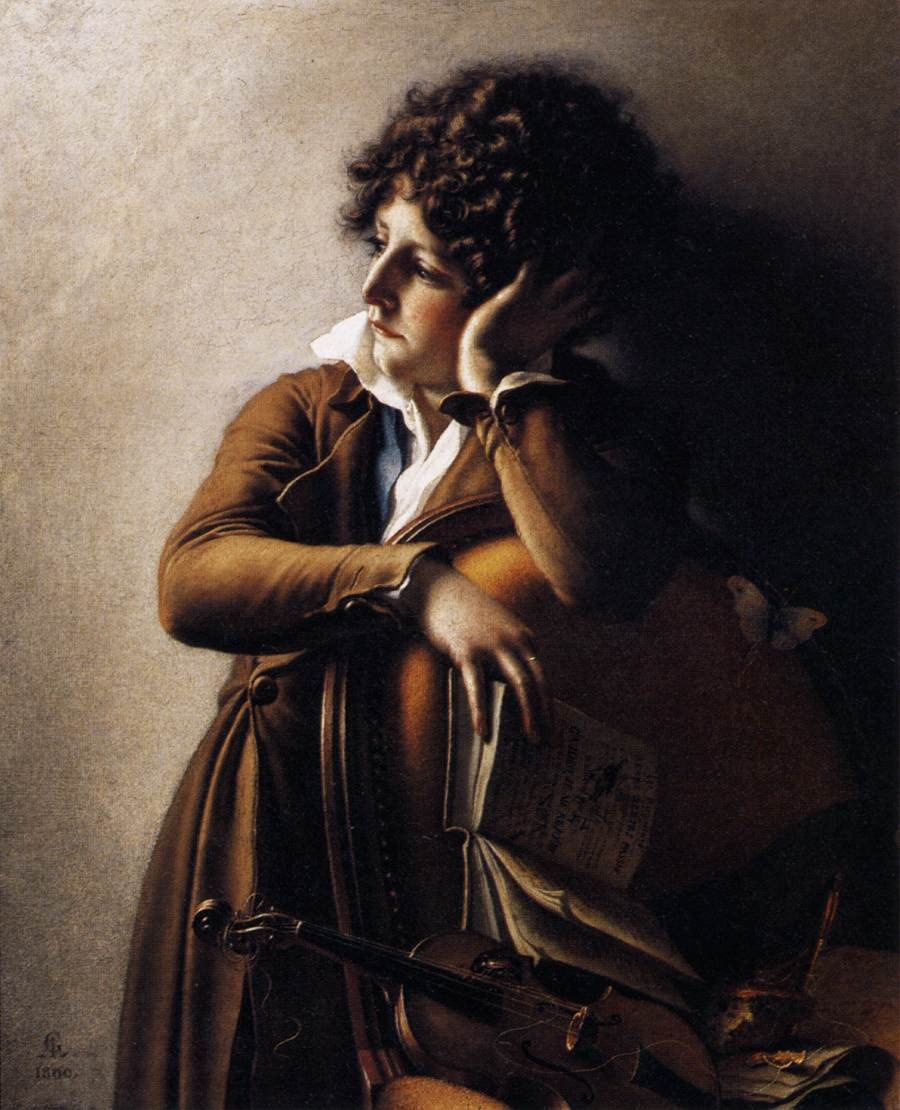
Portrait of Benoît-Agnes Trioson by Anne-Louis Girodet de Roussy-Trioson

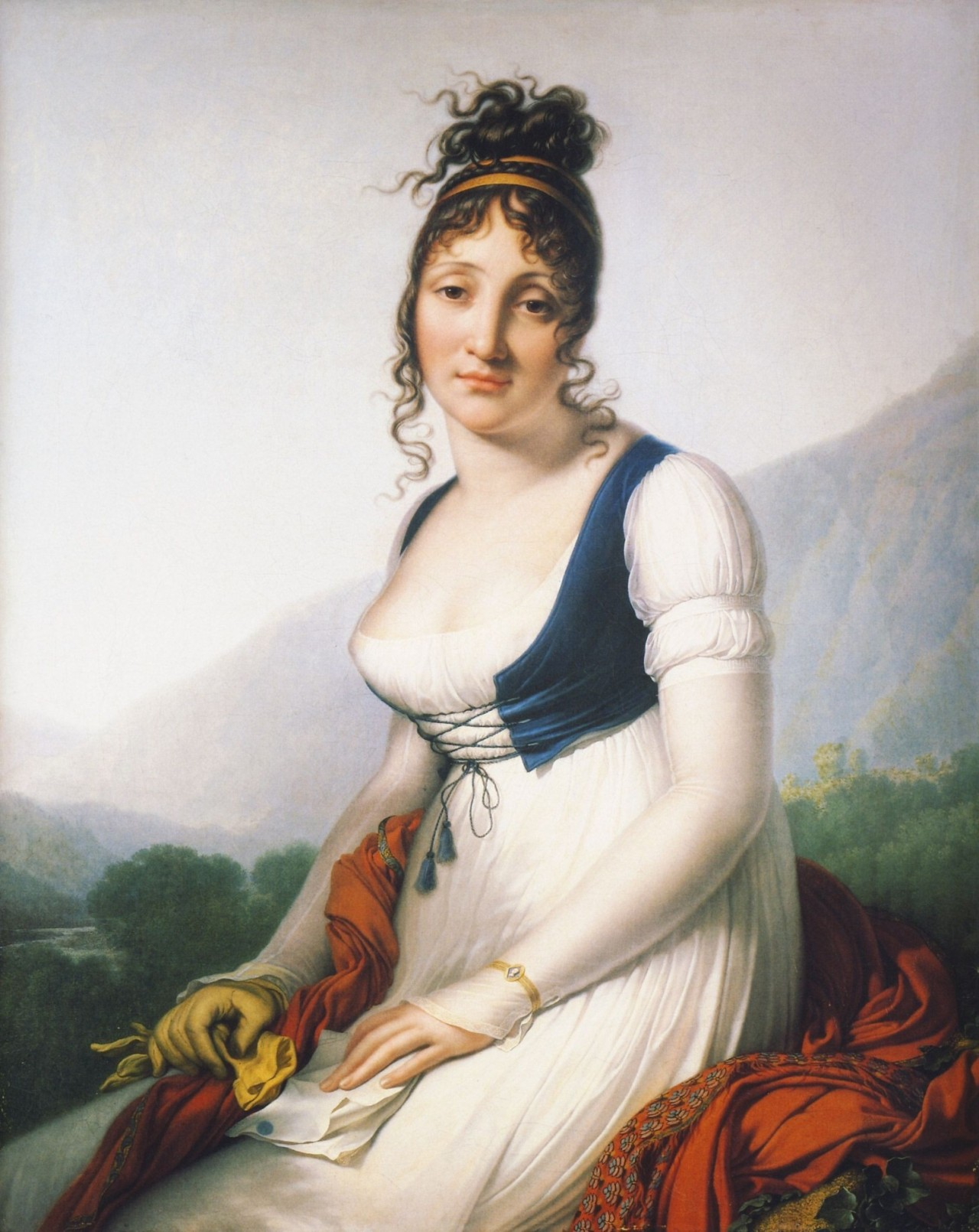
Portrait of Countess de Bonneval by Anne-Louis Girodet de Roussy-Trioson

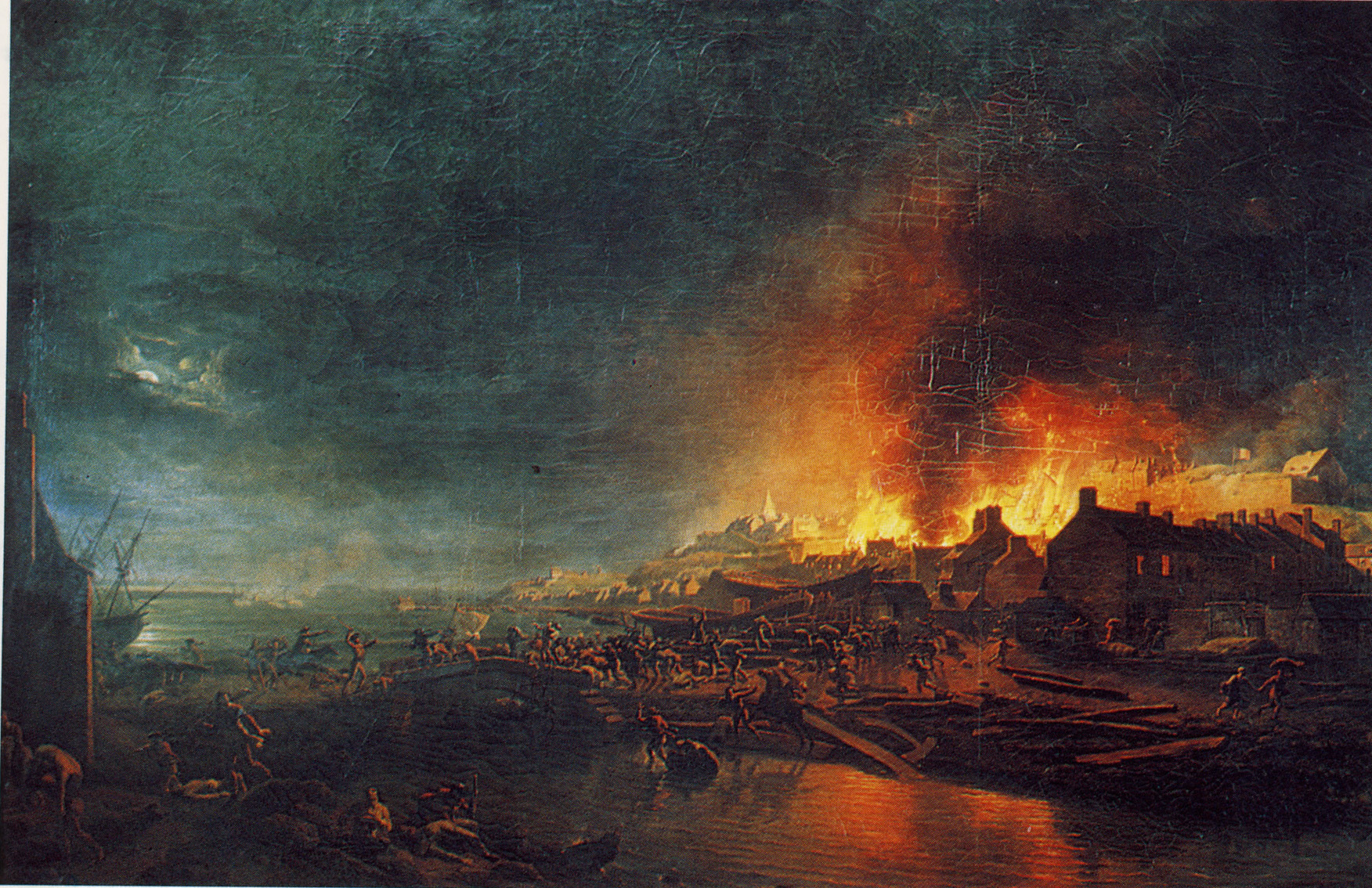
The Chouans Setting Fire to Granville by Jean-François Hue

== See also ==
- Category:Artworks exhibited at the Salon of 1800

== Bibliography ==
- Alsdorf, Bridget. Gawkers. Princeton University Press, 2022.
- Boime, Albert. A Social History of Modern Art, Volume 2: Art in an Age of Bonapartism, 1800-1815. University of Chicago Press, 1993.
- Gott, Ted & Huguenaud, Karine. Napoleon: Revolution to Empire. National Gallery of Victoria, 2012.
- Halliday, Anthony. Facing the Public: Portraiture in the Aftermath of the French Revolution. Manchester University Press, 2000.
- Ives, Colta Feller & Barker, Elizabeth E. Romanticism & the School of Nature. Metropolitan Museum of Art, 2000.
- Johnson, Dorothy. Jacques-Louis David: The Farewell of Telemachus and Eucharis. Getty Publications, 1997.
- Merrill, Jane & Endicott, John. Aaron Burr in Exile: A Pariah in Paris, 1810-1811. McFarland, 2016.
- Moon, Iris. The Architecture of Percier and Fontaine and the Struggle for Sovereignty in Revolutionary France. Taylor & Francis, 2016.
- Mullins, Charlotte. A Little History of Art. Yale University Press, 2022.
