= Caius Marius Amid the Ruins of Carthage =

Painting by John Vanderlyn

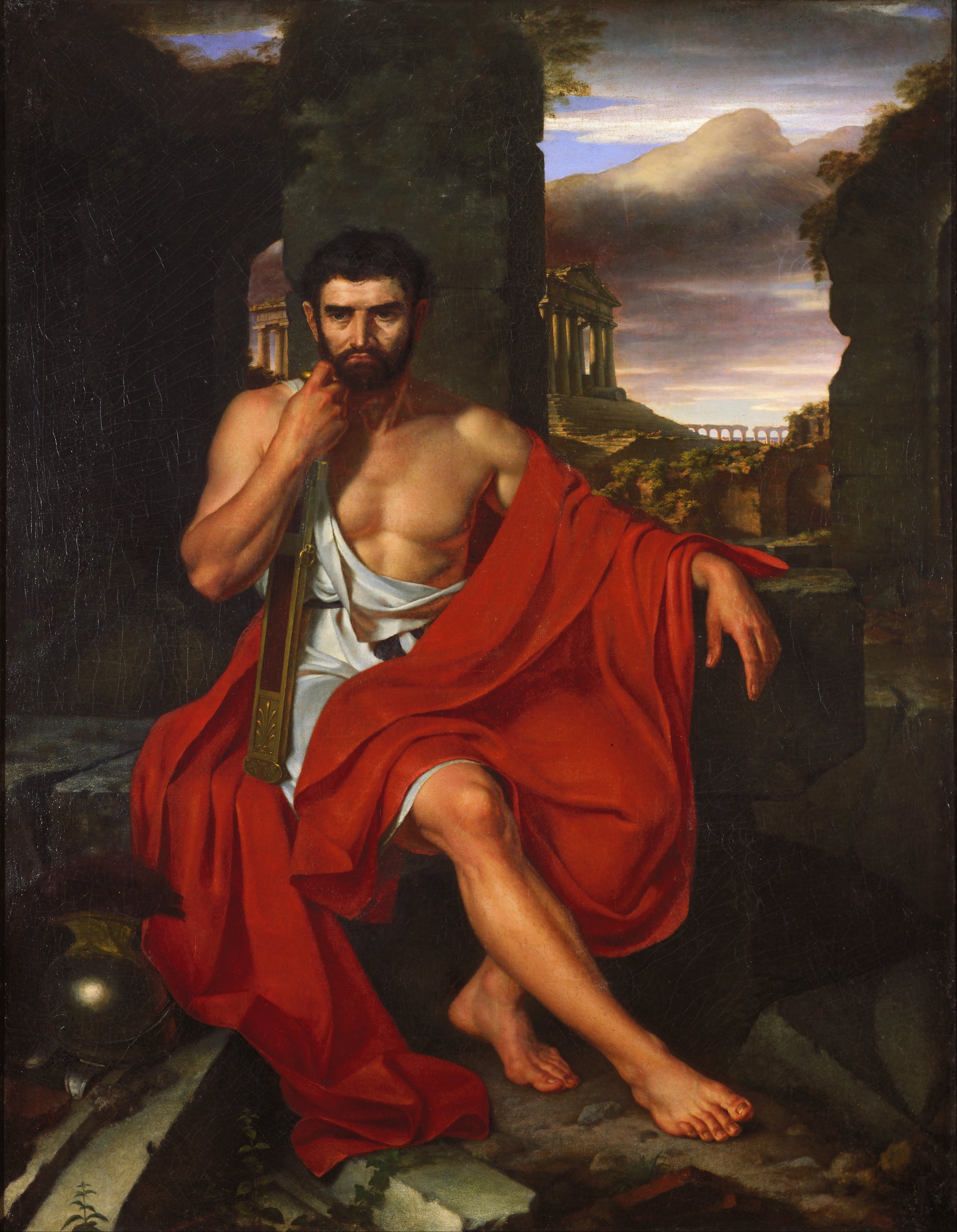
- Artist: John Vanderlyn
- Year: 1807
- Type: Oil on canvas, history painting
- Dimensions: 220 cm × 174 cm (87 in × 68.5 in)
- Location: Fine Arts Museums of San Francisco; San Francisco

Caius Marius Amid the Ruins of Carthage is an 1807 history painting by the American artist John Vanderlyn. It features a scene from Roman history, with the general Gaius Marius shown against the backdrop of Carthage in North Africa which remained in ruins from the earlier Siege of Carthage during the Third Punic War. Marius and his followers were in dispute with Sulla but on their arrival in Africa they were refused admission by the governor Publius Sextilius. Marius would later return to Rome to launch an armed takeover. Vanderlyn shows a brooding Marius seething with revenge.

The artist based the painting on a passage from Plutarch's Parallel Lives. The choice of subject may have made reference to Vanderlyn's patron, Aaron Burr, who had been tried but acquitted for treason for his part in the Burr conspiracy and gone into exile in Europe. The picture was first exhibited in Rome where it enjoyed success. The painting appeared at the Salon of 1808 at the Louvre in Paris where Napoleon was impressed by it, awarding Vanderlyn a gold medal for the work. Today it is in the collection of the Fine Arts Museums of San Francisco in California.

== Bibliography ==
- Boime, Albert. A Social History of Modern Art, Volume 2: Art in an Age of Bonapartism, 1800-1815. University of Chicago Press, 1993.
- Davies, Rachel Bryant. Troy, Carthage and the Victorians: The Drama of Classical Ruins in the Nineteenth-Century Imagination. Cambridge University Press, 2018.
- Merrill, Jane & Endicott, John. Aaron Burr in Exile: A Pariah in Paris, 1810-1811. McFarland, 2016.
