= Landing of Columbus =

Painting by John Vanderlyn

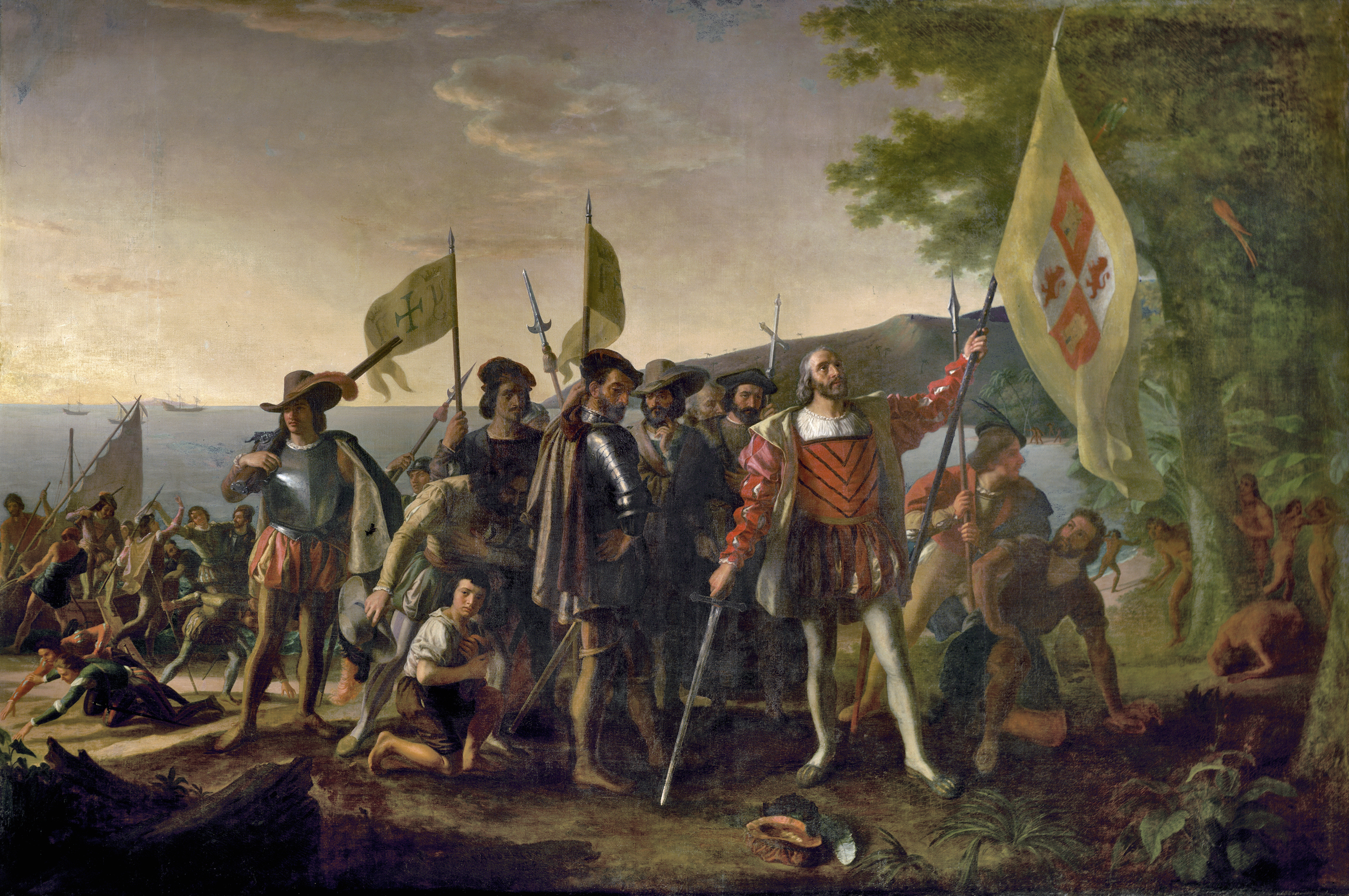
- Artist: John Vanderlyn
- Year: 1847
- Type: Oil on canvas, history painting
- Dimensions: 365.7 cm × 548.6 cm (144.0 in × 216.0 in)
- Location: Capitol Rotunda, Washington

Landing of Columbus is an 1847 history painting by the American artist John Vanderlyn. It portrays the moment on October 12, 1492 when Christopher Columbus landed during his First voyage on the island of San Salvador. Columbus is shown amidst the sailors under his command, tilting his face upwards in prayer while clutching the Royal Standard of the Crown of Castile in one hand.

The painting was commissioned for the Capitol Rotunda in Washington D.C. An earlier group of four paintings featuring scenes from the American Revolution were produced by John Trumbull. A second group was commissioned from the late 1830s to include earlier scenes from American history.

Vanderlyn had spent his early career in Paris and had enjoyed success with his The Death of Jane McCrea.

The painting is the subject of the United States 15 cent stamp design of the 1869 pictorial issue.
