= Thomas Anburey =

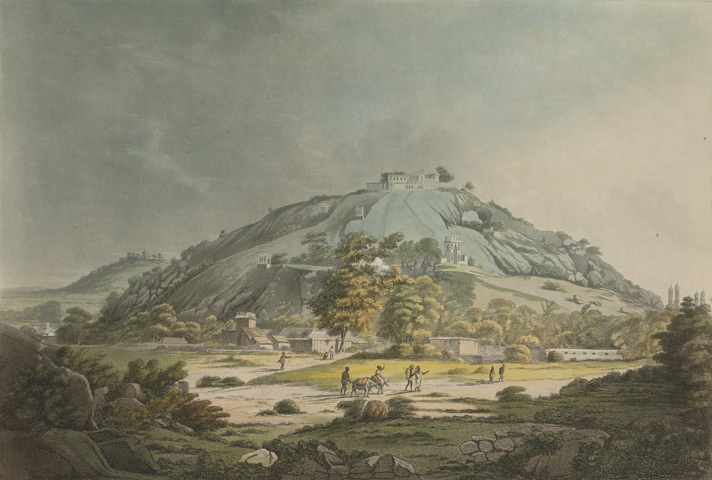
A view of Moula Ali Hill. This is plate 3 from 'Hindoostan Scenery consisting of Twelve Select Views in India'.

Thomas Anburey (active late 1700s) was a British explorer and writer who wrote a disputed narrative of his travels in North America in the 1770s-1780s.

Arnburey sailed from Cork in 1776 in charge of Irish recruits of the 47th Regiment. He served under General John Burgoyne in the Battle of Saratoga. Taken prisoner in the United States, he was sent back to Britain in 1781. He stayed in the army one more year, then returned to private life. He wrote “Travels Through the Interior Parts of America, 1771-1781” which was published in England in 1789. It was published again in London in 1791, described as a New Edition. It was reissued in 2 volumes in 1923.

This work has been “a subject of controversy and entertainment ever since” and there are claims of fraud.
