= The Death of Jane McCrea =

Painting by John Vanderlyn

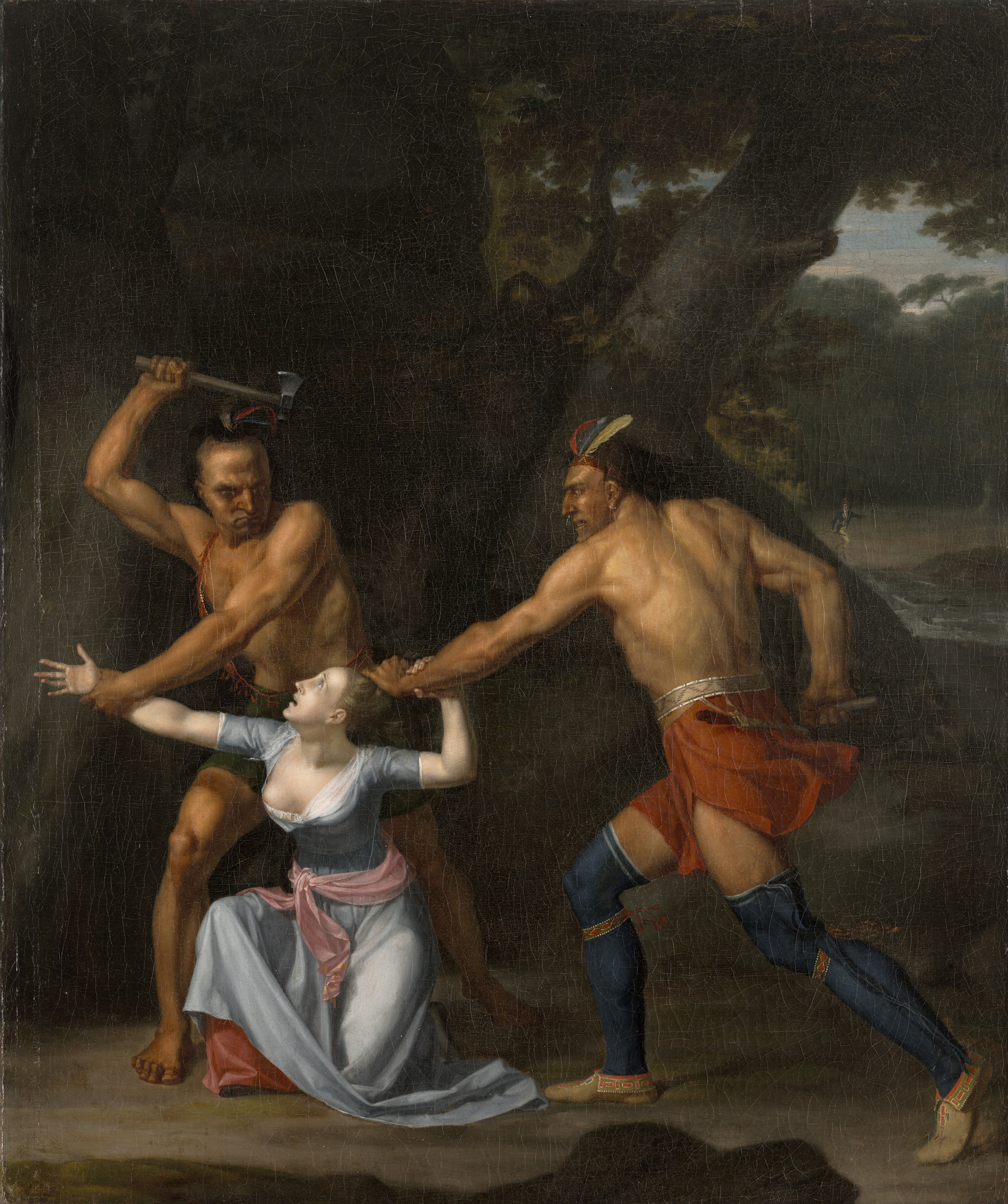
- Artist: John Vanderlyn
- Year: 1804
- Type: Oil on canvas, history painting
- Dimensions: 82.5 cm × 67.3 cm (32.5 in × 26.5 in)
- Location: Wadsworth Atheneum; Hartford, Connecticut

The Death of Jane McCrea is an 1804 history painting by the American painter John Vanderlyn. It depicts an incident from the American Revolutionary War when Jane McCrea was abducted and killed by two Native American warriors. The killing took place during the Saratoga campaign of 1777, with the warriors being part of a British-led expedition under John Burgoyne and killing McCrea despite the fact that she was engaged to Loyalist officer David Jones, who was also part of the expedition.

Vanderlyn was supportive of France during the French Revolutionary and Napoleonic Wars, and the painting has been argued to contain an anti-British theme via the depiction of a killing by British-allied Natives and depicting Jones, shown in the distance rushing to try and rescue McCrea, not in the red coat of the British Army but the blue coat of the Continental Army. Vanderlyn had moved to Paris and became the first American ever to exhibit at the Paris Salon when he displayed two portraits at the Salon of 1800 in the Louvre. He returned to Paris again and exhibited The Death of Jane McCrea, his first history painting, at the Salon of 1804. It was purchased the following year by Robert Fulton for the American Academy of the Fine Arts in New York City. Today the painting is in the Wadsworth Atheneum in Hartford, Connecticut.

== Bibliography ==
- Boime, Albert. A Social History of Modern Art, Volume 2: Art in an Age of Bonapartism, 1800-1815. University of Chicago Press, 1993.
- Kornhauser, Elizabeth Mankin & Ellis, Amy. Hudson River School: Masterworks from the Wadsworth Atheneum Museum of Art. Yale University Press, 2003.
