= Pieter Vanderlyn =

American painter

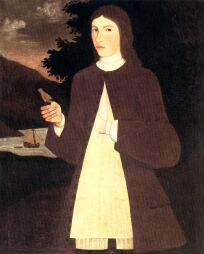
Portrait of Pau de Wandelaer attributed to Vanderlyn, 1730

Pieter Vanderlyn (c. 1687 – 1778) was an American colonial painter.

== Biography ==
Pieter Vanderlyn was born in Holland, in about 1687, studied in Amsterdam, and served with the Dutch navy off the coast of Africa probably as a surgeon. From here he went to Curaçao before moving on to arrive in New York in 1718. In this year he married Gerretje Van de Berg, who bore him a daughter the following year, but both died shortly afterwards. Four years later, he married Geertruy Vas, daughter of Petrus Vas, a Dutch clergyman with a congregation in Kingston, New York. He made his living as a portrait painter, land speculator and in other trades, travelling frequently between Kingston and Albany and residing at various times in each city.

His paintings were completed between 1730 and 1745 and were all unsigned, though some bore an inscription. Analysis of these inscriptions, together with other sources, enabled Mary Black in 1969 to identify Vanderlyn as the "Gansevoort Limner," an otherwise unidentified portrait painter of this era, though the attribution remains controversial. There are works by Vanderlyn in the collections of the National Gallery of Art, the Metropolitan Museum of Art, the Newark Museum of Art, the New-York Historical Society, the Terra Foundation for American Art and the Chrysler Museum of Art.

Vanderlyn was living in Kingston during the American Revolutionary War until British forces burned the city on October 13, 1777. This event forced him to flee to his church and family's impromptu home in Marbletown, where he died the following year. The painter John Vanderlyn and lawyer Henry Van Der Lyn were his grandsons.
