= John Vanderlyn =

American painter (1775–1852)

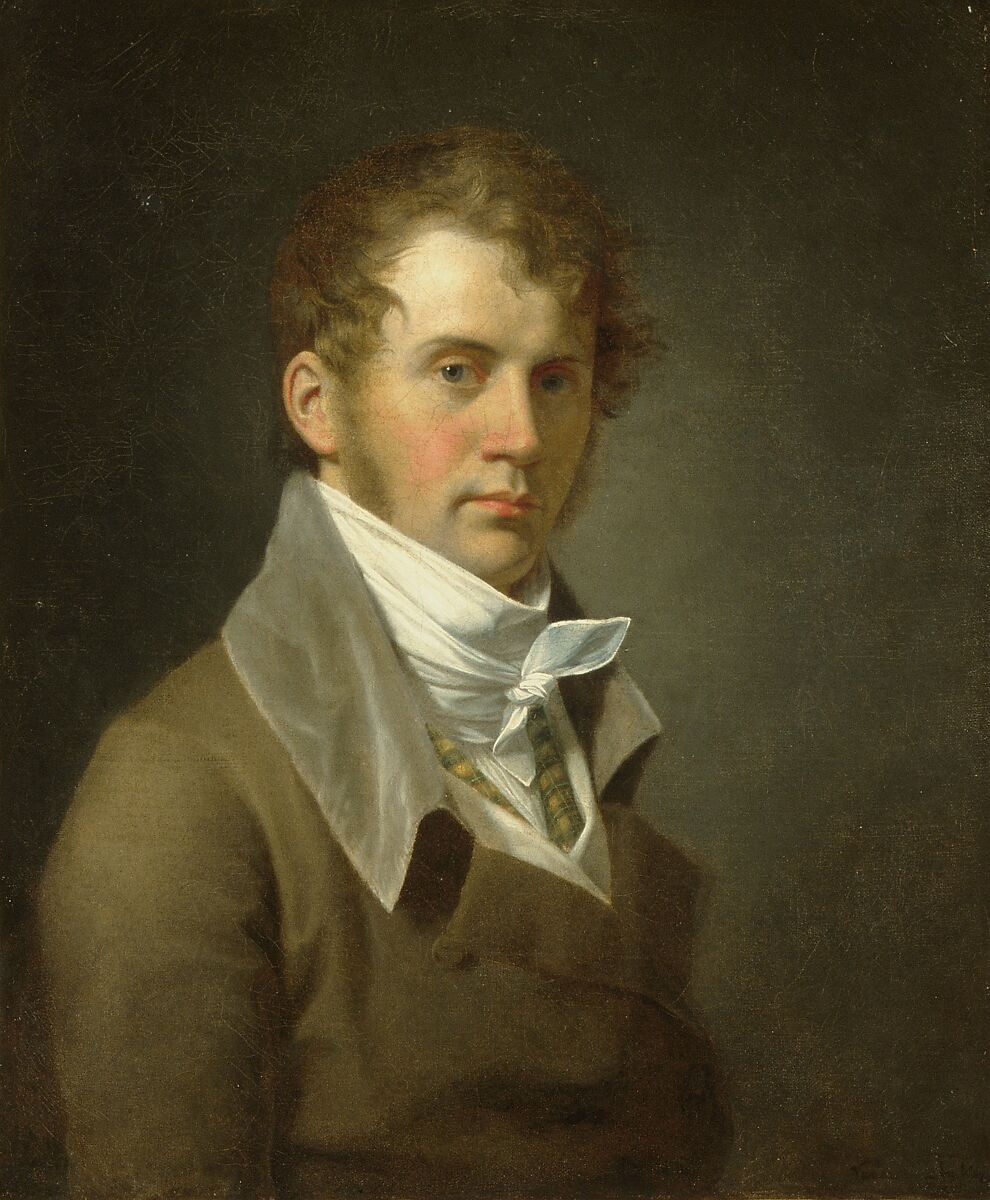
- Self-Portrait, c. 1800
- Born: October 18, 1775; Kingston, Province of New York, British America
- Died: September 23, 1852 (aged 76); Kingston, New York, U.S.
- Known for: Painting

John Vanderlyn (October 18, 1775 – September 23, 1852) was an American painter.

== Early life and education ==
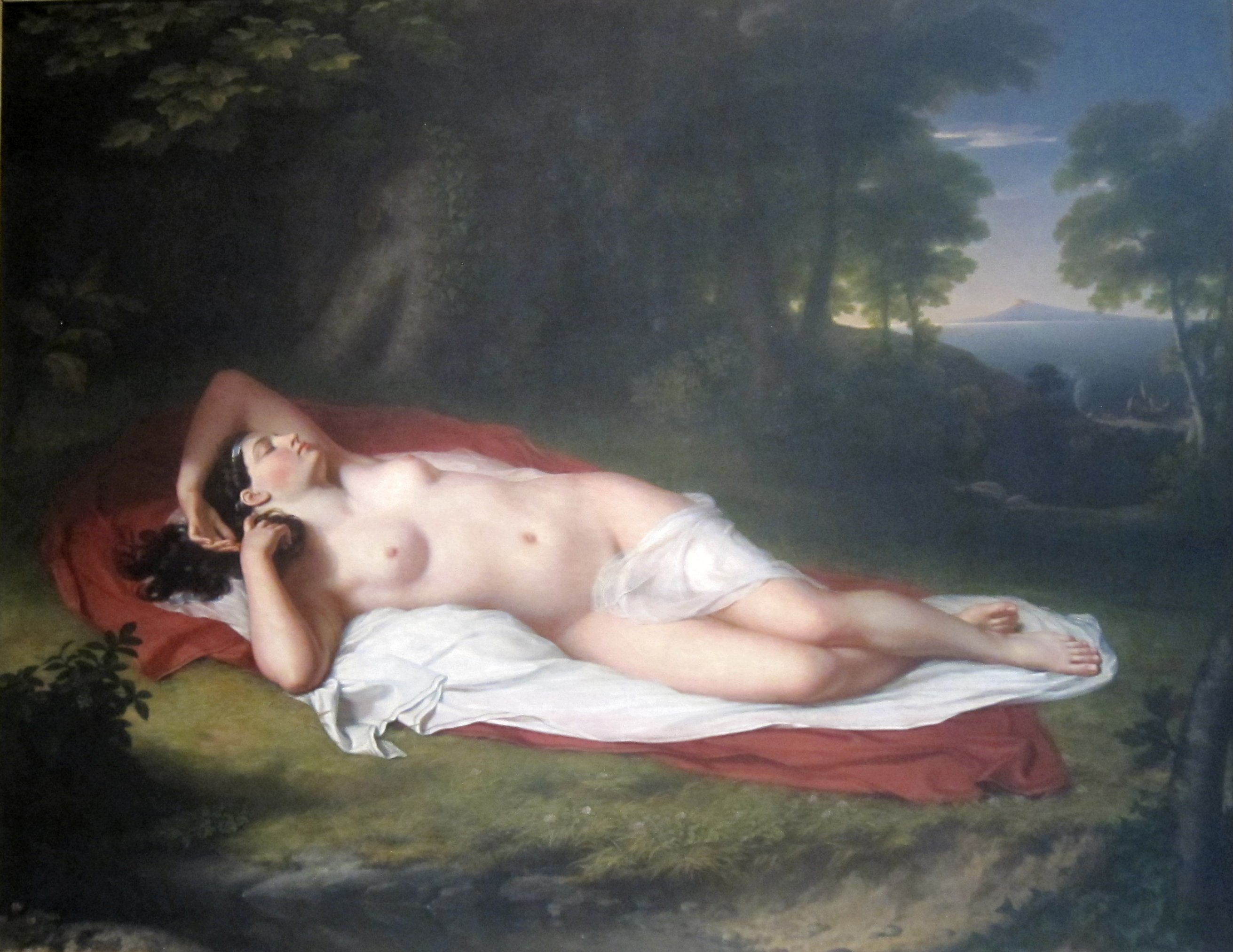
Ariadne Asleep on the Island of Naxos, now housed at the Pennsylvania Academy of the Fine Arts in Philadelphia

Vanderlyn was born at Kingston in the Province of New York in British America, the grandson of colonial portrait painter Pieter Vanderlyn.

He was employed by a print seller in New York, and was first instructed in art by Archibald Robinson (1765–1835), a Scotsman who was afterwards one of the directors of the American Academy of the Fine Arts. He went to Philadelphia, where he spent time in the studio of Gilbert Stuart and copied some of Stuart's portraits, including one of Aaron Burr, who placed him under Gilbert Stuart as a pupil.

He was a protégé of Aaron Burr, who in 1796 sent Vanderlyn to Paris, where he studied for five years.

== Career ==
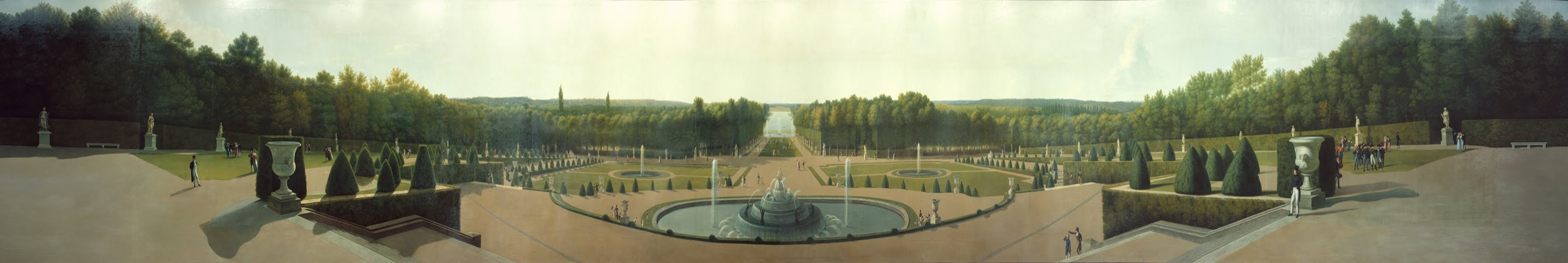
Panoramic View of the Palace and Gardens of Versailles (1818–19), now housed at Metropolitan Museum of Art in New York City

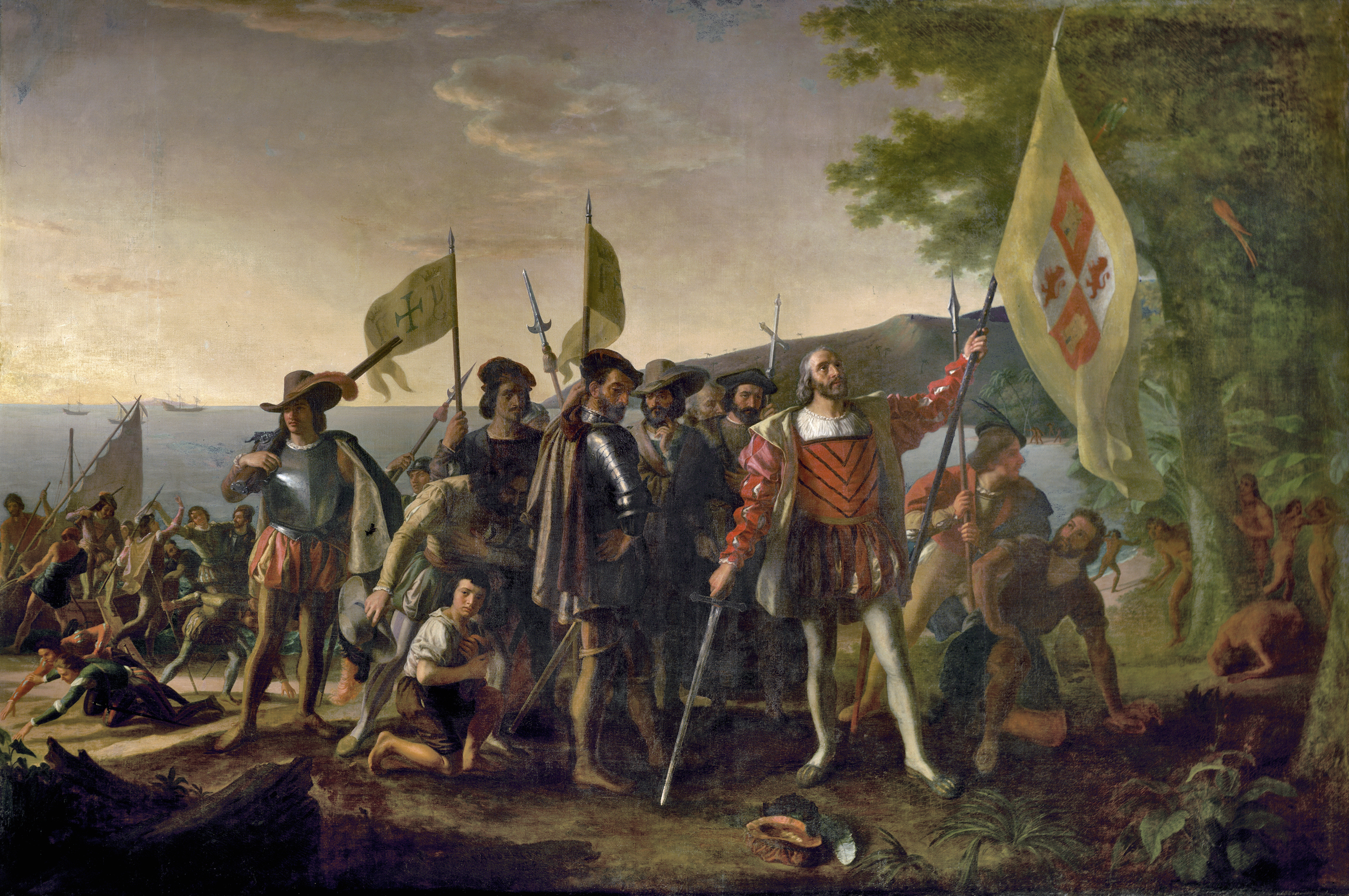
Landing of Columbus (1842–1847), depicting Christopher Columbus landing on San Salvador Island in the Bahamas, now on display at the U.S. Capitol Rotunda in Washington, D.C.

In 1801, Vanderlyn returned to the United States, where he lived in the home of Burr, then the vice president under Thomas Jefferson. He painted portraits of Burr and his daughter. In 1802, he painted two views of Niagara Falls, which were engraved and published in London in 1804. He returned to Paris in 1803, also visiting England in 1804, where he painted his Salon of 1804 exhibition piece The Death of Jane McCrea for Joel Barlow. Vanderlyn then went to Rome, where he painted his picture of Caius Marius Amid the Ruins of Carthage, which was shown at the Salon of 1808 in Paris, and obtained the Napoleon gold medal there. This success caused him to remain in Paris for seven years, during which time he prospered greatly. In 1812 he showed a nude Ariadne (engraved by Durand, and now in the Pennsylvania Academy), which increased his fame. When Aaron Burr fled to Paris, Vanderlyn was for a time his only support.

Vanderlyn returned to the United States in 1815, and painted portraits of various eminent men, including James Monroe, John C. Calhoun, Governor Joseph C. Yates, Governor George Clinton, James Madison, Robert R Livingston (New York Historical Society), Andrew Jackson, and Zachary Taylor. In 1834, he completed a posthumous full-length portrait of George Washington for the U.S. House of Representatives, based on Gilbert Stuart's 1796 Lansdowne Portrait.

He also exhibited panoramas and built The Rotunda in New York City, which displayed panoramas of Paris, Athens, Mexico, Versailles (by himself), and some battle-pieces; but neither his portraits nor the panoramas brought him financial success, partly because he worked very slowly.

In 1825, Vanderlyn was one of the founders of the National Academy of Design, and taught at its school.

In 1842, through friendly influences, he was commissioned by Congress to paint the Landing of Columbus for the Rotunda of the United States Capitol. Going to Paris, he hired a French artist, who, it is said, did most of the work. It was engraved for the United States five-dollar banknotes. This painting was later reproduced in an engraving used on the Columbian 2c Postage Issue of 1893.

Vanderlyn was the first American to study in France instead of in England. He was more academic than his fellows; but, though faithfully and capably executed, it was thought that his work was rather devoid of charm, according to the 1911 Encyclopædia Britannica. His Landing of Columbus has been called by Appleton's Cyclopedia "hardly more than respectable". He died in poverty at Kingston, New York, on September 23, 1852. He is buried in Wiltwyck Rural Cemetery in Kingston, NY.

== Gallery ==
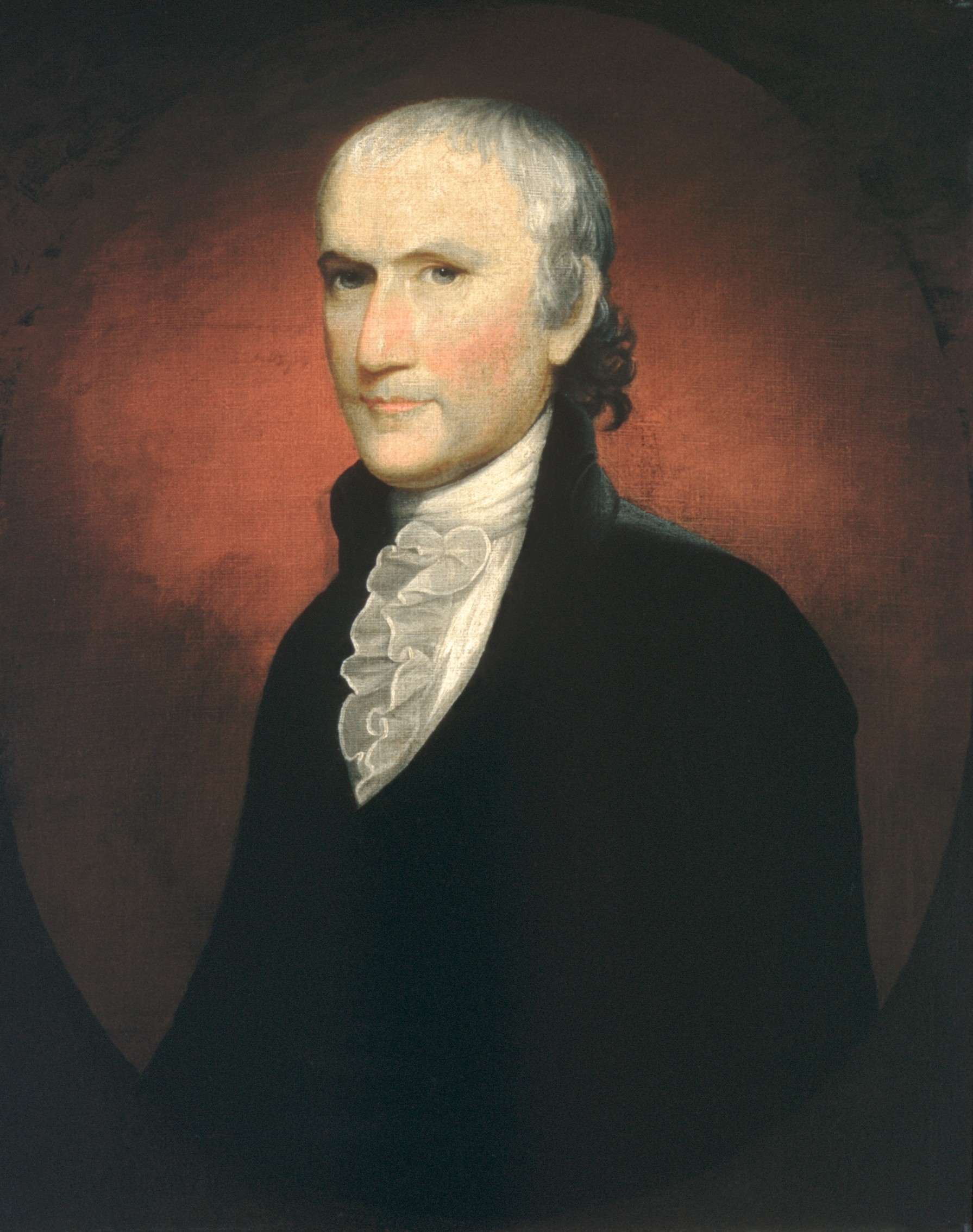
^{Metropolitan Museum of Art}
Portrait of Egbert Benson, after Gilbert Stuart, c. 1794

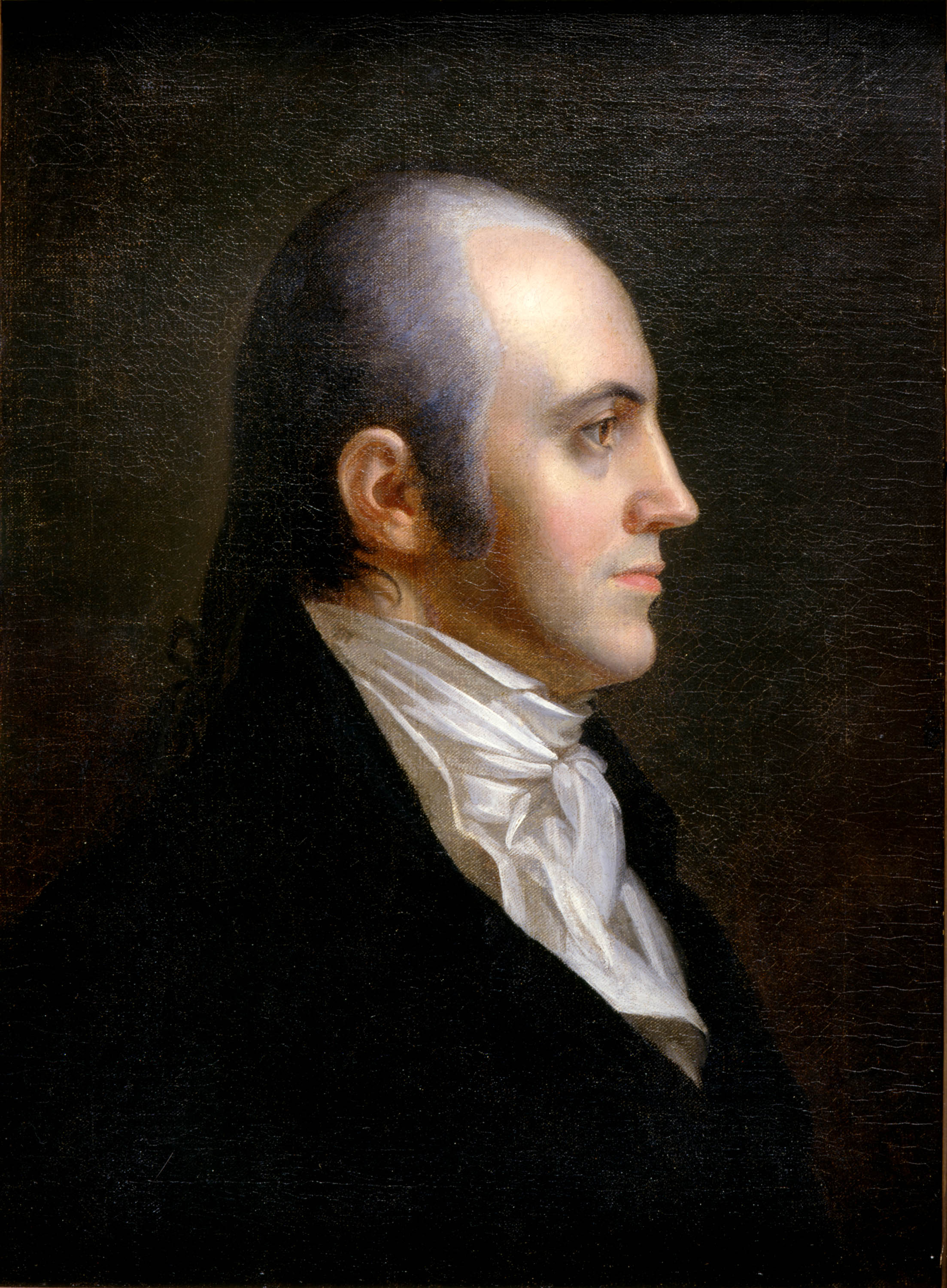
^{New York Historical Society}
Portrait of Aaron Burr, c. 1802

^{New York Historical Society}
Portrait of Theodosia Burr Alston, c. 1802

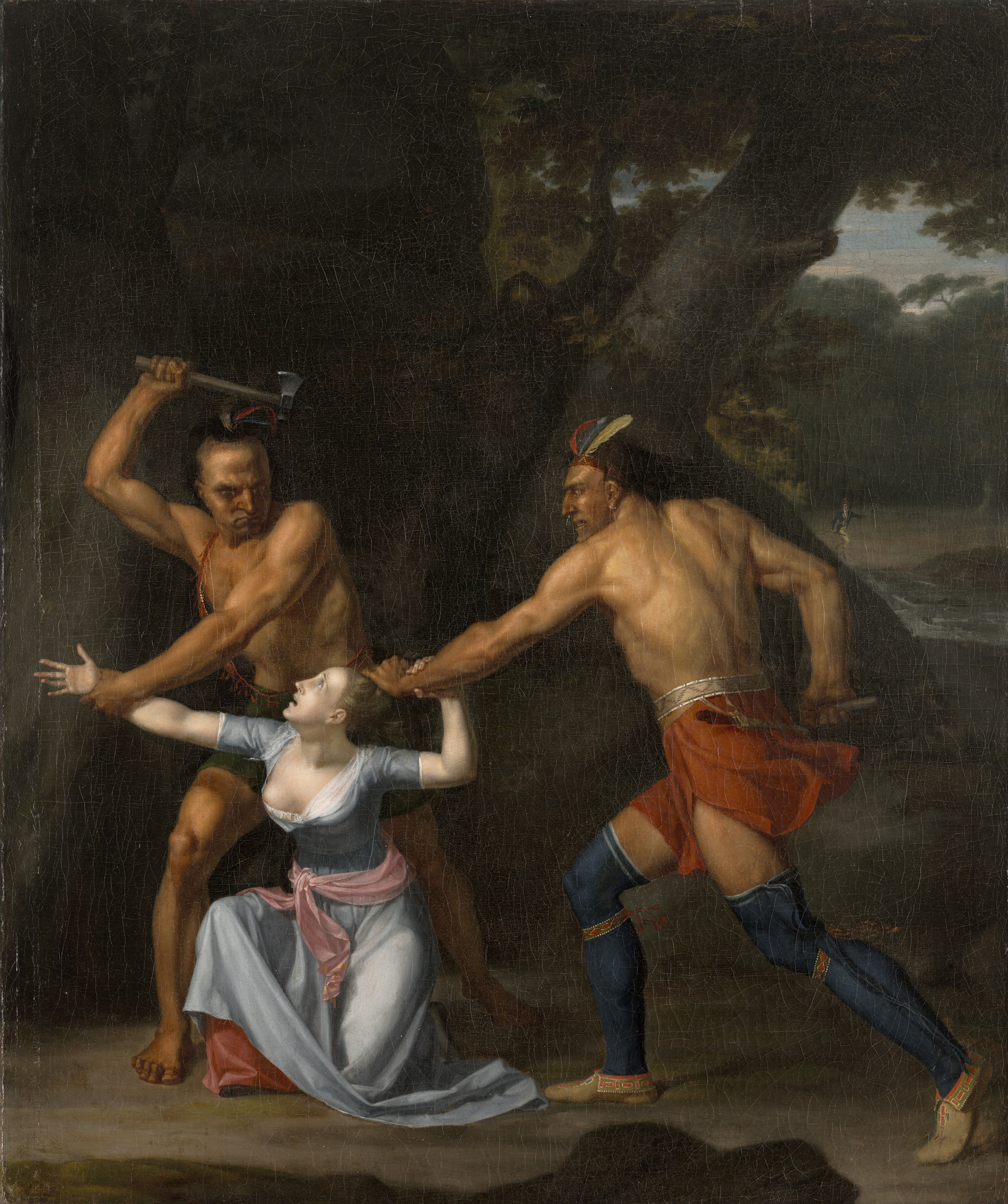
^{Wadsworth Athenaeum}
The Death of Jane McCrea, c. 1804

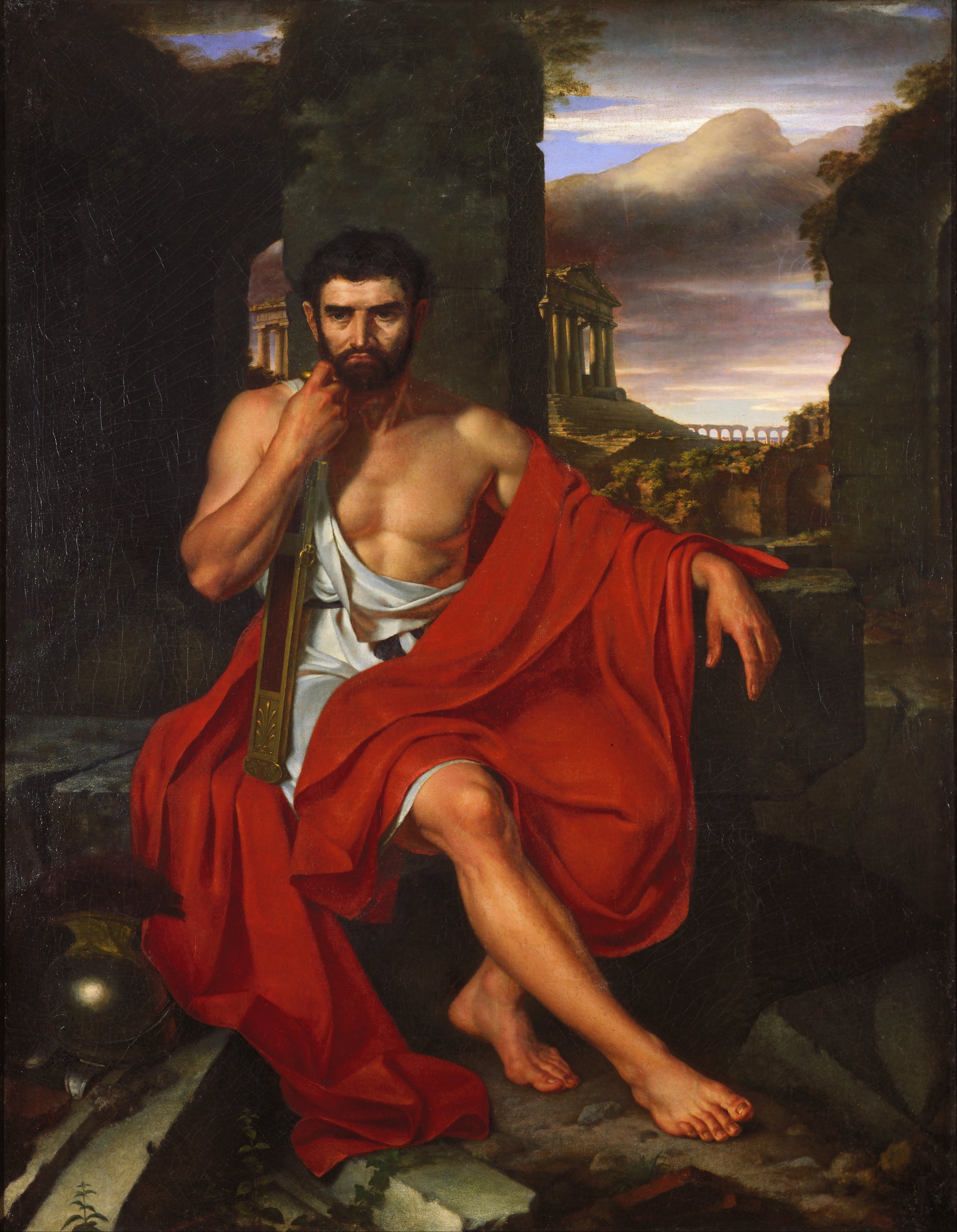
^{Fine Arts Museums of San Francisco}
Caius Marius Amid the Ruins of Carthage, c. 1807

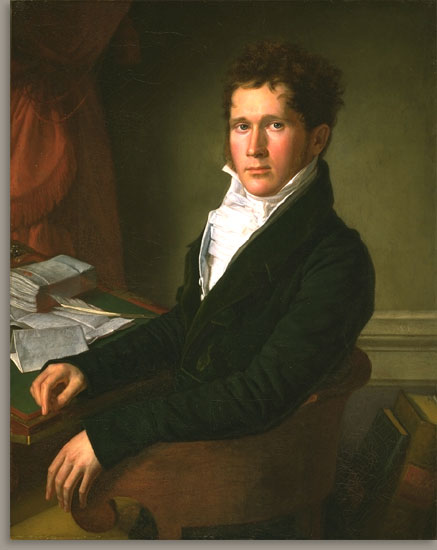
^{Worcester Art Museum}
Portrait of Sampson Vryling Stoddard Wilder, c. 1808–1812

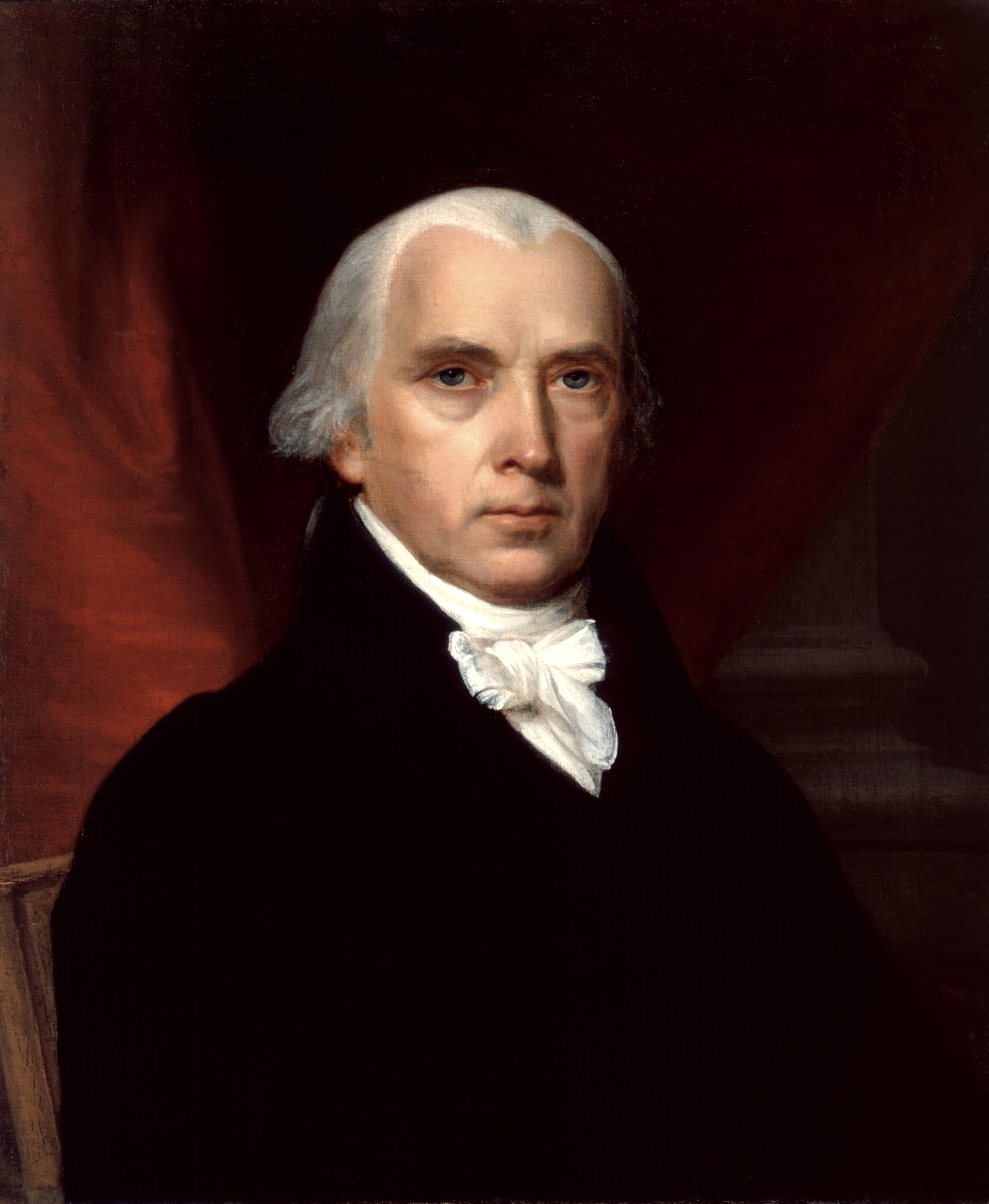
^{White House Collection}
Portrait of James Madison, c. 1816

^{Yale University Art Gallery}
Portrait of Elias Boudinot, c. 1821

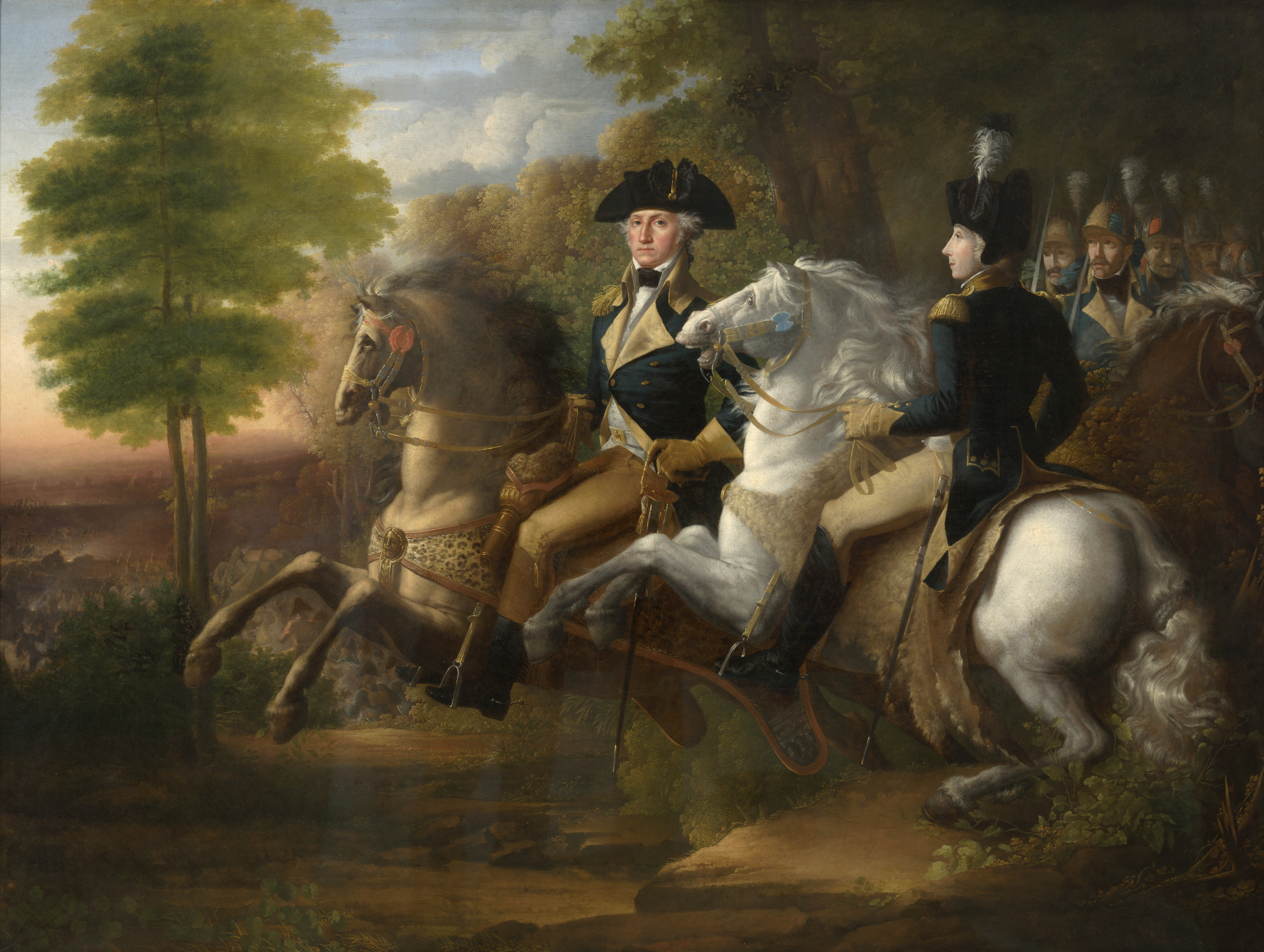
^{Gilcrease Museum}
Washington and Lafayette at the Battle of Brandywine, c. 1825

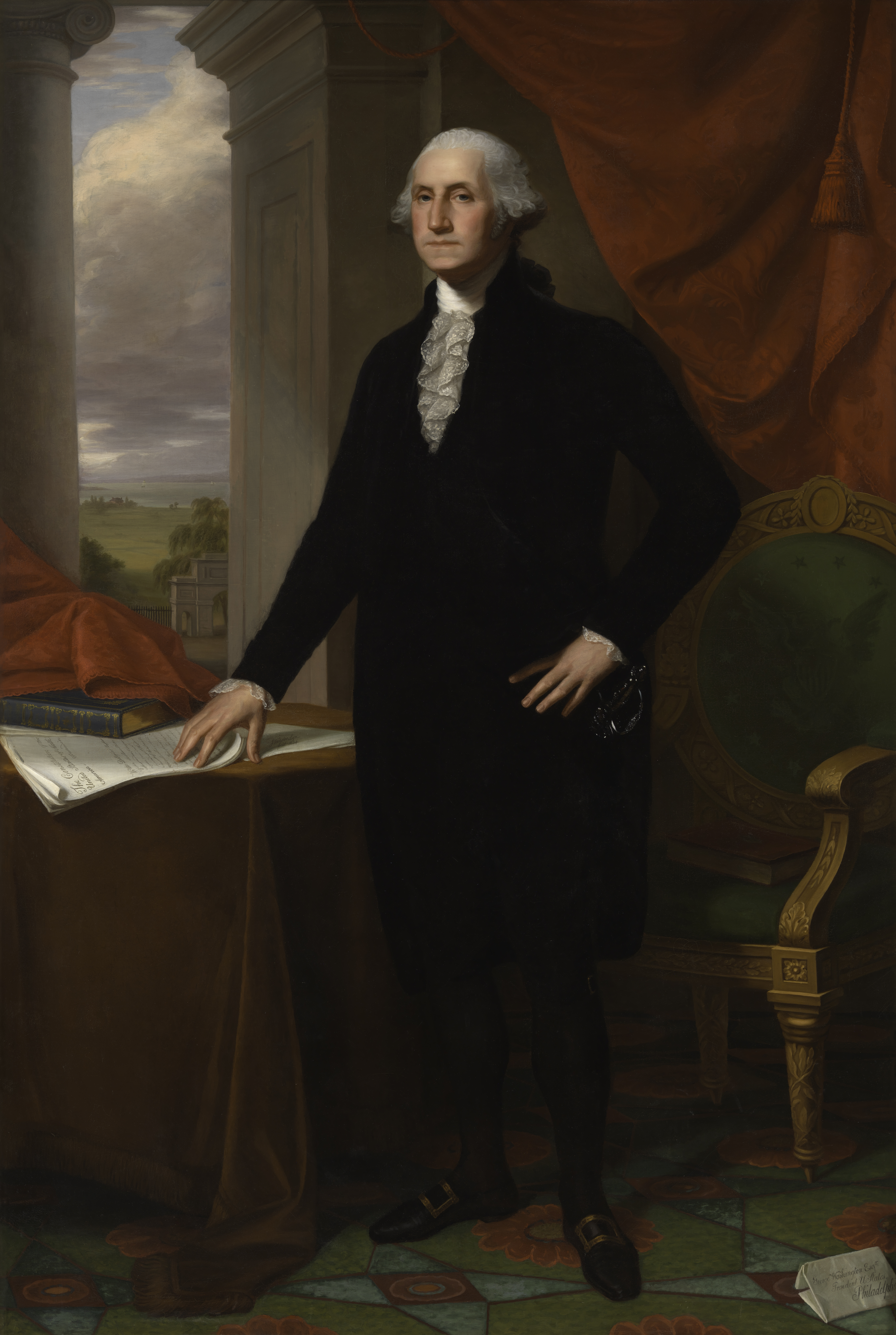
^{U.S. House of Representatives}
Portrait of George Washington, c. 1834

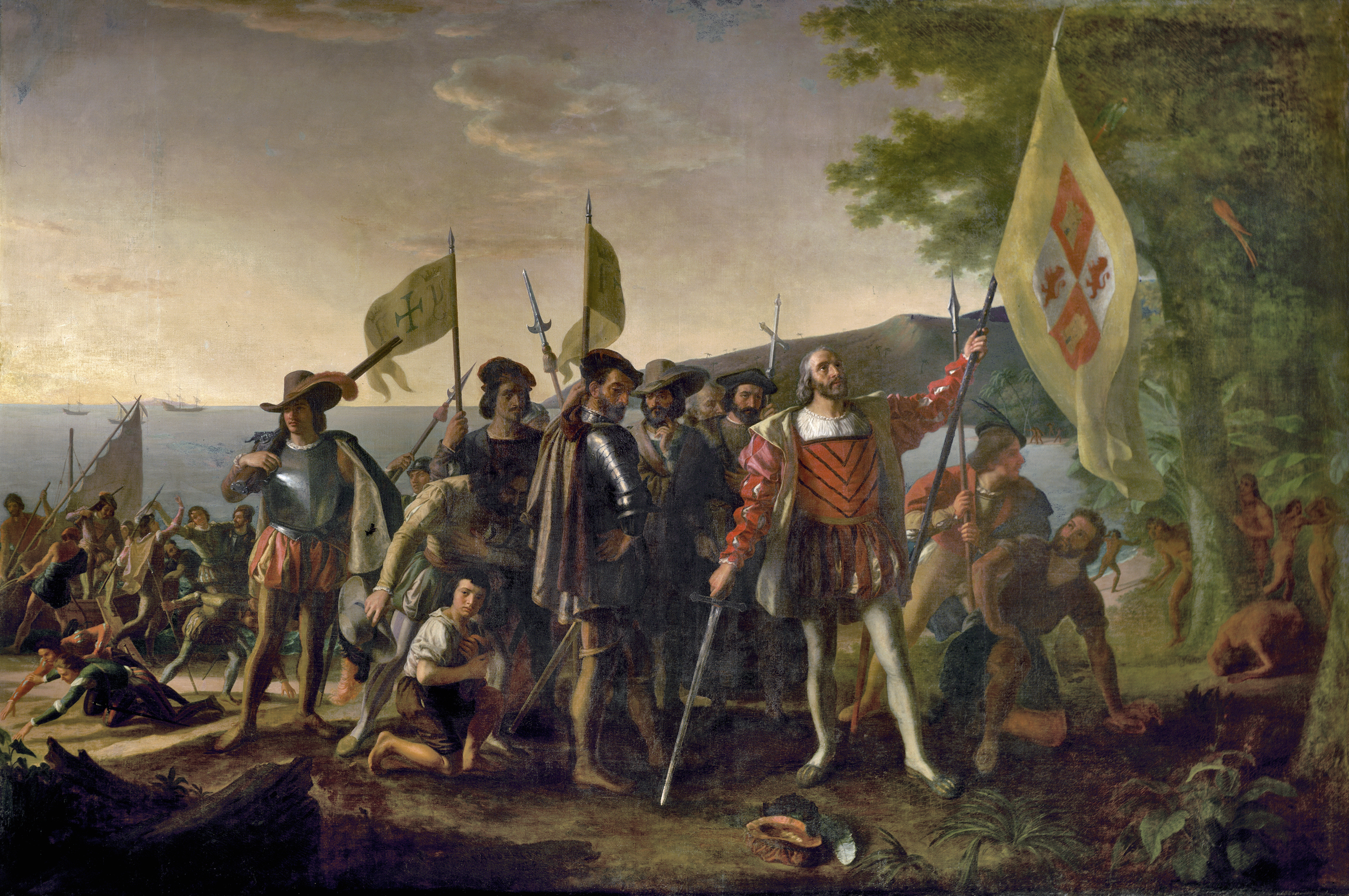
^{Birmingham Museum of Art}
Landing of Columbus, c. 1847
