= Salon of 1804 =

1804 art exhibition in Paris

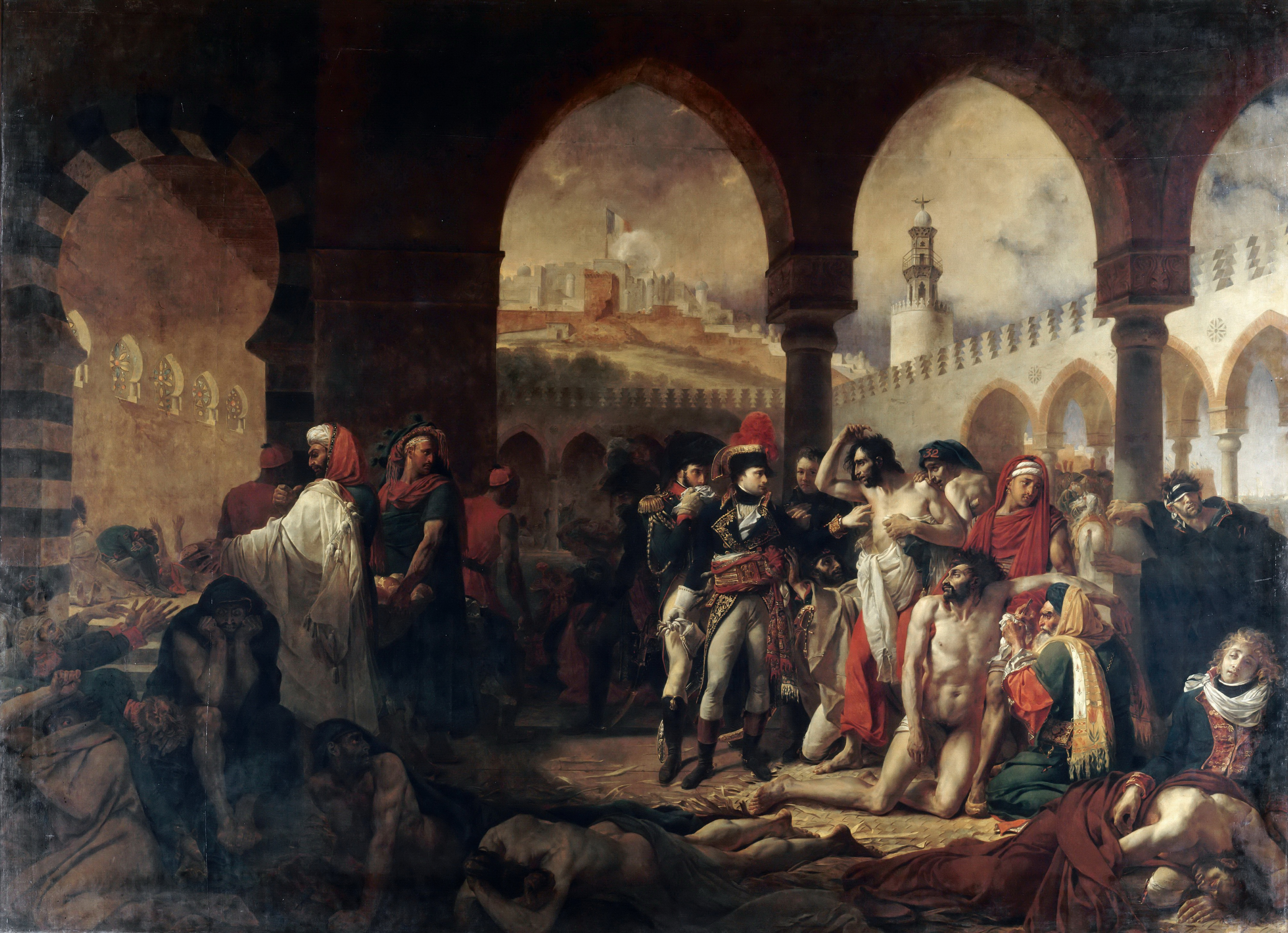
Bonaparte Visiting the Plague Victims of Jaffa by Antoine-Jean Gros

The Salon of 1804 was an art exhibition held at the Louvre in Paris which opened on 18 September 1804 and closed on 22 January 1805. It was held the same year that Napoleon Bonaparte was proclaimed Emperor of the French, and that the First French Empire was created. The Salon featured paintings, sculptures, prints and architectural designs from leading practicing artists of the Napoleonic era.

Antoine-Jean Gros exhibited the painting that later marked his rise to fame as an artist; Bonaparte Visiting the Plague Victims of Jaffa, a painting commissioned by the State to positively portray Bonaparte's actions at Jaffa during his Egyptian campaign (1798–1799). American artist John Vanderlyn returned with his first history painting, which depicted the killing of Jane McCrea during the American Revolutionary War. A sketch of the famous oil painting, The Battle of Mount Tabor by Louis-François Lejeune, was exhibited at this Salon; the finished piece is dated 1808.

Women exhibited in growing numbers at the Salon, and were between 7‍–‍15% of all exhibitors between 1801 and 1810. Angélique Mongez and Marie-Guillemine Benoist both won medals for their submissions; Mongez won first-class gold for her Alexander Mourning the Death of the Wife of Darius, while Benoist won a second-class medal, which led to many imperial commissions for her.

== Background ==
Opening on 18 September 1804, (Note: The catalogue gives the opening date in the French Republican calendar as the first complementary day of Year XII.) the Salon of 1804 was held only four months after the creation of the First French Empire. The museum in the Louvre was then called the Musée Napoléon, and had been run since the end of 1802 by its director general, Vivant Denon. The exhibition closed on 22 January 1805.

== Exhibits ==
Many of the works exhibited at the Salon were from pupils of the celebrated Jacques-Louis David, including Gros, Richard, Mongez, and Benoist.

This Salon marked the return of John Vanderlyn, a pupil of François-André Vincent, whose debut at the Salon of 1800 made him the first American artist to exhibit at a Salon, with the exhibition of his first history piece, The Death of Jane McCrea. Vanderlyn had returned to Paris from New York the year prior. He painted this work as an illustration for Joel Barlow's epic poem The Columbiad; it depicts the killing of Jane McCrea in 1777 by Native Americans allied with the British during the Revolutionary War of America.

The Painter's Workshop by Fleury François Richard

Antoine-Jean Gros was commissioned by Bonaparte (then First Consul) to create the propagandistic painting Bonaparte Visiting the Plague Victims of Jaffa, which made his reputation as a painter after Gros exhibited it at this Salon. Bonaparte had given him the subject in place of a painting of the Battle of Nazareth, a commission the painter had won in a competition in 1801 but which was later cancelled. The oil painting portrayed Bonaparte visiting victims of the plague in the hospital at Jaffa on 11 March 1799, which was an attempt to positively spin events that took place during Napoleon's Egyptian campaign: the massacre of the town's Ottoman garrison after its surrender, and rumours that Bonaparte had ordered plague-stricken French soldiers to be poisoned. The painting was acclaimed from the opening day. Gros, who was suffering from rheumatism, missed the opening, but found his work decorated with palms and laurels by his pupils, friends and visitors, and a banquet was held in his honour.

A sketch of Louis-François Lejeune's The Battle of Mount Tabor was exhibited at this Salon; the finished piece, now at the Palace of Versailles, is dated 1808. (Note: Allégret says the painting itself was shown, and won Lejeune a gold medal.) Lejeune also showed sketches of the battles of Lodi and Aboukir.

Fleury François Richard sent four paintings that were much admired, among them Charles VII Writing His Farewell to Agnès Sorel, Francis I and the Queen of Navarre and The Painter's Workshop. He had been Joséphine's favourite painter since he exhibited Valentine of Milan Mourning Her Husband the Duke of Orléans at the Salon of 1802, and his work marked the rise of the Troubadour style, which remained in fashion until about 1820.

Sketch drawn by Monsaldy of Mongez's award-winning submission

Women exhibited in growing numbers at the Salon, and were between 7–15% of all exhibitors between 1801 and 1810. From 1802, Napoleon's wife Joséphine bought works by women directly from the Salon. Marie-Guillemine Benoist showed five portraits and A Young Girl Singing to Distract Her Old Blind Father at this Salon and won a second-class medal, (Note: The French Ministry of Culture calls it a gold medal.) which led to many imperial commissions, including official images of Napoleon for several towns. Angélique Mongez, the first woman to exhibit a large history painting at the Salon and a pupil of both Jean-Baptiste Regnault and David, submitted Alexander Mourning the Death of the Wife of Darius, which was awarded a gold medal. However, the critic Jacques-Philippe Voïart found it too focused on the women in the scene and not enough on Alexander. The original is lost without photograph, but French engraver Antoine Maxime Monsaldy drew a sketch of the piece with the intent of creating an engraving to represent the Salon of 1804—while the engraving never came to be, the sketch remains as a record of Mongez's original painting.

In the months before the Salon, from April 1804, the press debated whether a statue of Bonaparte by Antoine-Denis Chaudet, voted by the Corps législatif to honour him for his newly established Civil Code, should show him nude. Denon argued in the Journal des arts for the side of nudity, citing the statues of antiquity, as did a group of artists who published a letter supporting him, while other correspondents held that the statue should show Bonaparte in the clothes he actually wore.

== Gallery ==
=== Paintings ===
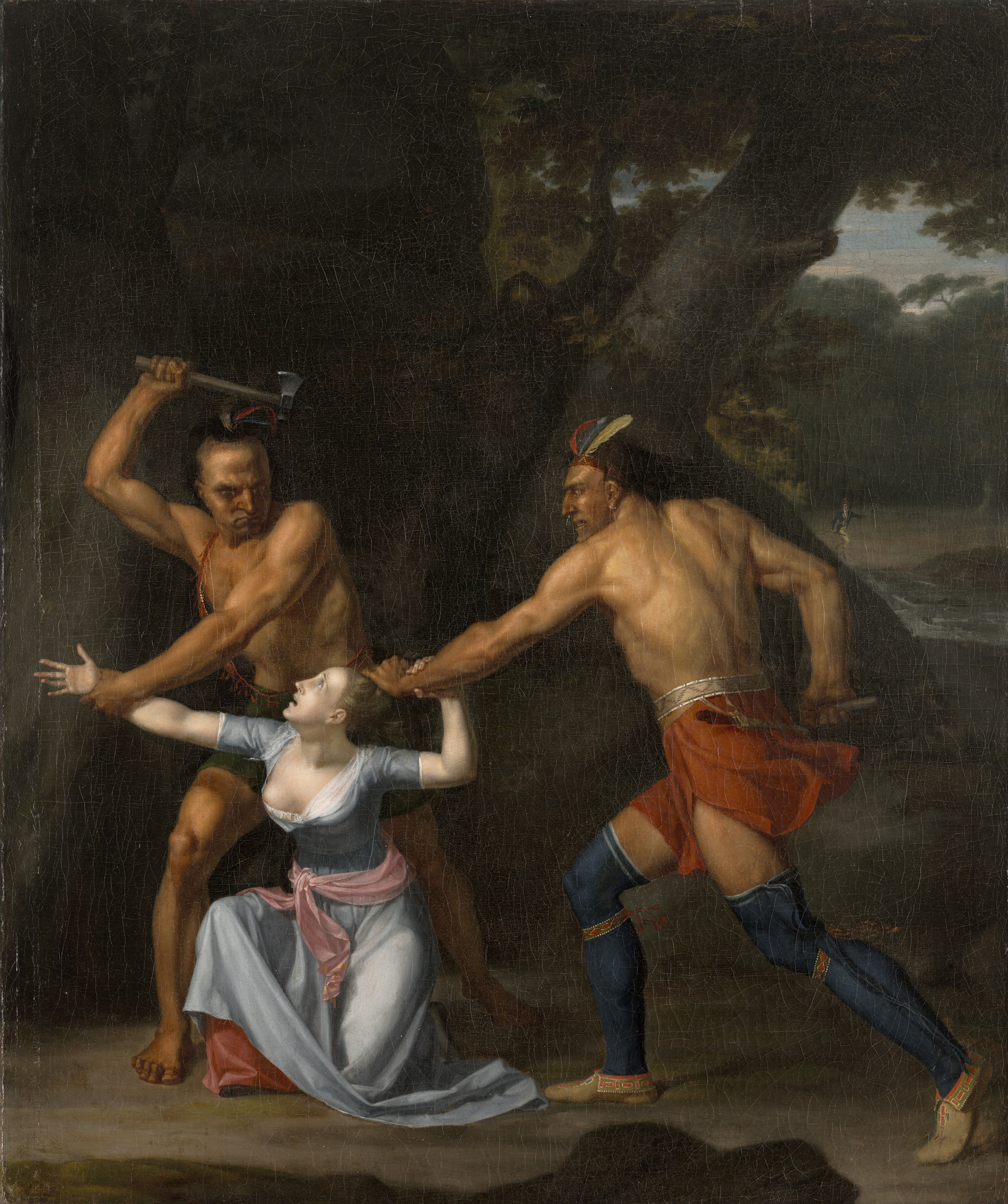
The Death of Jane McCrea by John Vanderlyn

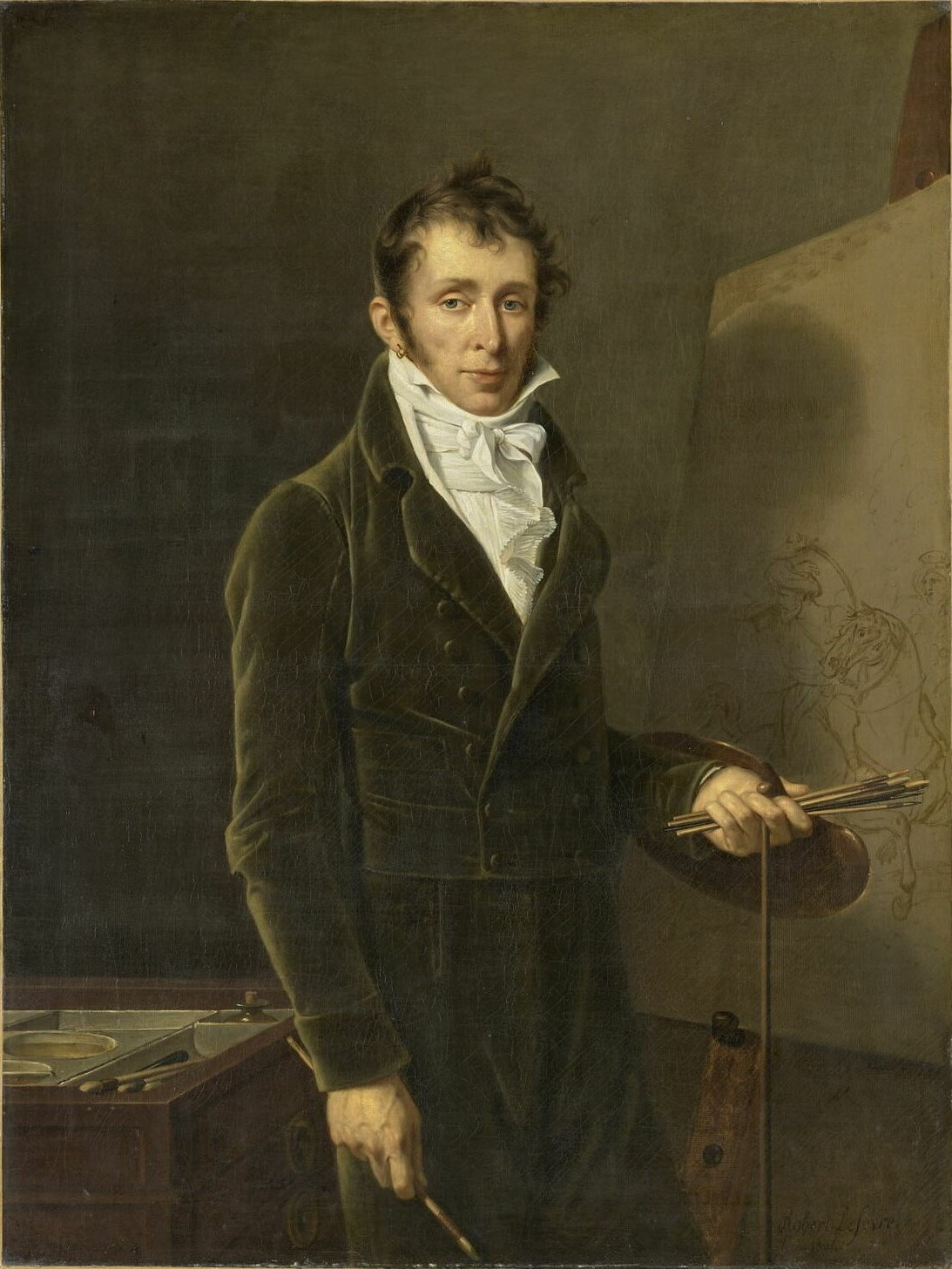
Portrait of Carle Vernet by Robert Lefèvre

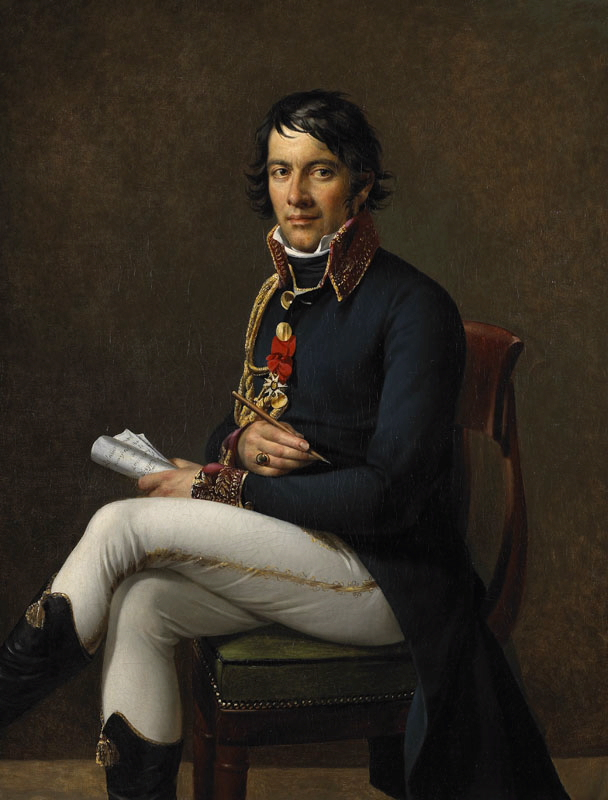
Portrait of Baron Larrey by Marie-Guillemine Benoist

A Young Girl Singing to Distract her Old Blind Father by Marie-Guillemine Benoist

Portrait of Mikołaj Gorgoniusz Mielżyński by Jean-Jacques-François Le Barbier

Portrait of Stanislas Myelzinski with his Wife and Child by Jean-Jacques-François Le Barbier

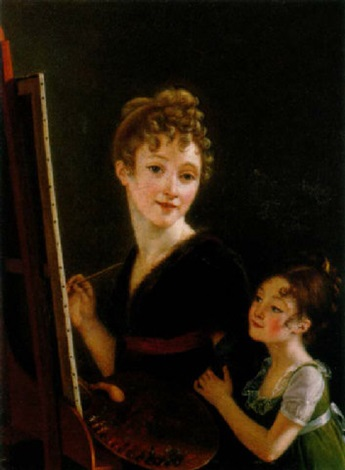
Self-Portrait at an Easel and With a Young Girl by Isabelle Pinson

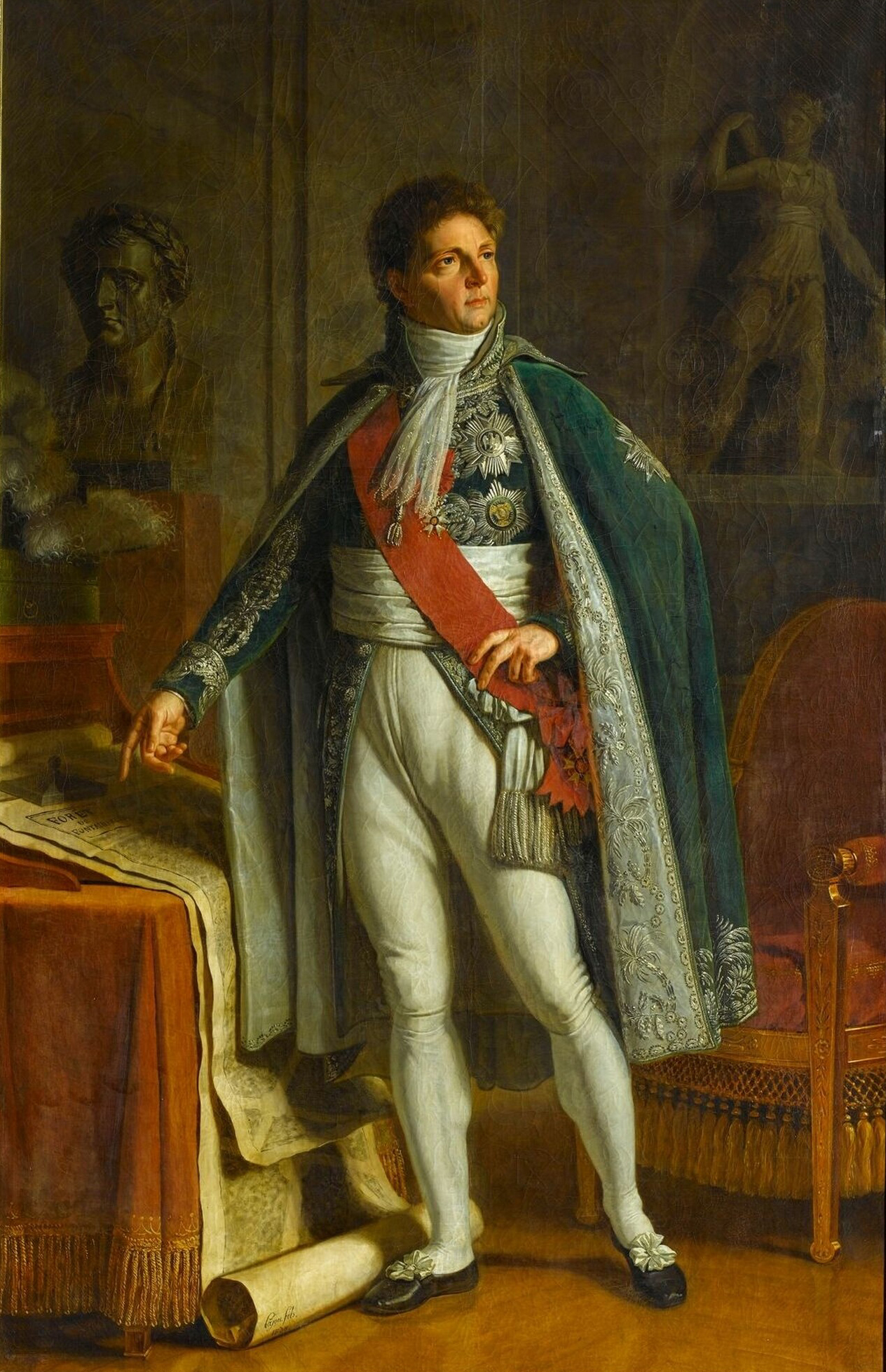
Portrait of Louis-Alexandre Berthier, Prince of Neufchâtel and Wagram, Marshal of France by Jacques-Augustin-Catherine Pajou

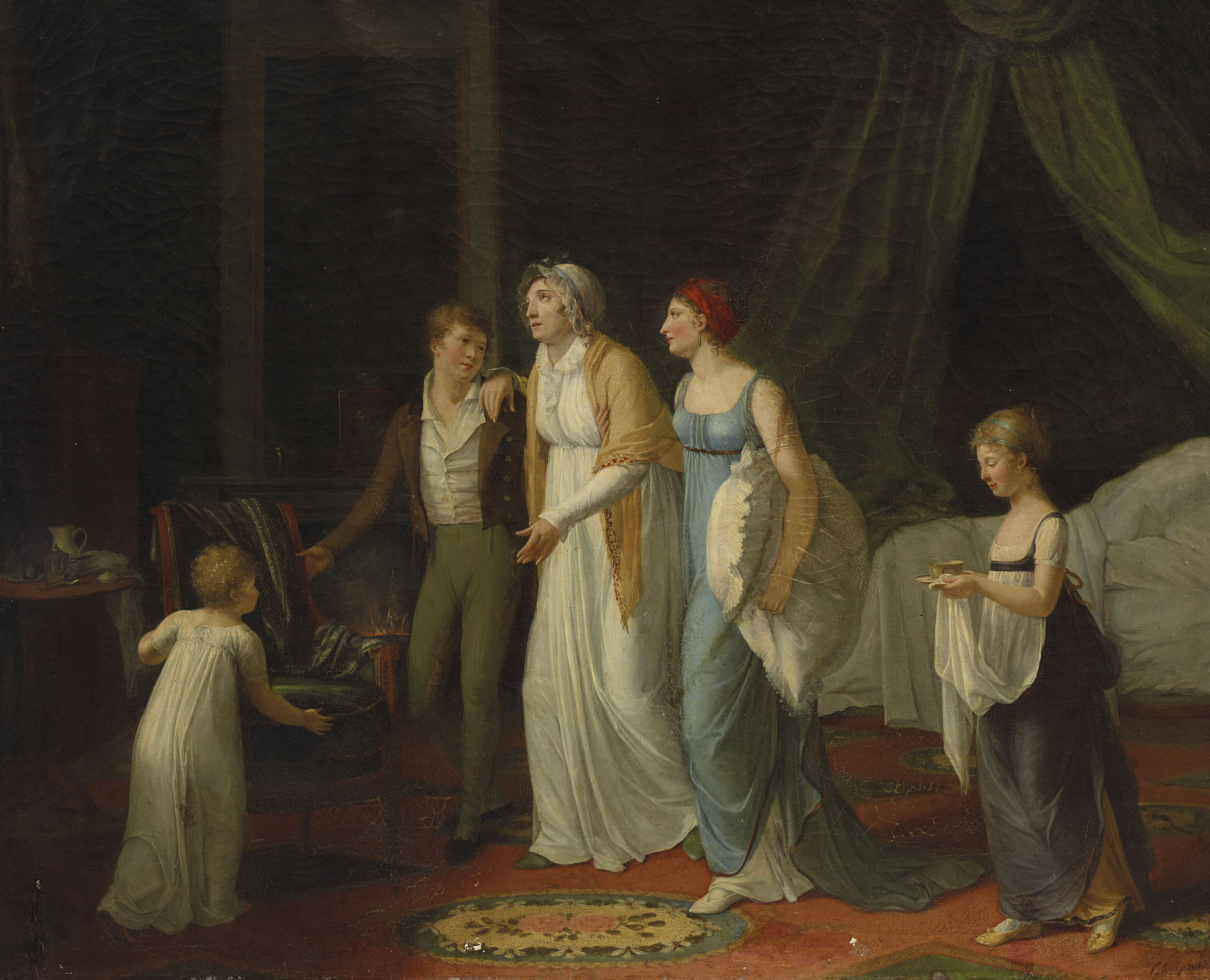
A Mother Recovering with the Help of her Children by Constance Charpentier

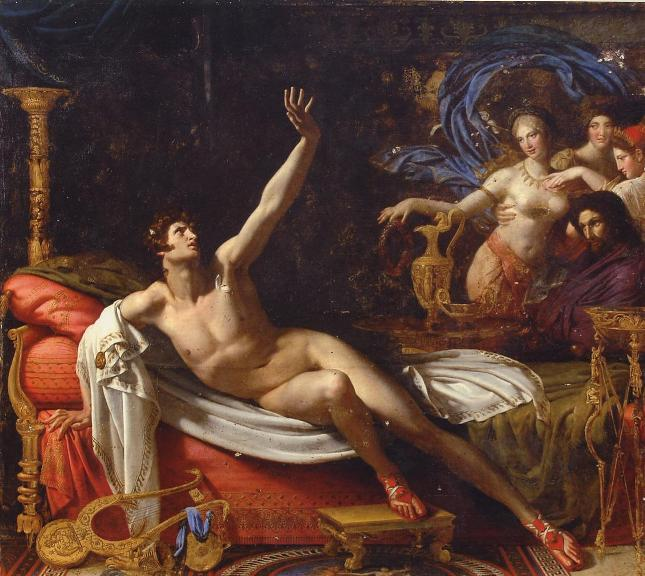
The Sword of Damocles by Antoine Dubost

Pastoral, subject taken from Gessner's Idyll of Amyntas by Antoine Dubost

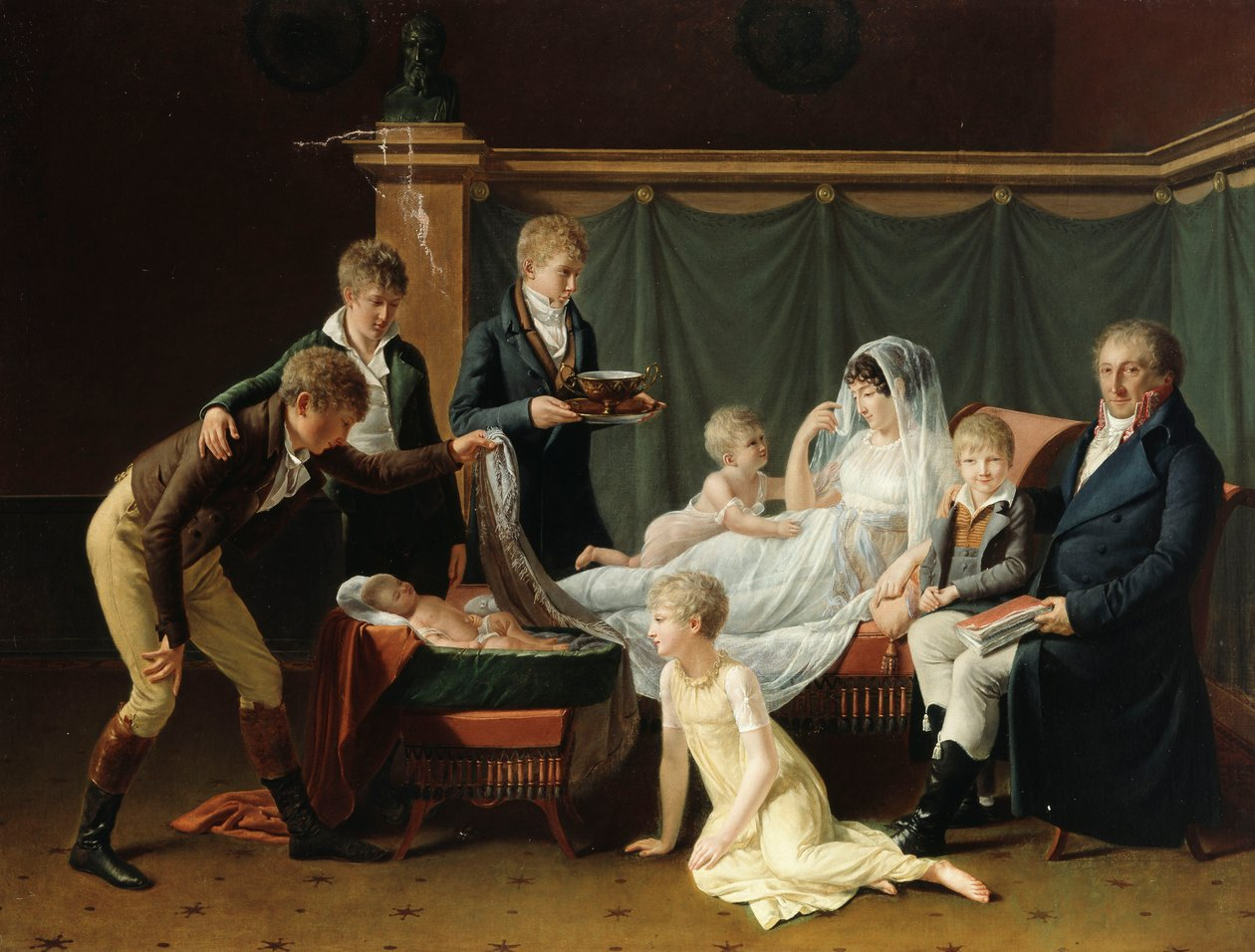
Portrait of the Marquis and Marquise de Cramayel and their seven Children in an Interior by Louis Ducis

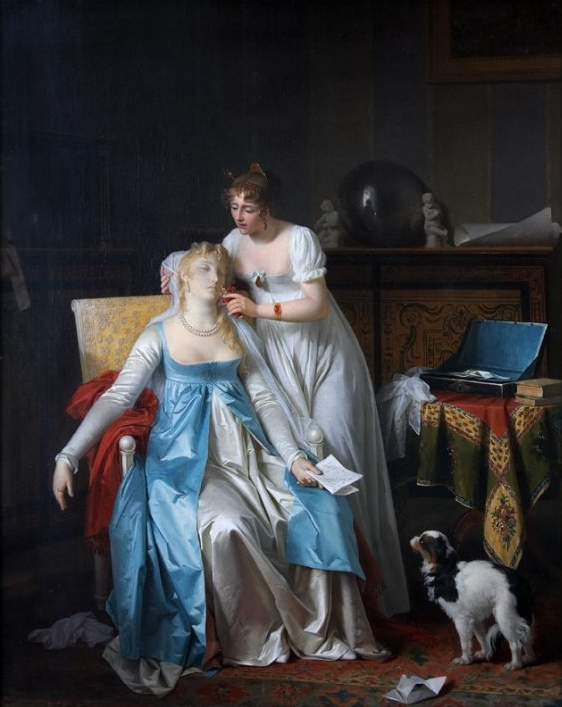
Bad News by Marguerite Gérard

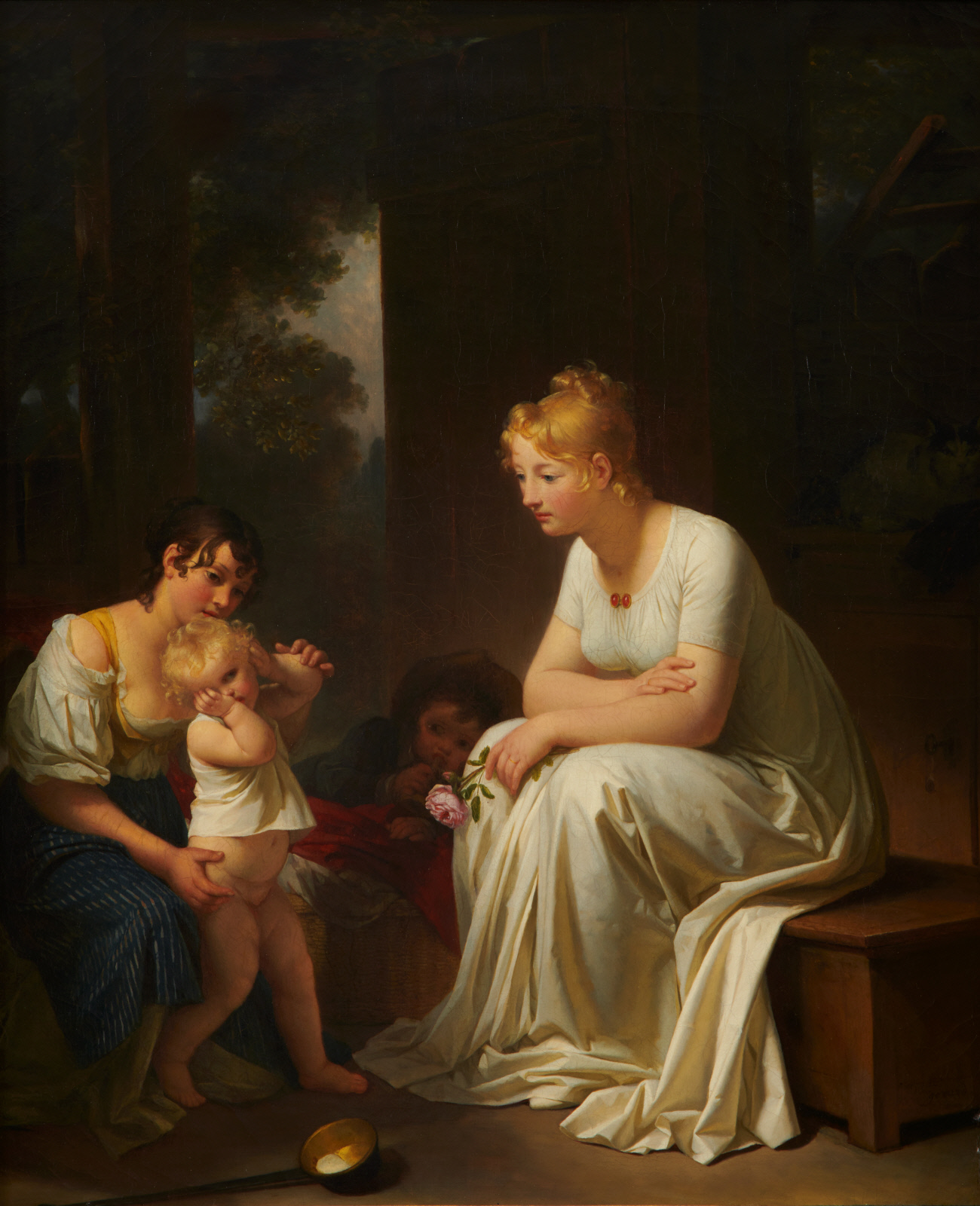
The Capricious Child by Marguerite Gérard

The Nursing Mother by Marguerite Gérard

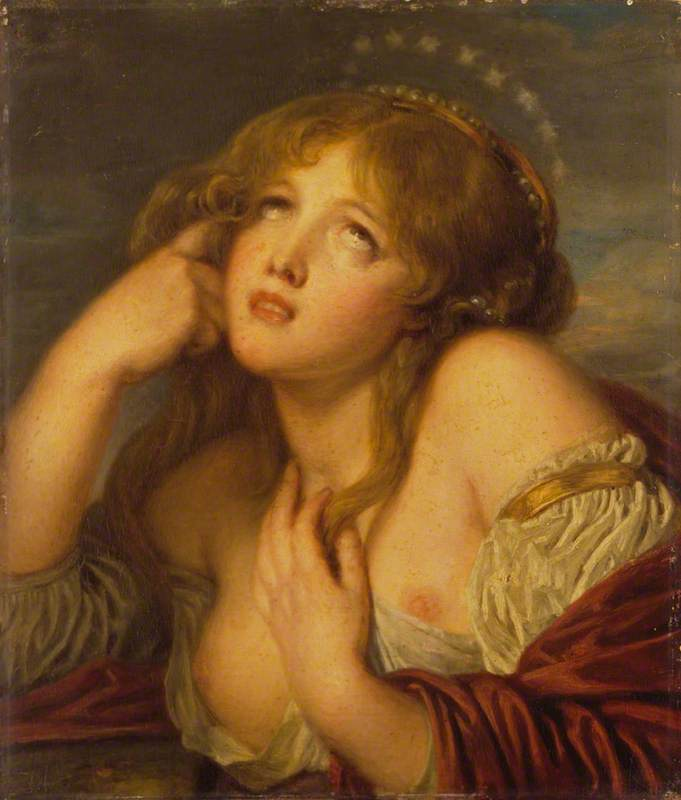
Ariadne by Jean-Baptiste Greuze

Portrait of Mr. Frion by Joseph-Marie Vien

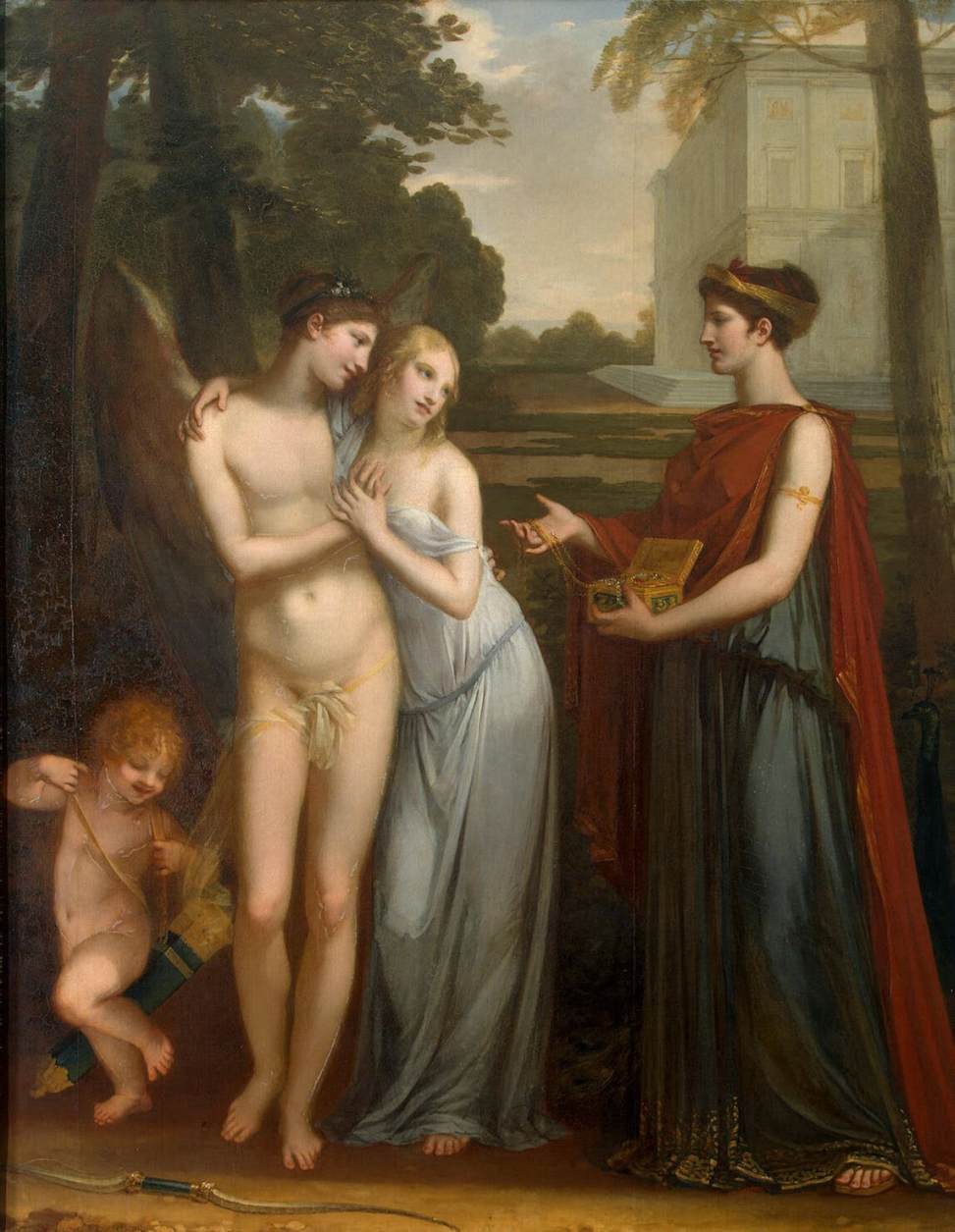
Innocence Preferring Love to Wealth by Constance Mayer

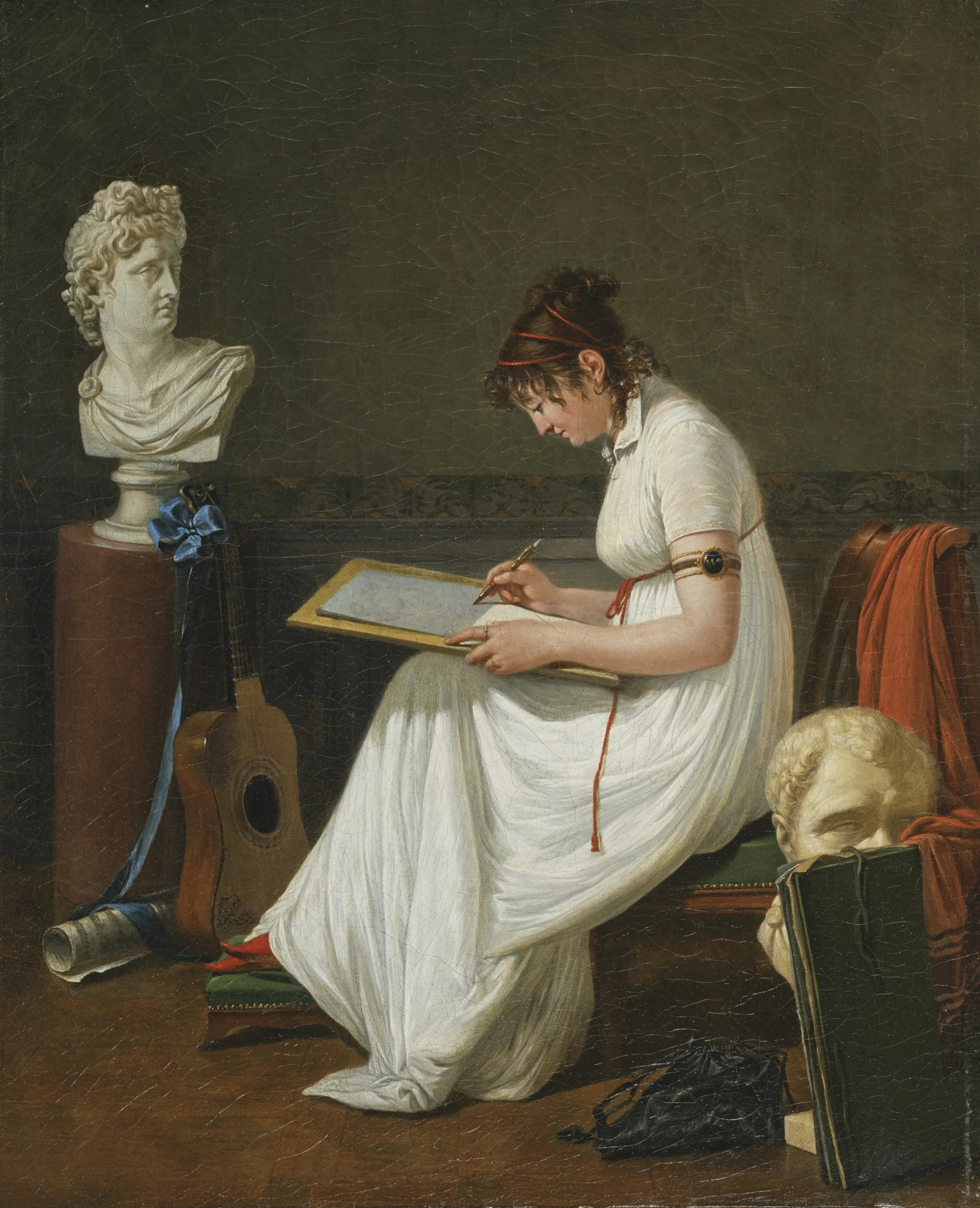
Portrait of an Artist drawing an Antique by Jean-François Sablet

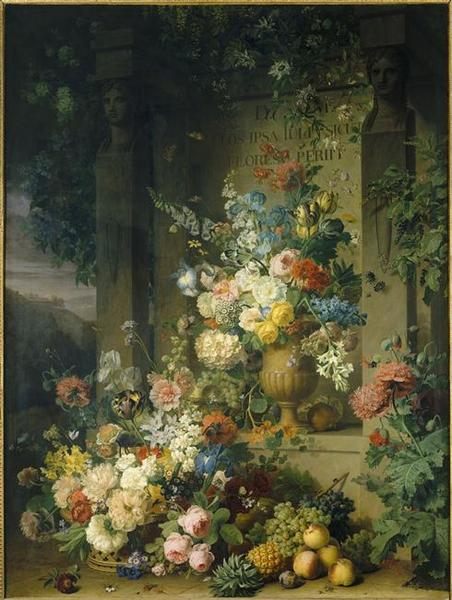
Julie's Tomb by Jan Frans van Dael

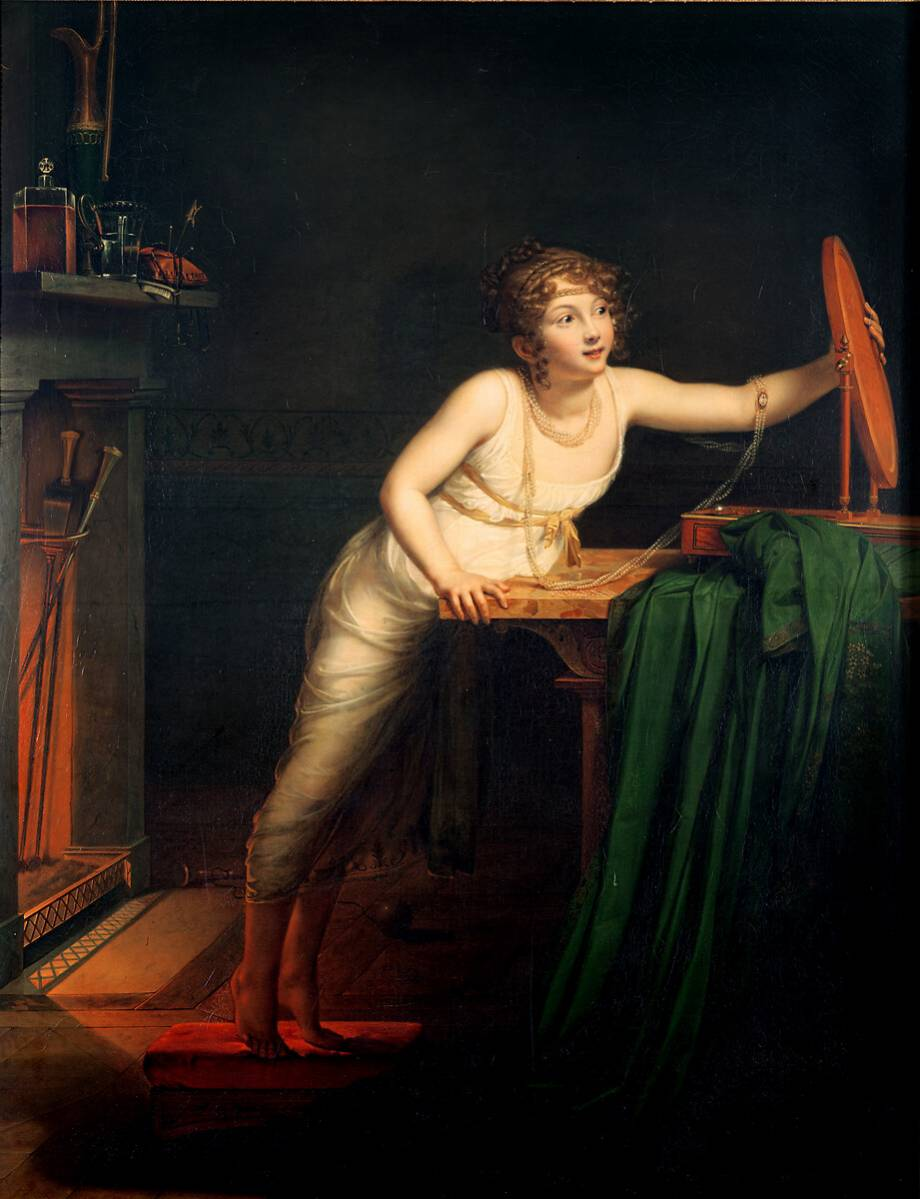
The First Sense of Coquetry by Pauline Auzou

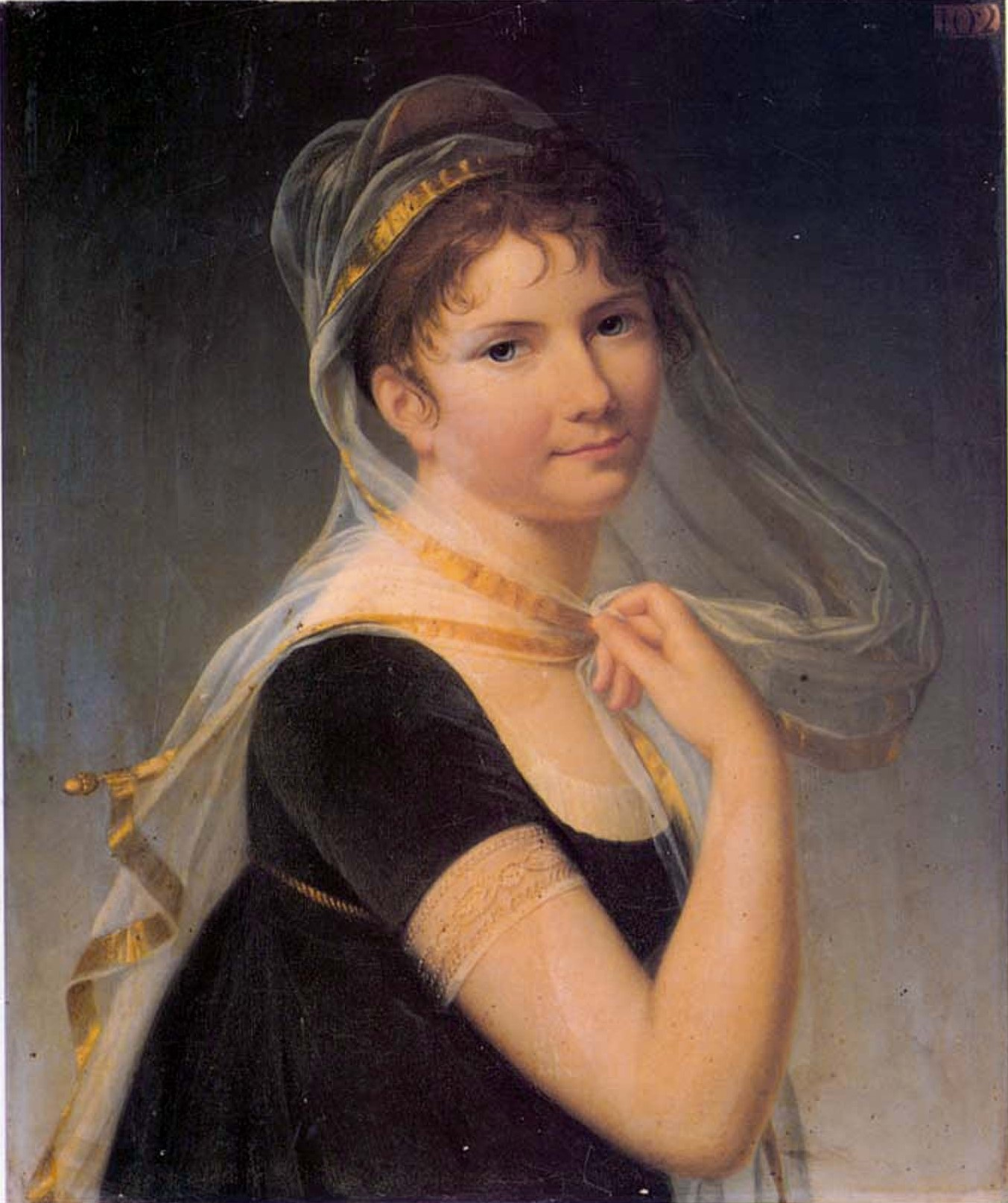
Portrait of Madame Augustin, née Madeleine-Pauline du Cruet de Barailhon by Jeanne-Elisabeth Chaudet

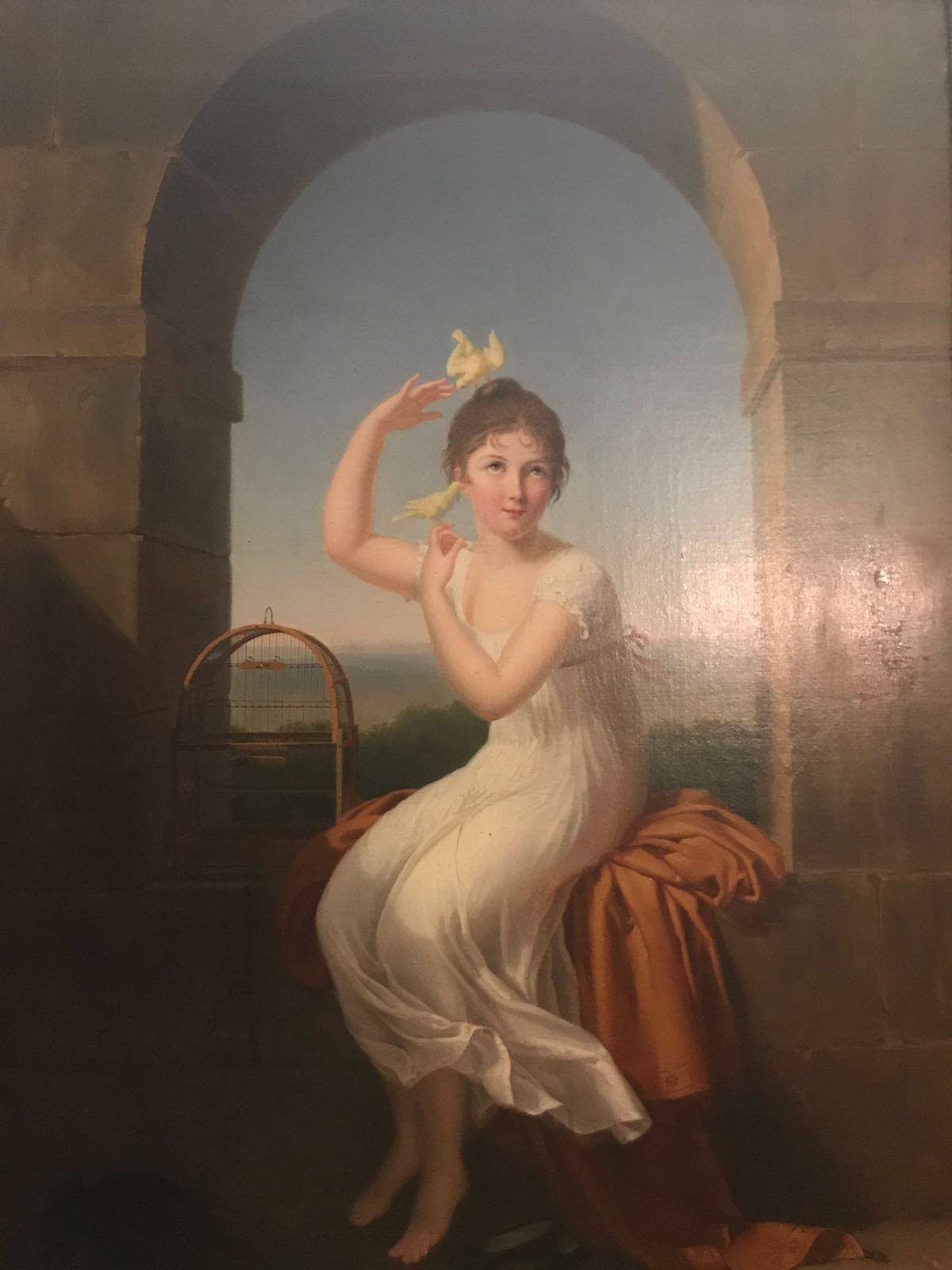
A Young Girl Playing with Canaries by Jeanne-Elisabeth Chaudet

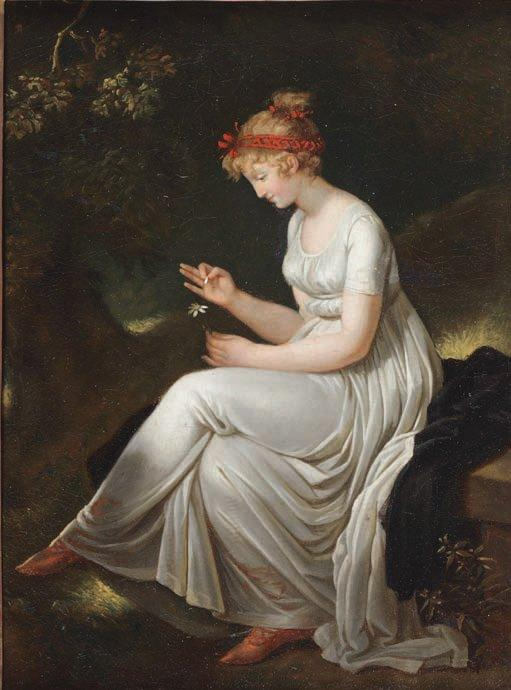
A Young Girl Trying to Read her Fate in a Daisy-Queen by Adèle Varillat

Young Woman Sitting in a Landscape by Adèle Varillat

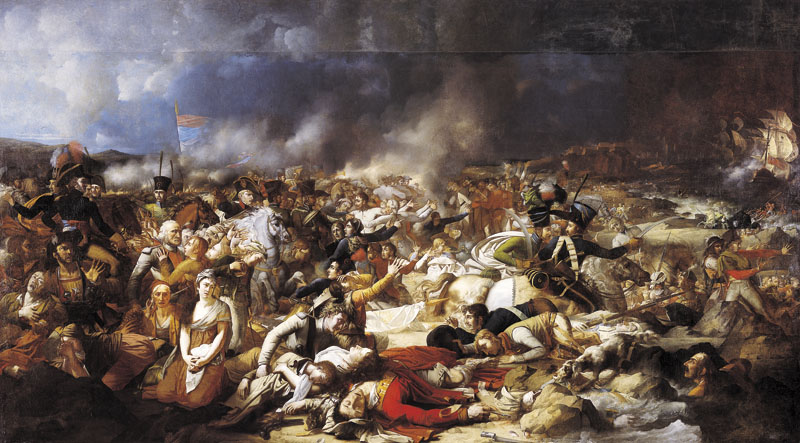
Battle of Quiberon by Philippe-Auguste Hennequin

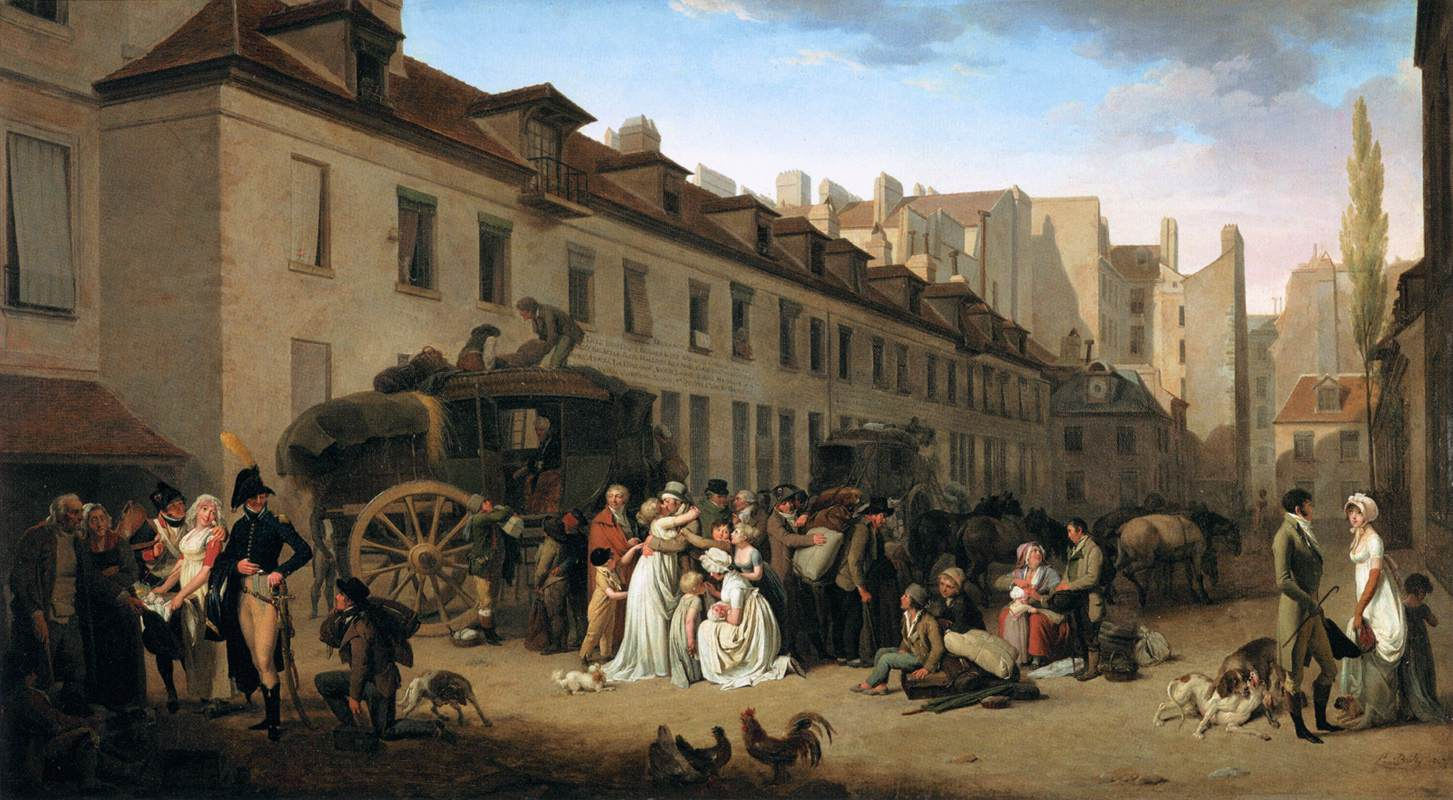
The Arrival of a Stage-coach in the Courtyard of the Messageries by Louis-Léopold Boilly

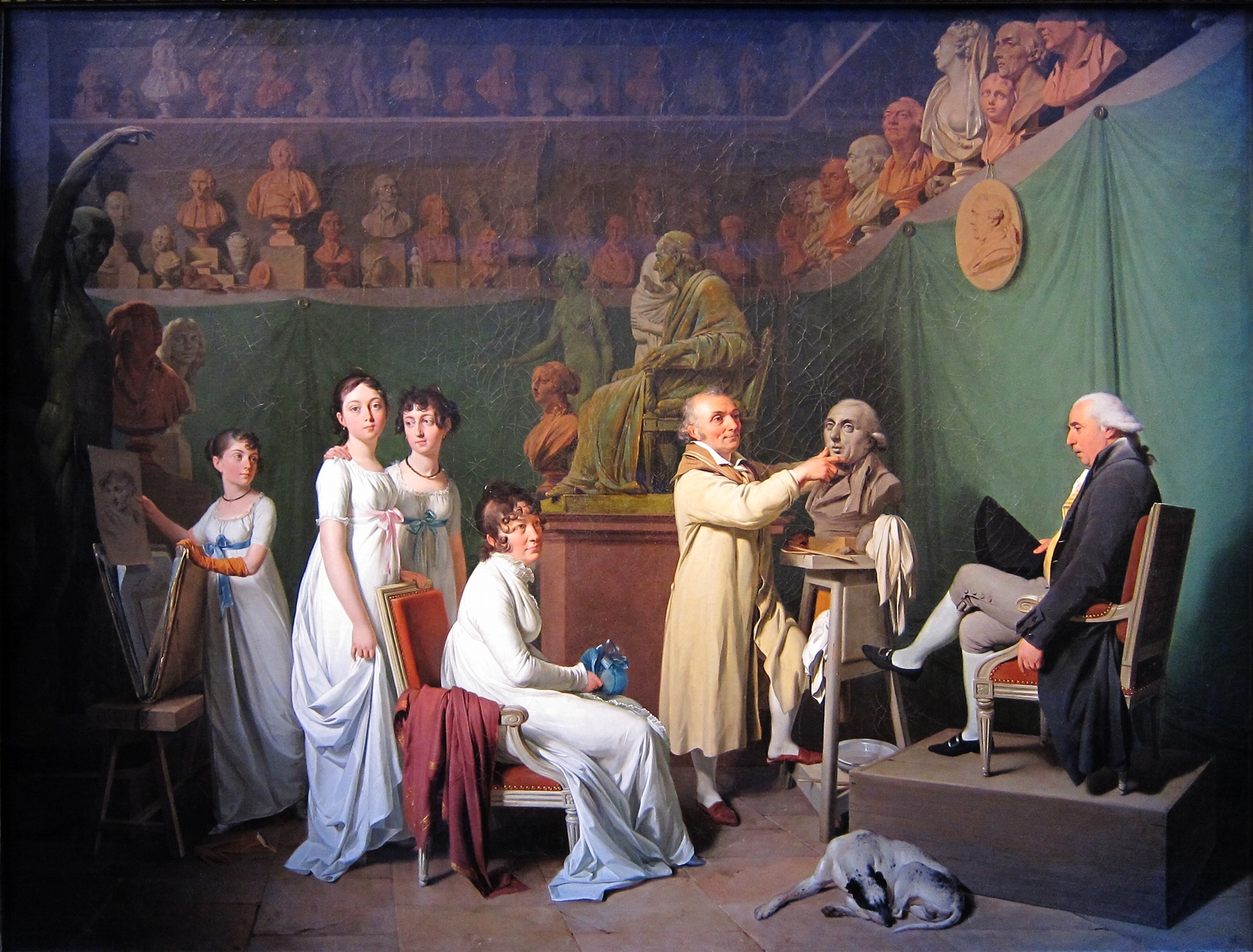
The Studio of Jean-Antoine Houdon, by Louis-Léopold Boilly

A Young Shepherdess by Jean Antoine Laurent

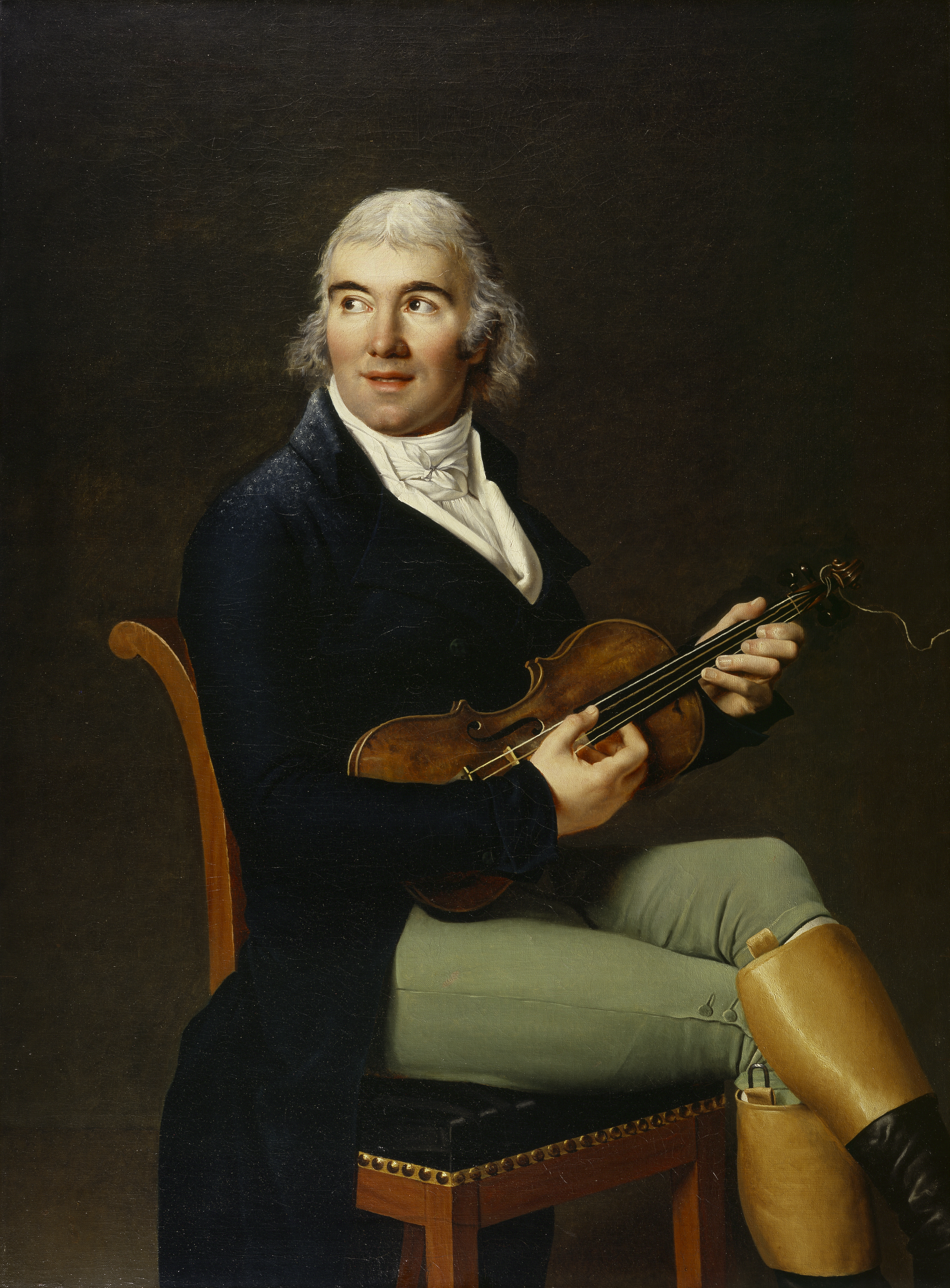
Portrait of Antonio Bartolomeo Bruni by Césarine Davin-Mirvault

Archimedes Coming out of the Bath by Jean-Jacques Lagrenée

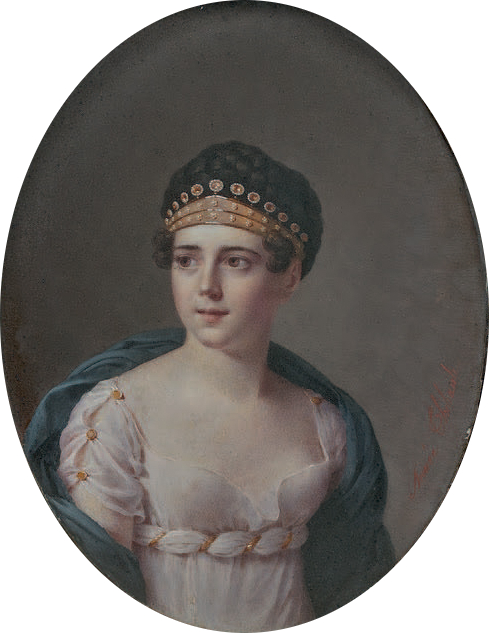
Portrait of Madame Giacomelli by Aimée Thibault

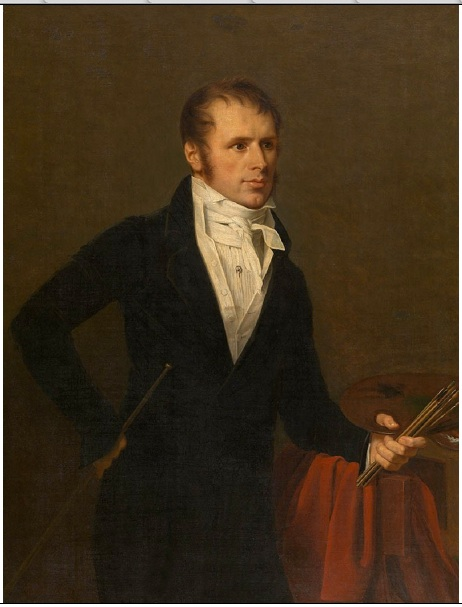
Portrait of Jan Frans van Dael by Robert Lefèvre

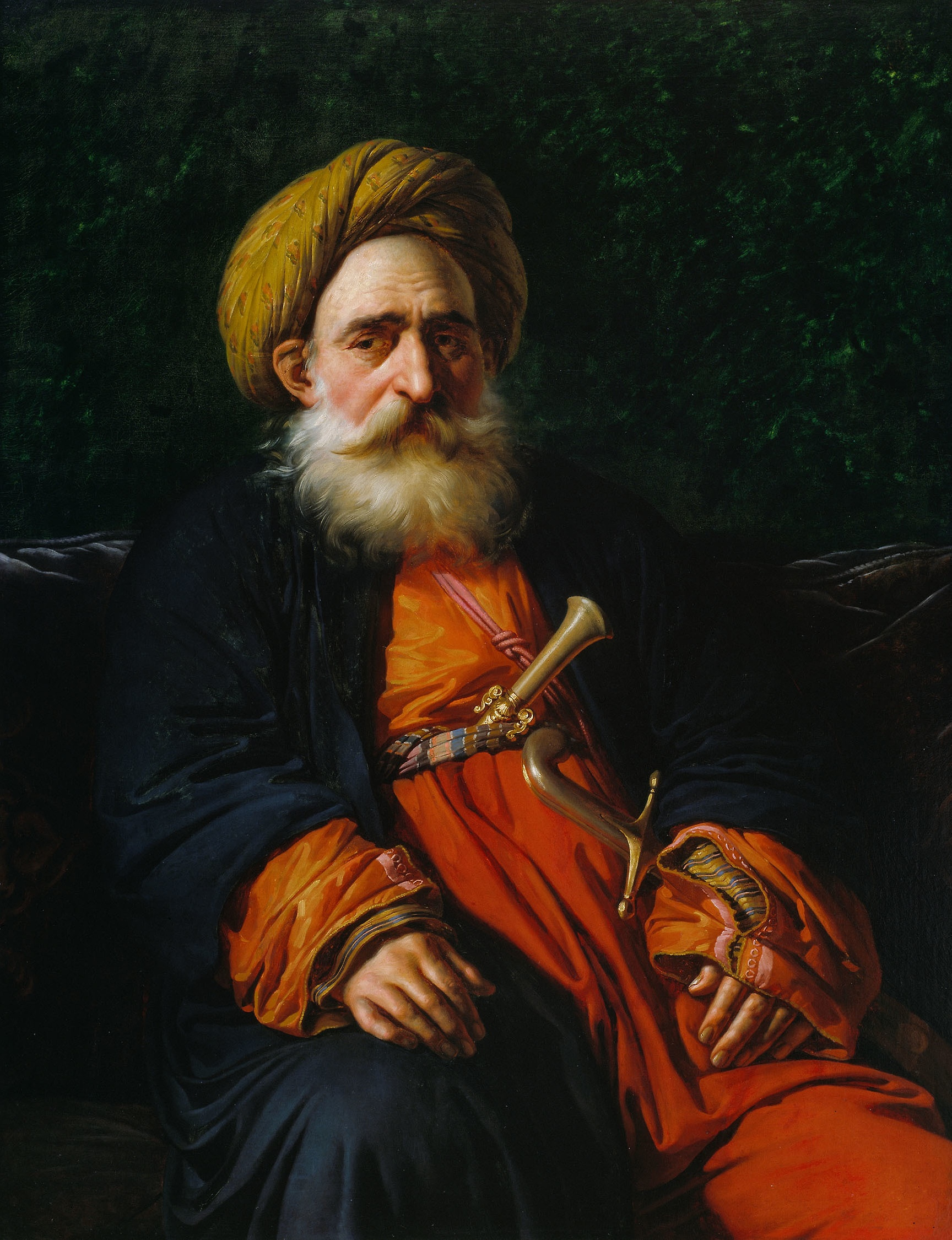
Portrait of the Katchef Dahouth, Christian Mameluke by Anne-Louis

Athaliah and Jehoash by José Aparicio

Portrait of Antoine Denis Chaudet by Jean-Baptiste Jacques Augustin

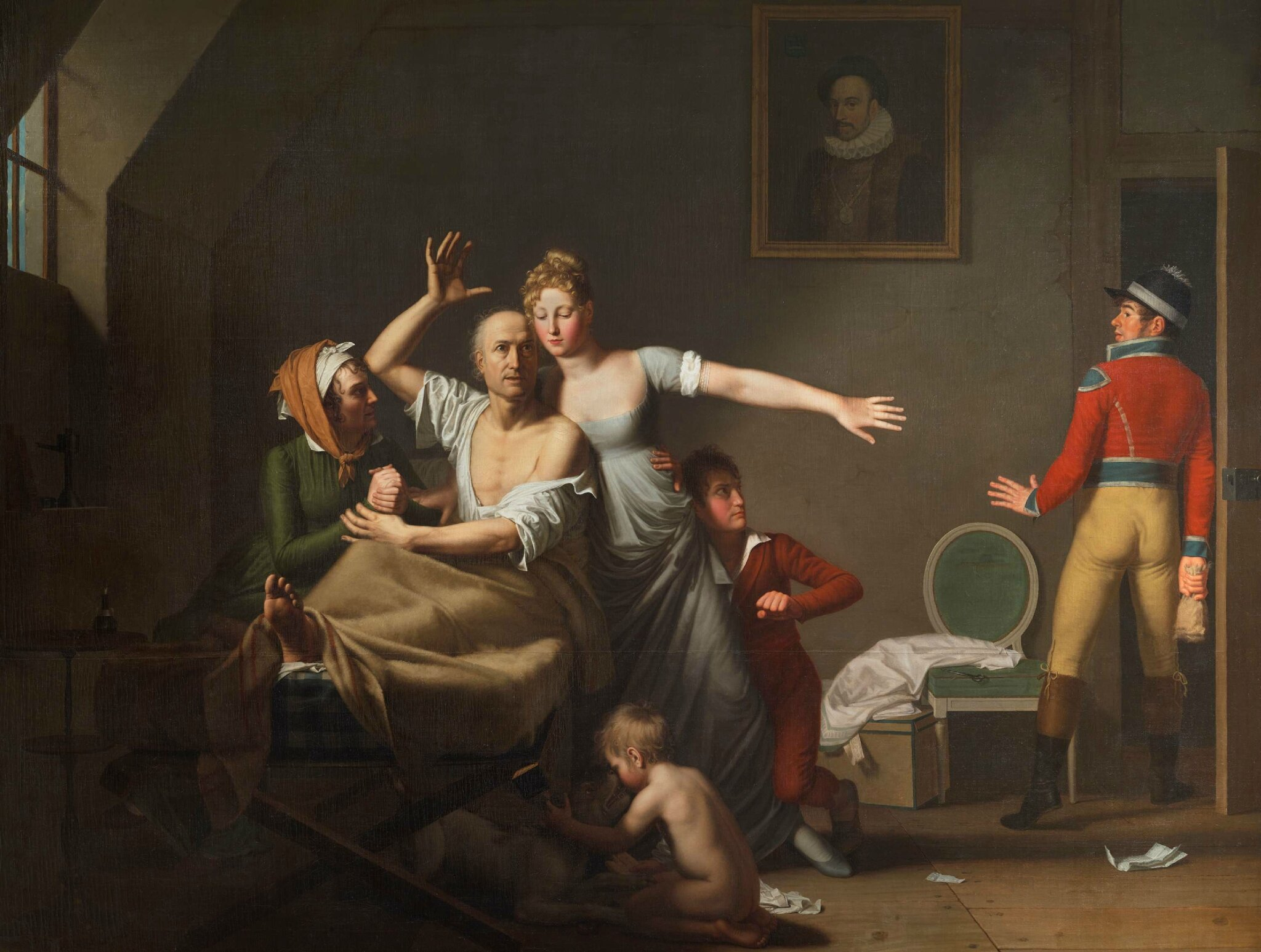
Indigence and Honour by Hilaire Ledru

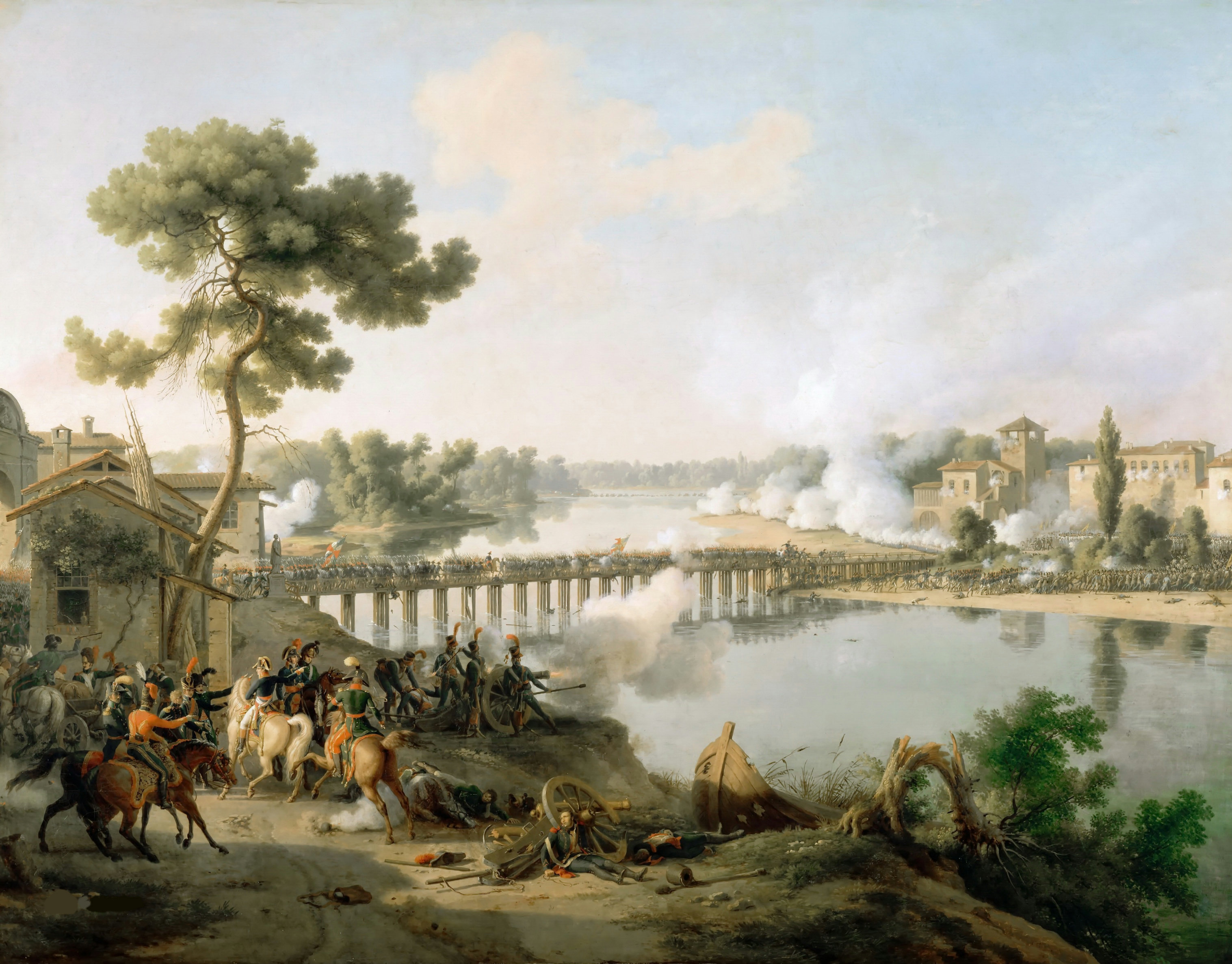
The Battle of Lodi by Louis-François Lejeune

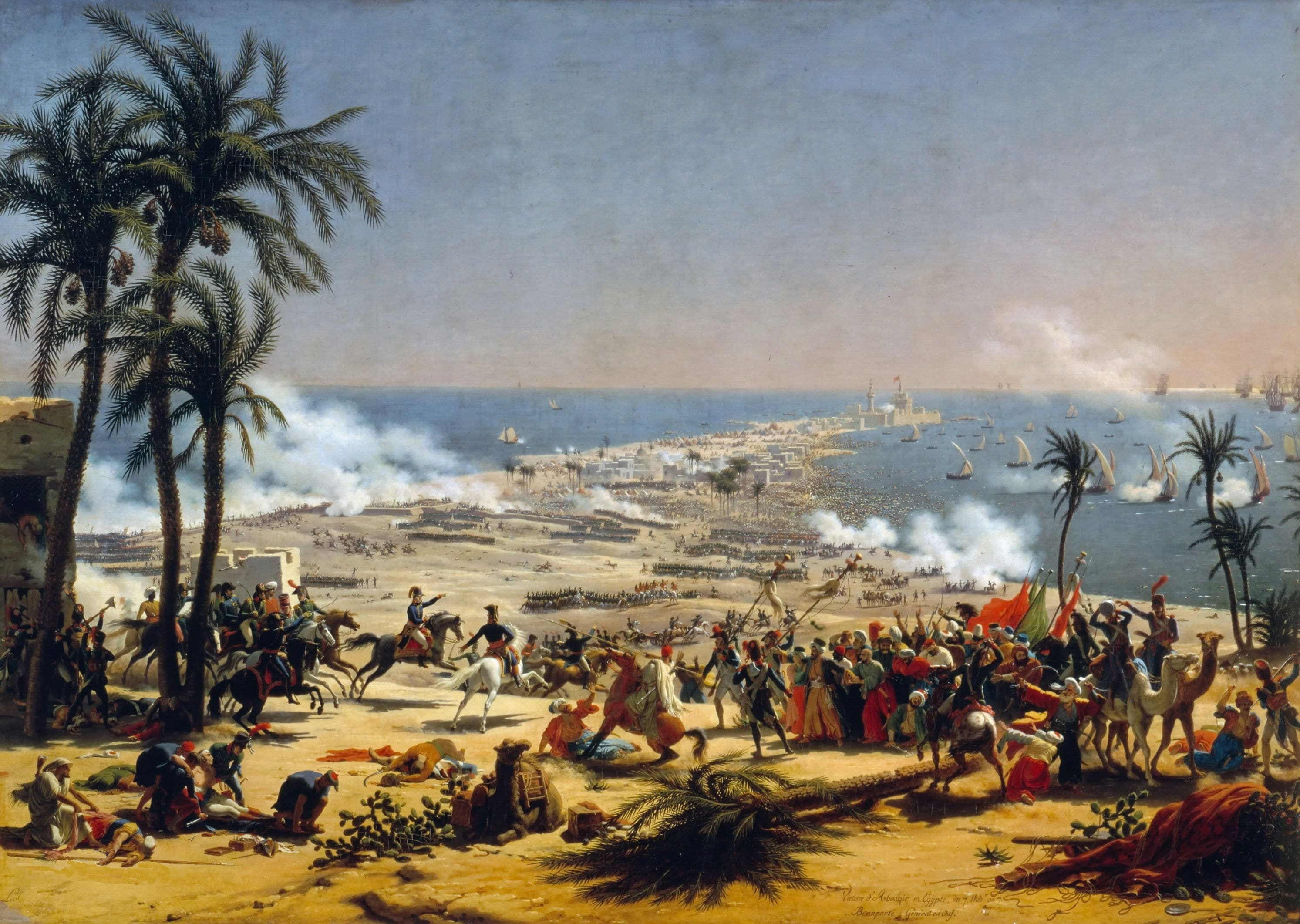
The Battle of Aboukir by Louis-François Lejeune

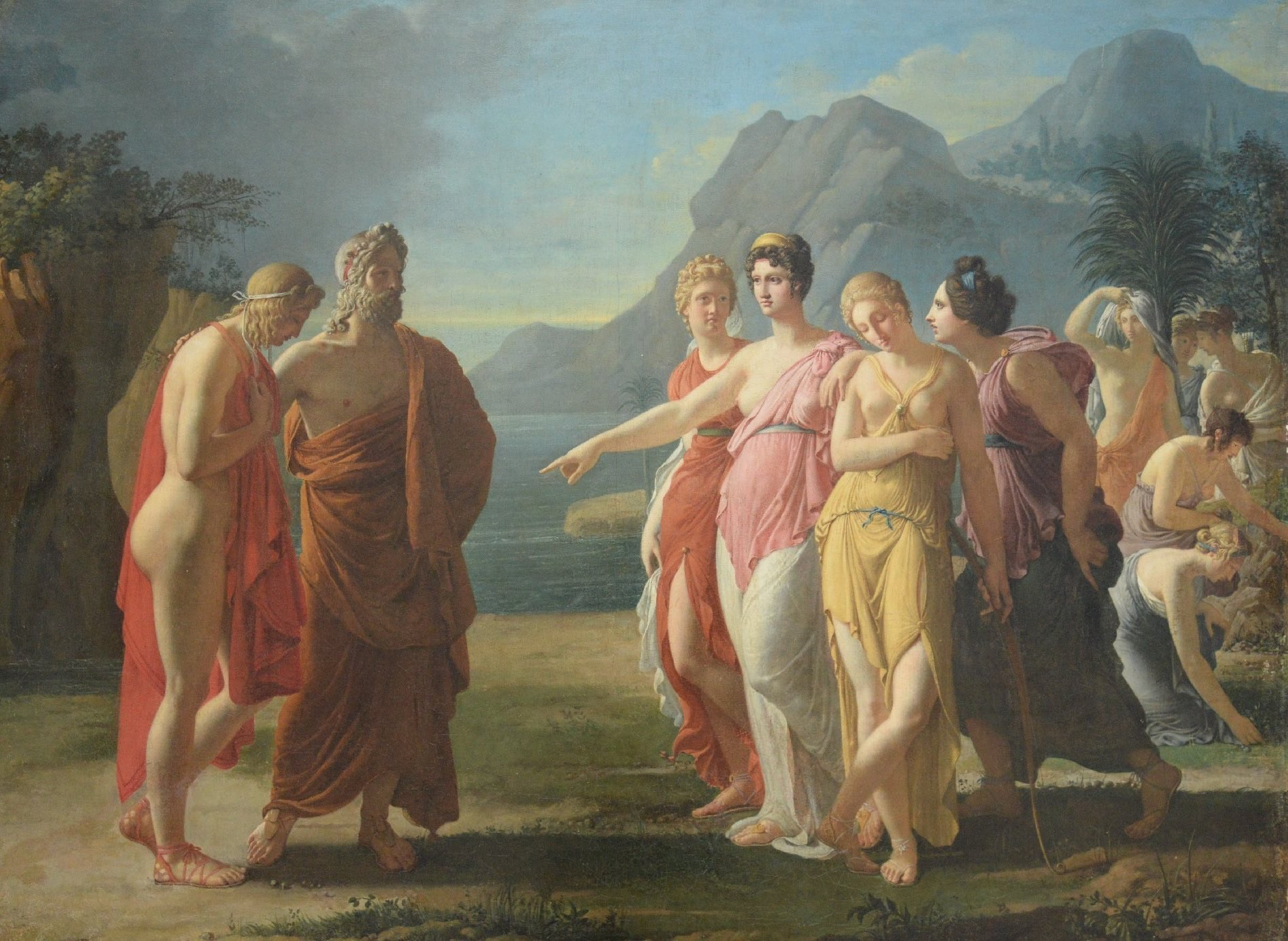
Calypso Receiving Telemachus and Mentor on her Island by Pierre Edme Louis Pellier

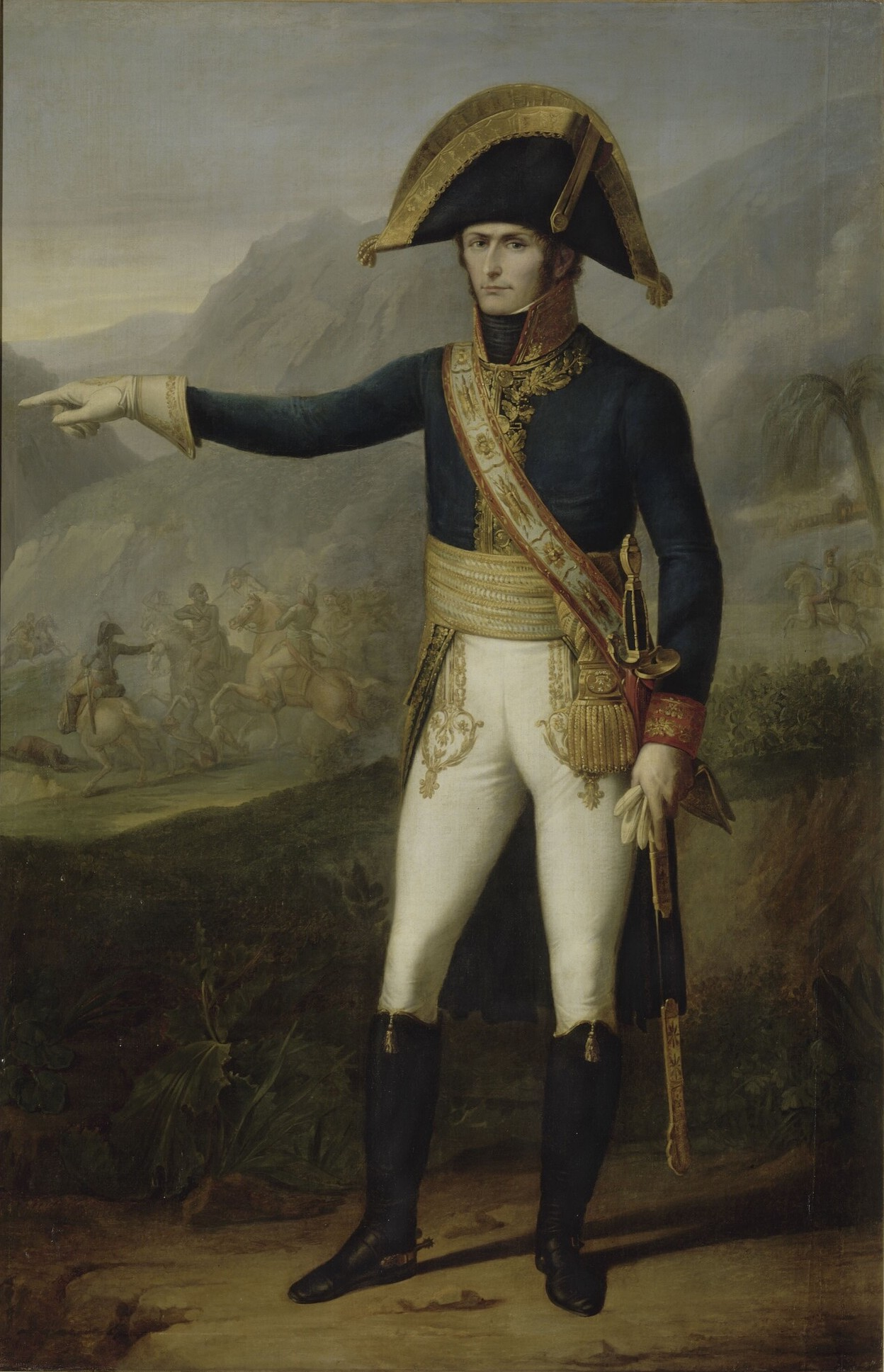
Portrait of General-in-chief Charles Leclerc by François Kinson

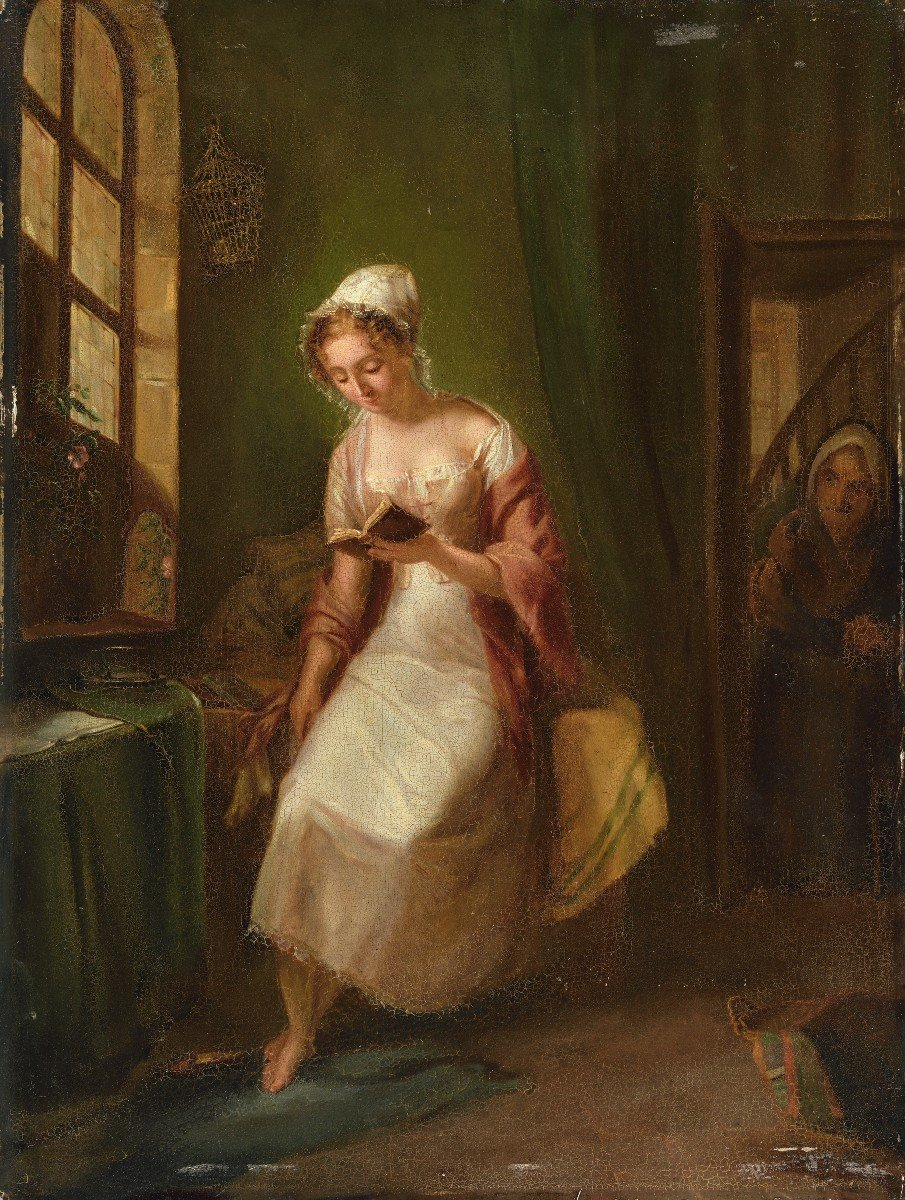
The Lazy Woman by Jeanne Bernard Dabos

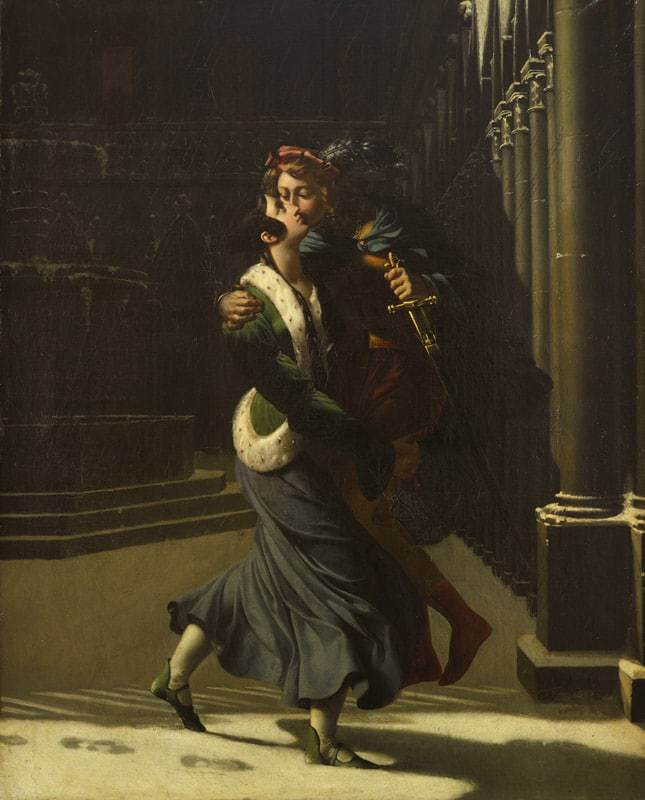
Emma and Eginhard, or The Stratagems of Love by Pierre-August Vafflard

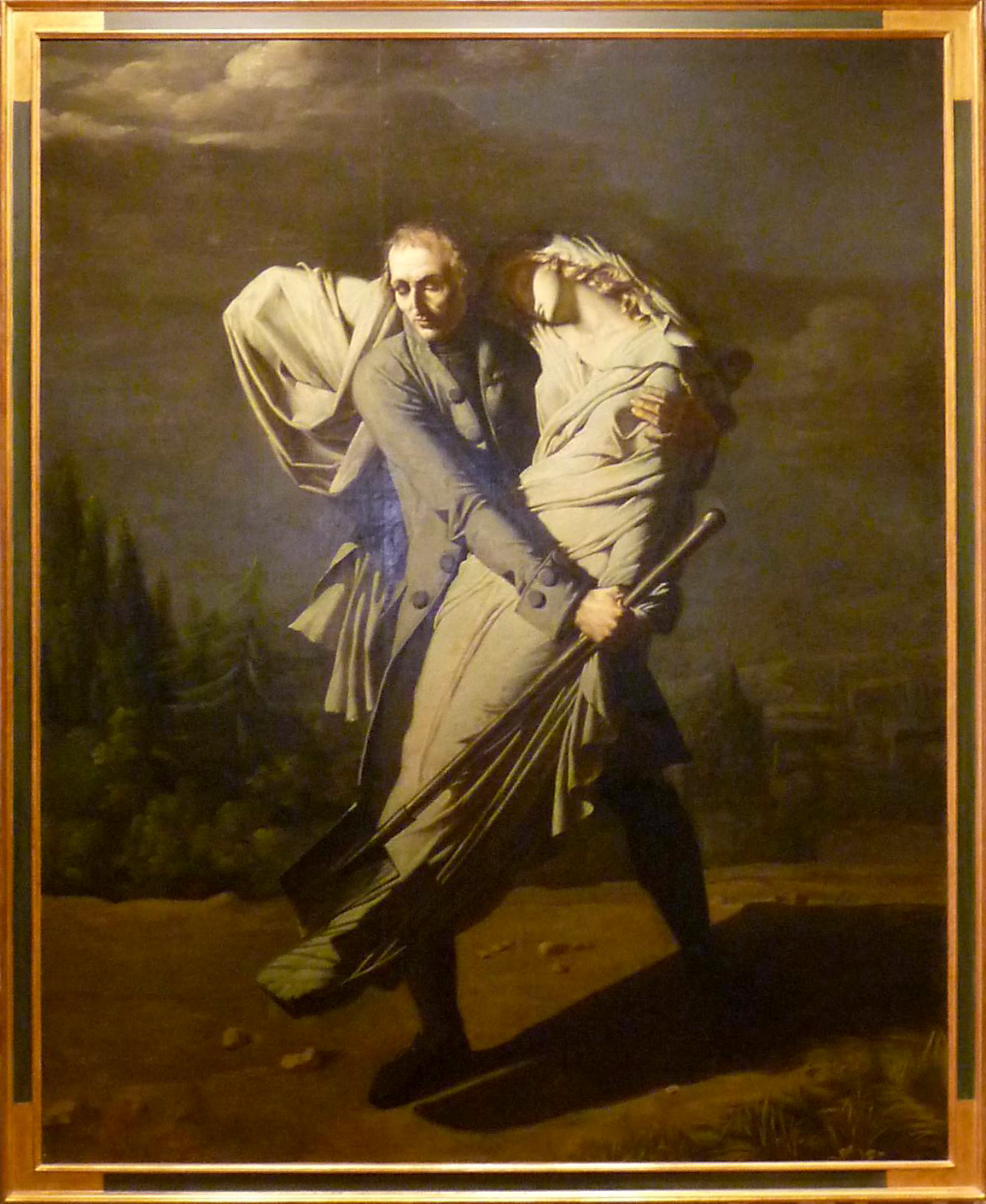
Young and his Daughter by Pierre-Auguste Vafflard

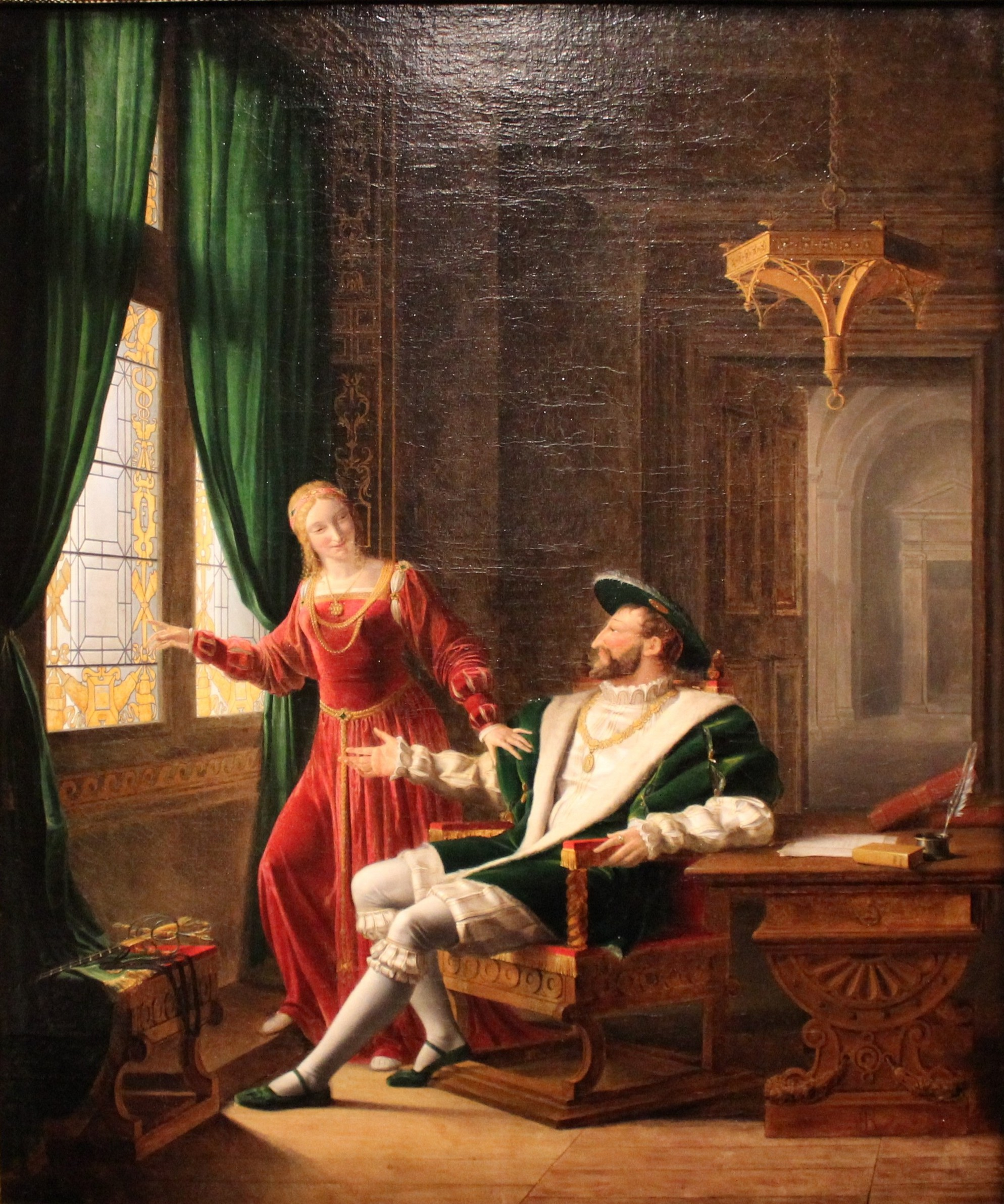
Francis I Shows Marguerite de Navarre, his Sister, the Verses he has Just Written on a Window with his Diamond by Fleury François Richard

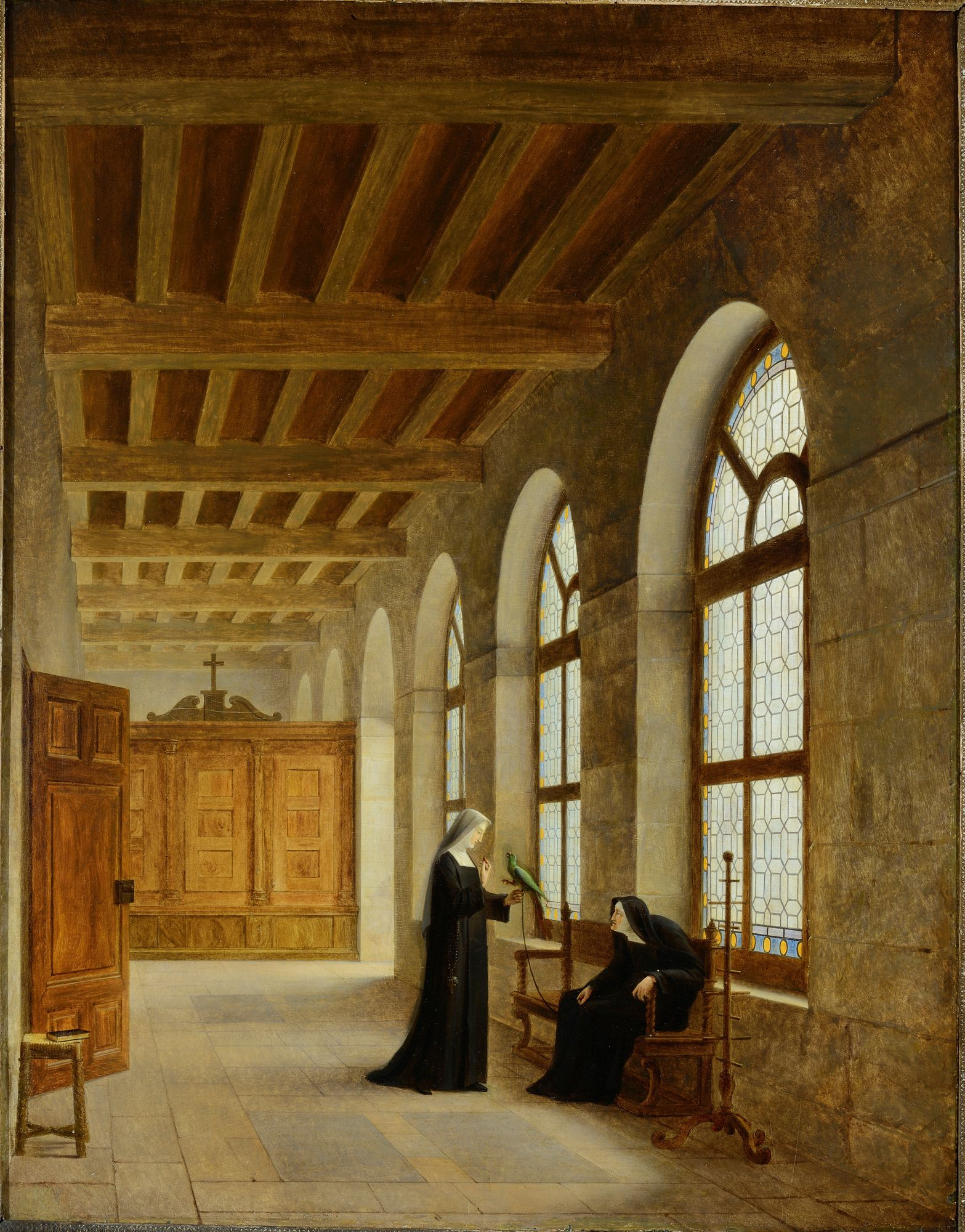
Vert-Vert by Fleury François Richard

Exterior of a Military Hospital, or the French in Italy by Nicolas-Antoine Taunay

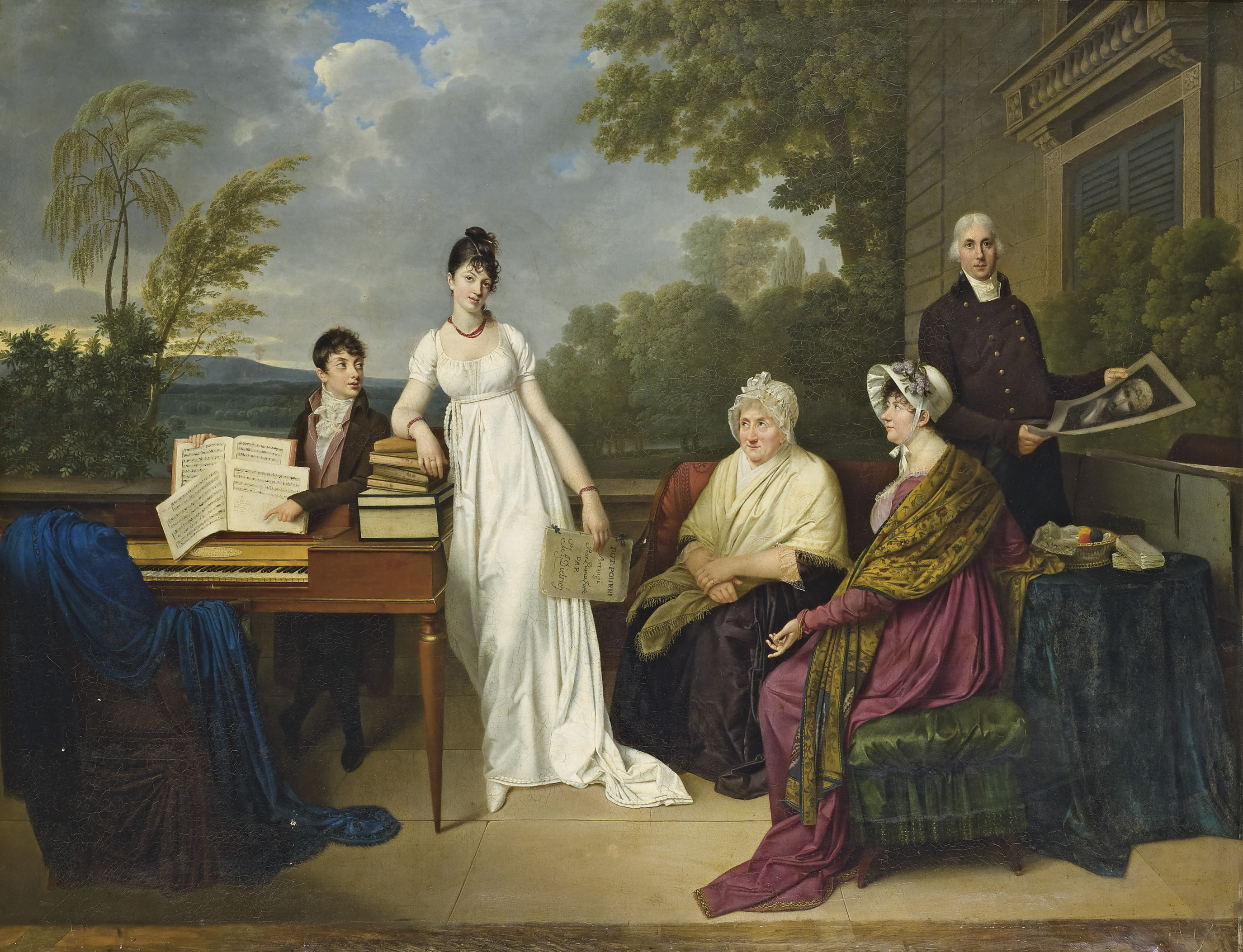
Portrait of the Artist's Family in Front of the Chateau de Juily, Ile-de-France by Adèle Romany

First Snow in Piedmont by Cesar van Loo

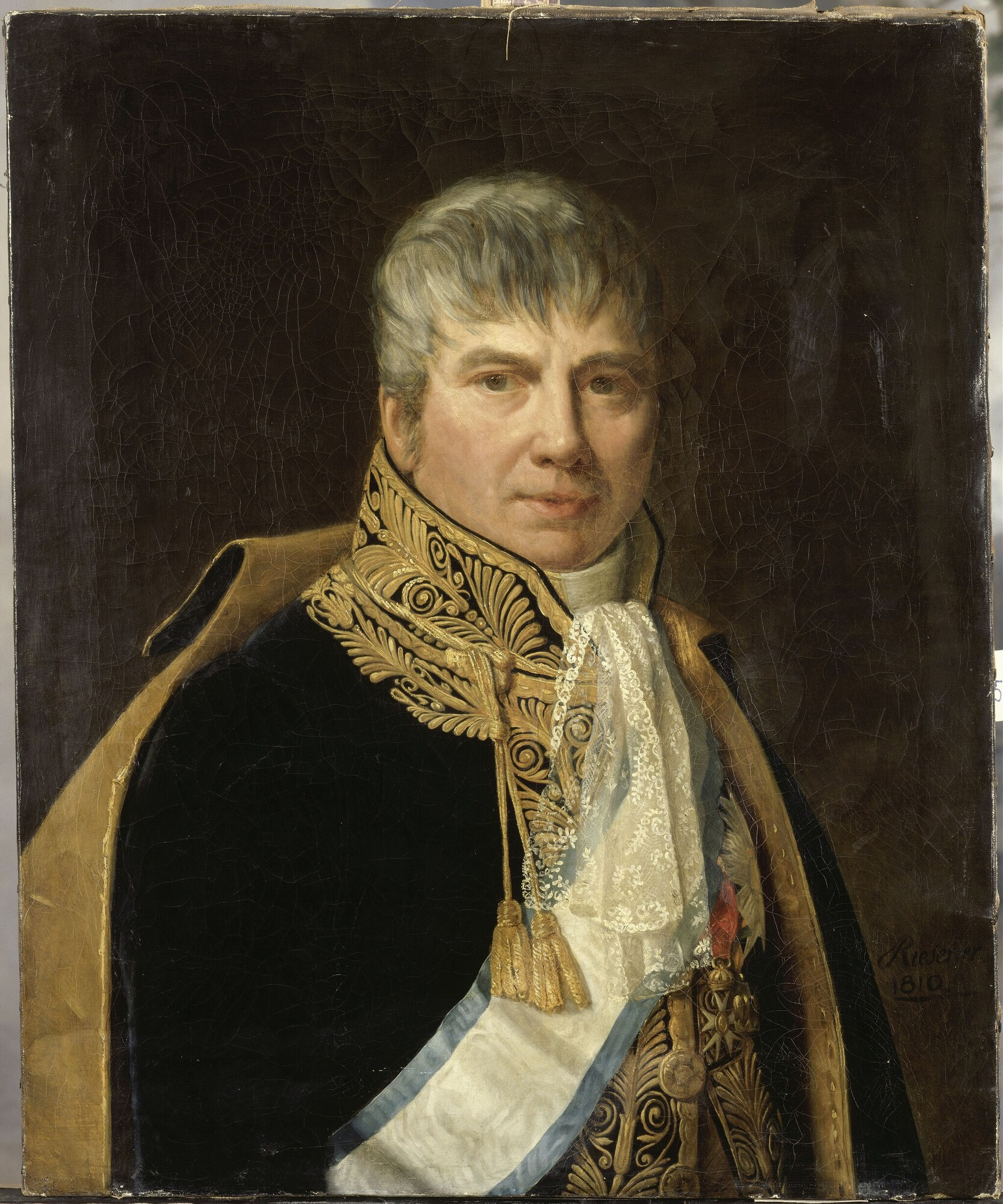
Portrait of General Michel Ordener by Henri-François Riesener

=== Sculptures ===
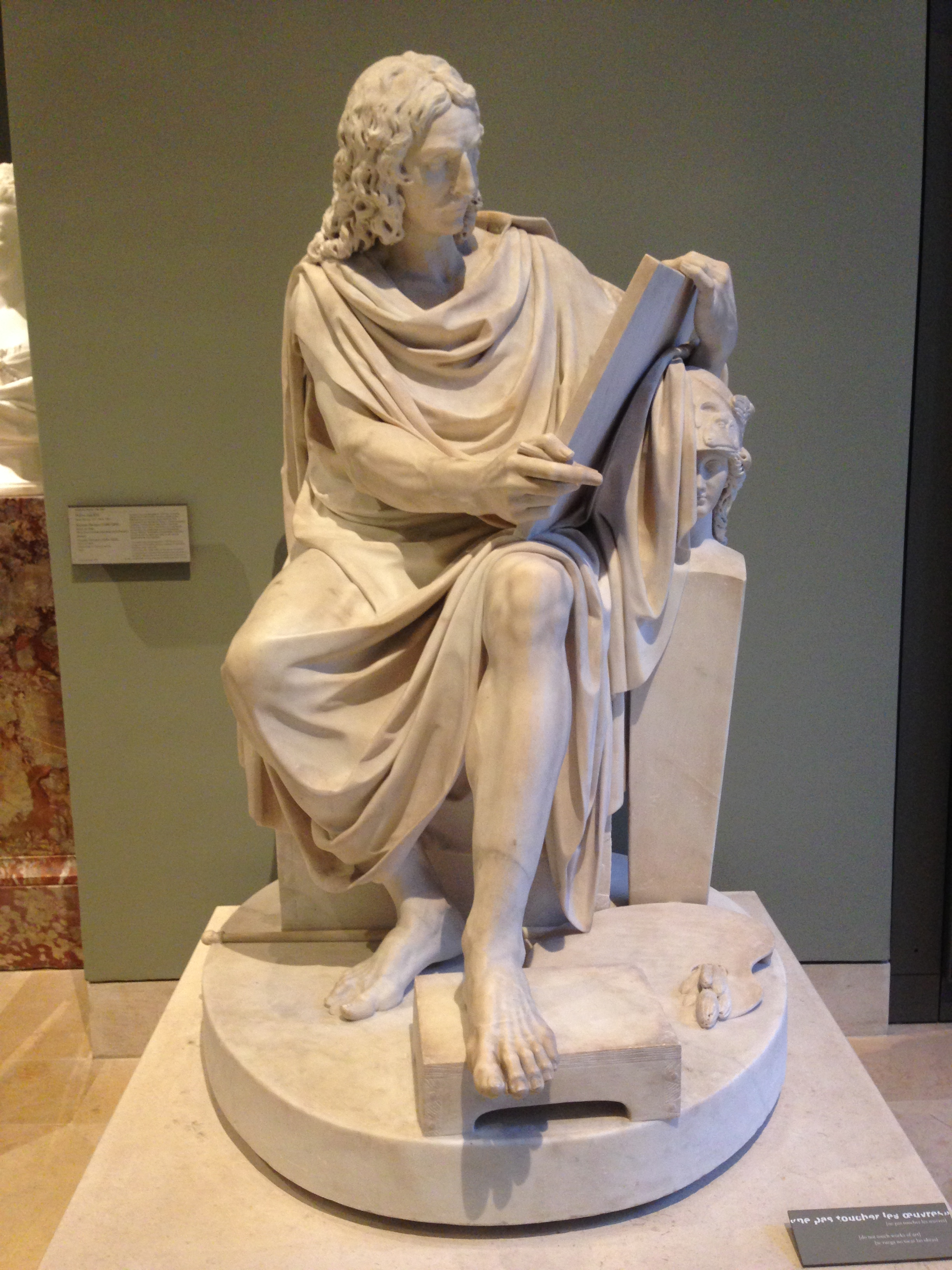
Sculpture of Nicolas Poussin, marble, by Pierre Julien

== See also ==
- Royal Academy Exhibition of 1804 held at Somerset House in London

== Bibliography ==
- Allégret, Marc (June–July 2003). "Lejeune Louis François, baron, 1775–1848, général, peintre et mémorialiste". Revue du Souvenir Napoléonien (in French) (447): 65–66 – via napoleon.org.
- Barker, Emma (9 August 2012). "Napoleonic paintings". OpenLearn. The Open University.
- Bucknell, Clare (2 March 2023). "Don't wait to be asked". London Review of Books. Vol. 45, no. 5.
- Clot, Nathalie (2004). "Du Consulat à vie à l'Empire héréditaire (1802–1804)". napoleon.org (in French). Fondation Napoléon.
- Denton, Margaret (2003). "Marie-Jeanne-Angélique Levol". Dictionnaire des femmes de l'Ancienne France. Société internationale pour l'étude des femmes de l'Ancien Régime.
- Janson, H. W., ed. (1977) [First published Paris: Imprimerie des Sciences et Arts, 1804]. "Explication des ouvrages de peinture, sculpture, architecture et gravure, des artistes vivans, exposés au Musée Napoléon, le 1.er jour complémentaire, an XII de la République française". Catalogues of the Paris Salon 1673 to 1881 (in French). Vol. 1802, 1804. New York: Garland – via Internet Archive.
- Galitz, Kathryn Calley (16 July 2021). "Great Women Artists". Perspectives. Metropolitan Museum of Art.
- Ledoux-Lebard, Guy (July 1970). "Le tableau de Gros : les Pestiférés de Jaffa". Souvenir Napoléonien (in French) (255): 24–25 – via napoleon.org.
- Massonnaud, Dominique, ed. (2005). "Salon de 1804". Le Nu moderne au salon (1799–1853). Archives critiques (in French). Grenoble: UGA Éditions. pp. 35–46. doi:10.4000/books.ugaeditions.8579. ISBN 978-2-84310-067-3.
- "Benoist Marie-Guillemine". culture.gouv.fr (in French). Ministère de la Culture. 1 June 2018.
- "Bataille du Mont Thabor. 16 avril 1799". POP : la plateforme ouverte du patrimoine (in French). Ministère de la Culture. 22 April 2024.
- "Royalists to Romantics: Spotlight on Marie Guilhelmine Benoist". Broad Strokes. National Museum of Women in the Arts. 13 March 2012.
- "John Vanderlyn". Early American Paintings in the Worcester Art Museum. Worcester Art Museum.
