= Portrait of Carle Vernet =

1804 painting by Robert Lefèvre

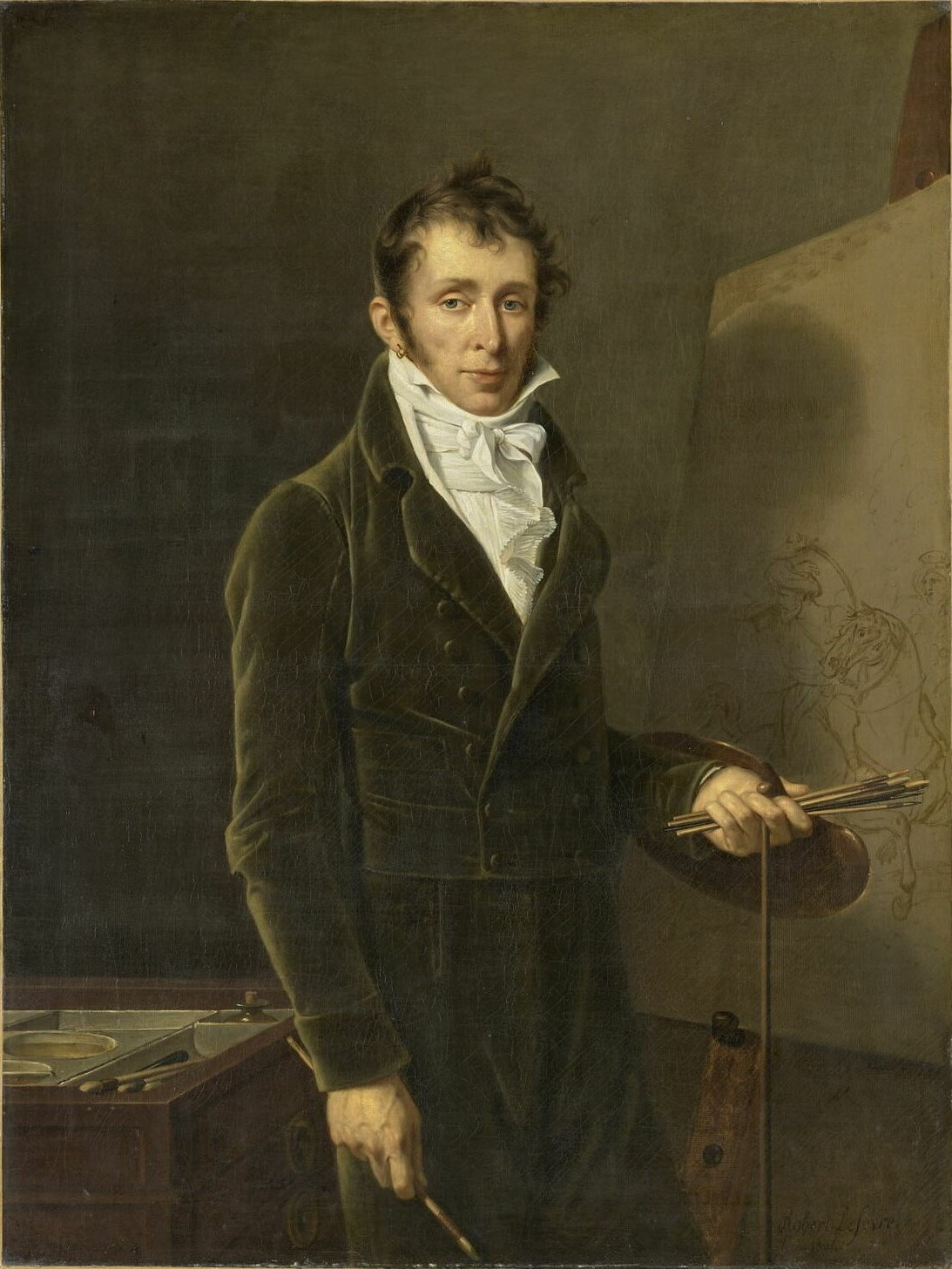
- Artist: Robert Lefèvre
- Year: 1804
- Type: Oil on canvas, portrait painting
- Dimensions: 129.5 cm × 97.5 cm (51.0 in × 38.4 in)
- Location: Louvre, Paris

Portrait of Carle Vernet is an 1804 portrait painting by the French artist Robert Lefèvre depicting his fellow painter Carle Vernet.

Carle Vernet came from a family of artists. He was the son of the famous marine painter Claude-Joseph Vernet. His own son Horace Vernet was a noted painter of the nineteenth century. Lefèvre was a noted portraitist during the Napoleonic and Restoration eras.

The painting was exhibited at the Salon of 1804. It is now in the collection of the Louvre in Paris.

== Bibliography ==
- Bordes, Phillipe. Portraiture in Paris Around 1800: Cooper Penrose by Jacques-Louis David. Timken Museum of Art, 2003.
- Halliday, Anthony. Facing the Public: Portraiture in the Aftermath of the French Revolution. Manchester University Press, 2000.
- Harkett, Daniel & Hornstein, Katie (ed.) Horace Vernet and the Thresholds of Nineteenth-Century Visual Culture. Dartmouth College Press, 2017.
- Palmer, Allison Lee. Historical Dictionary of Neoclassical Art and Architecture. Scarecrow Press, 2011.
