= The Arrival of a Stagecoach in the Courtyard of the Messageries =

Painting by Louis-Léopold Boilly

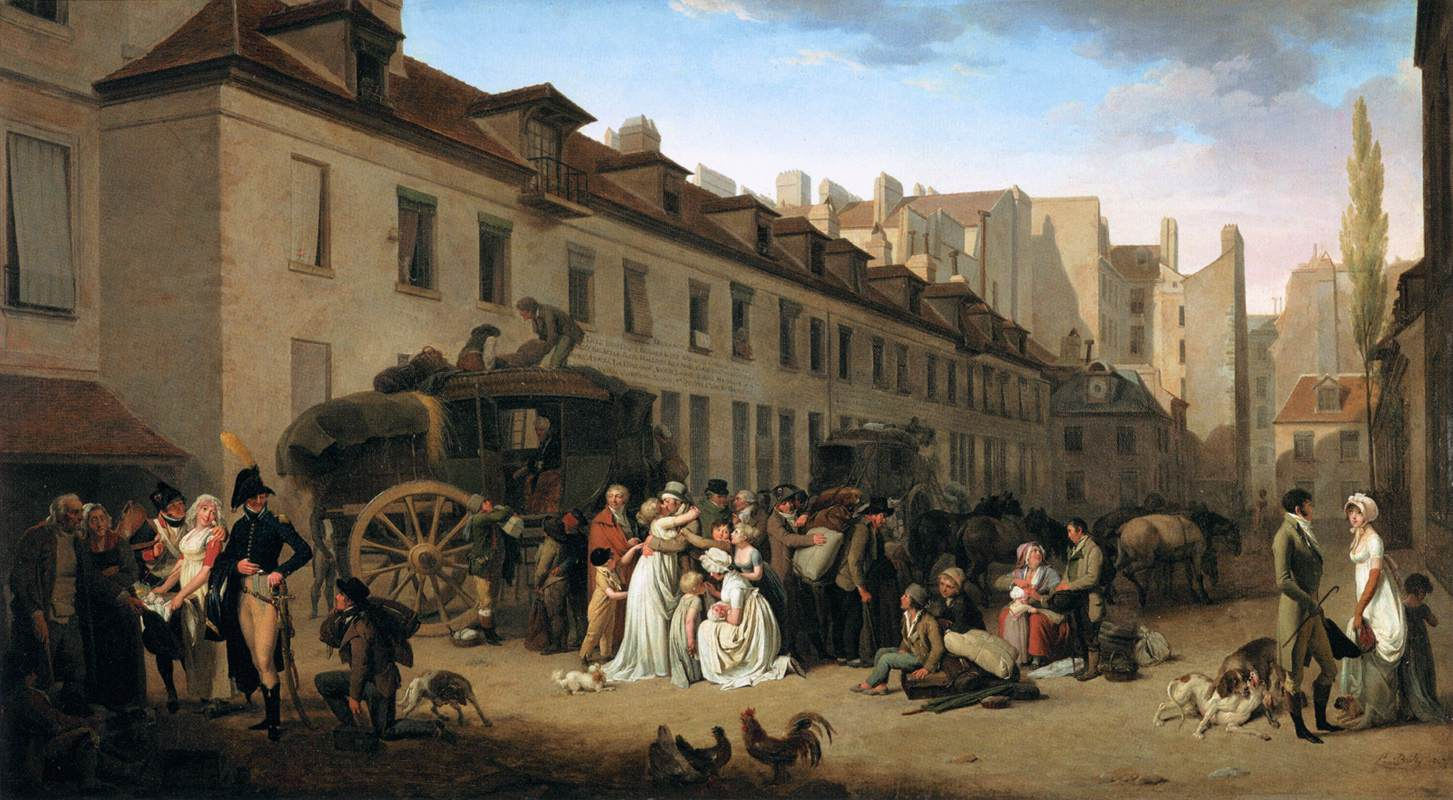
- Artist: Louis-Léopold Boilly
- Year: 1803
- Type: Oil on panel, genre painting
- Dimensions: 62 cm × 108 cm (24 in × 43 in)
- Location: Louvre, Paris

The Arrival of a Stagecoach in the Courtyard of the Messageries (French: L'Arrivée d'une diligence dans la cour des Messageries) is an 1803 oil painting by the French artist Louis-Léopold Boilly. A genre painting is shows the arrival of a stagecoach in the courtyard of the headquarters of the Messageries nationales in the Rue Notre-Dame-des-Victoires in Paris. Boilly enjoyed success with crowd scenes in contemporary familiar settings during the Napoleonic era.

The painting was displayed at the Salon of 1804 at the Louvre in Paris. It was acquired for the collection of the Louvre in 1845.

== Bibliography ==
- Wrightsman, Jayne. The Wrightsman Pictures. Metropolitan Museum of Art, 2005.
- Pomerède, Vincent & Trébosc, Delphine. 1001 Paintings at the Louvre: From Antiquity to the Nineteenth Century. Musée du Louvre Editions, 2005.
