= Aimée Thibault =

French painter (1784–1868)

- Born: January 2, 1784; Bordeaux, France
- Died: February 6, 1868 (aged 84); Paris, France
- Resting place: Montmartre Cemetery
- Education: Étienne-Charles Le Guay, Daniel Saint
- Known for: Portrait miniature

Aimée Thibault (2 January 1784 – 6 February 1868) was a French miniaturist who painted miniature portraits of people including Napoleon II and Ferdinand VII.

== Early life ==
Thibault was born on 2 January 1784 in Bordeaux, France, and baptized on 4 January. She was educated in painting by Étienne-Charles Le Guay and Daniel Saint; Saint was influenced by the works of Jean-Baptiste Isabey, and this influence is reflected in Thibault's portraits.

== Artistic career ==
Thibault made her debut at the Salon art exhibition in Paris in 1804 and continued to exhibit her art there until 1810. In 1817 she painted miniatures of King Ferdinand VII of Spain and his wife Maria Isabel of Braganza, described by the author Manuel Ossorio y Bernard as "perfect in appearance and cleanliness of work". She traveled to New York City for a short time in 1836.

Thibault died on 6 February 1868 at her house in Paris; she was buried on 7 February at Montmartre Cemetery.

== Gallery ==
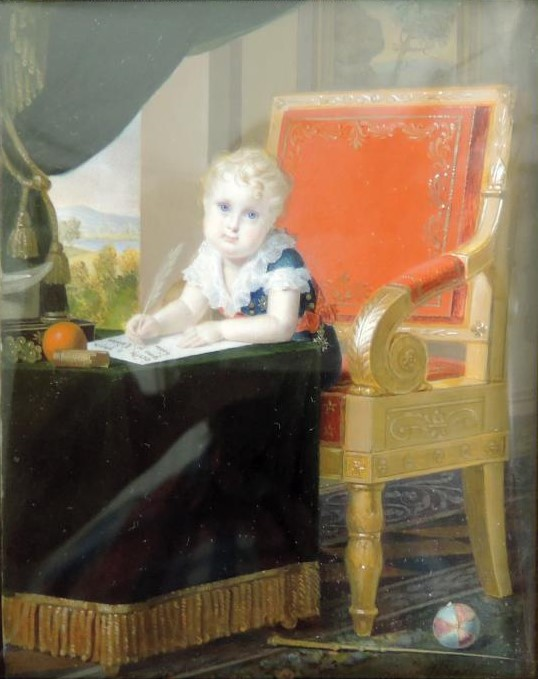
The King of Rome, as a child writing to his father Napoleon

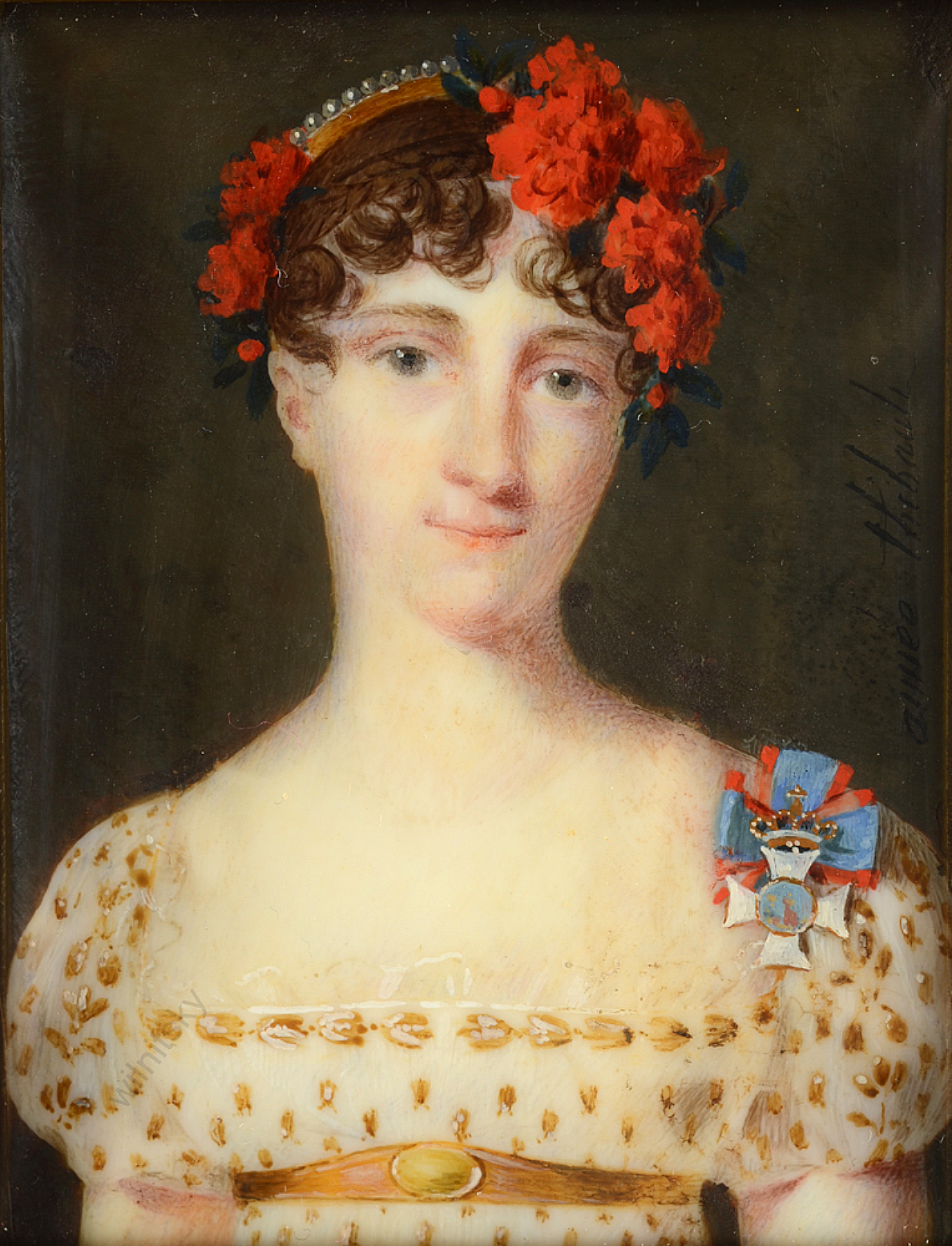
Augusta of Bavaria, wife of Eugene de Beauharnais

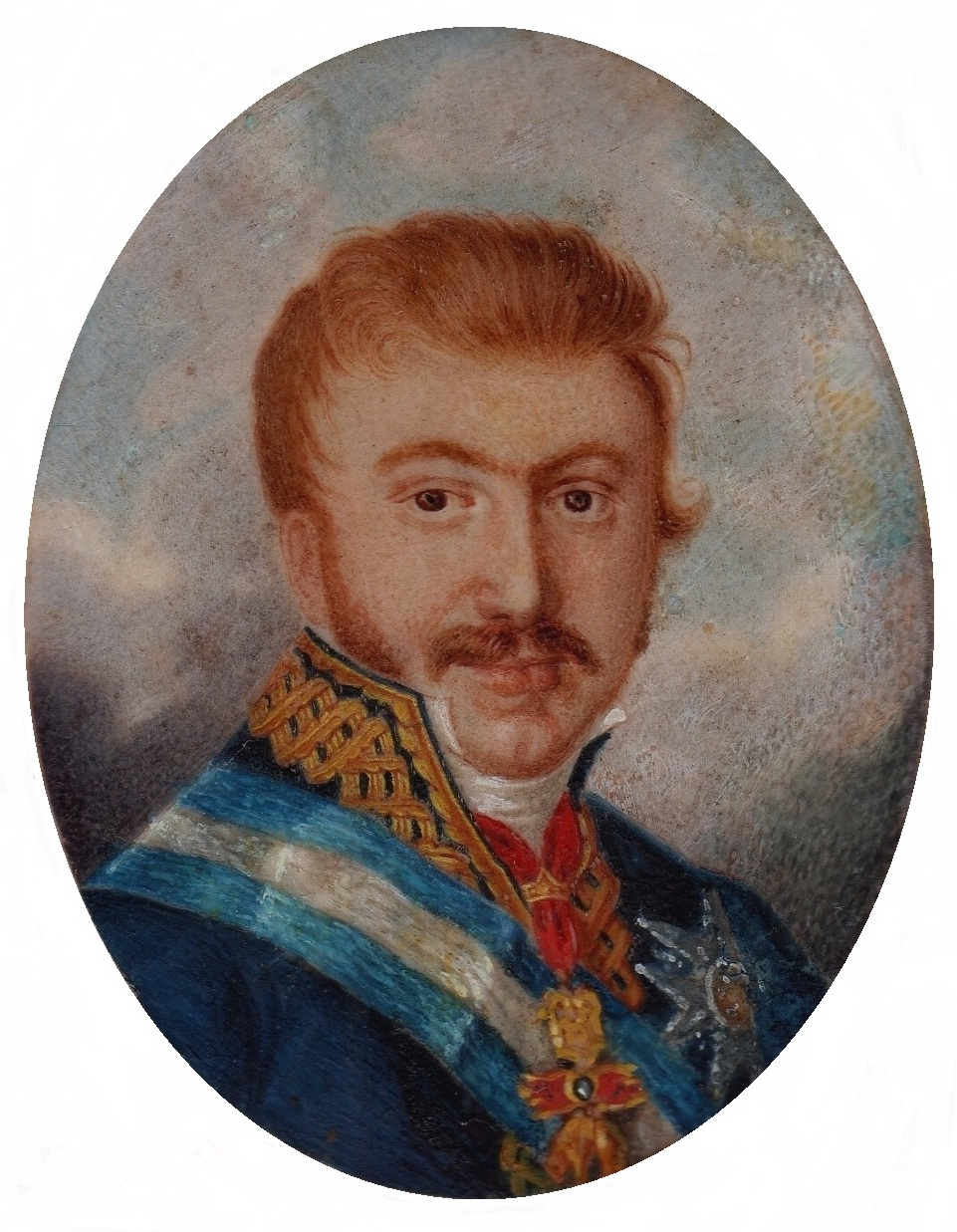
The Infante Carlos María Isidro de Borbon

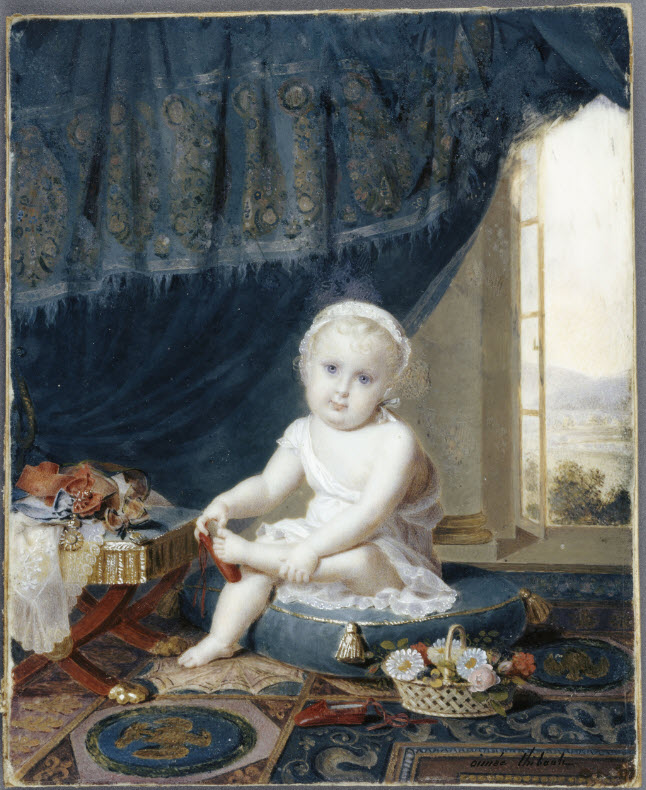
The king of Rome cobbing a shoe

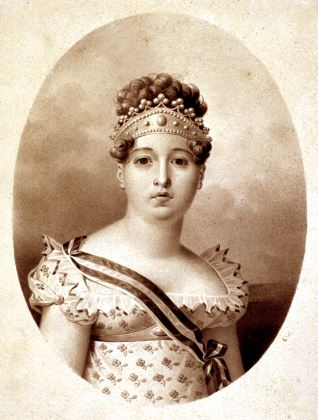
Portrait of Maria Isabel of Braganza

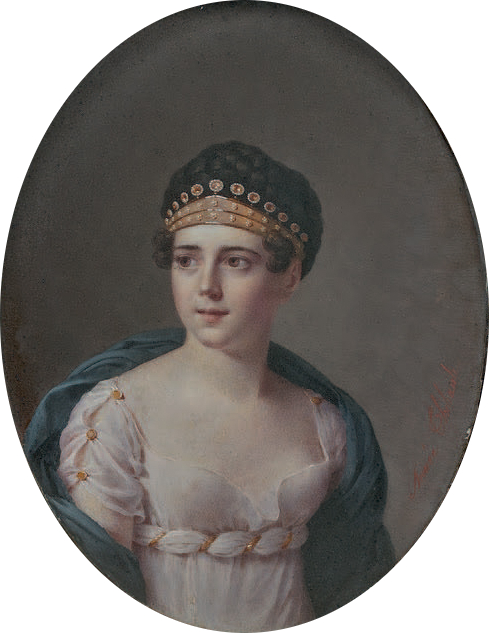
Portrait of Madame Giacomell
