= Lahure =

Lahure may refer to:

== People with the surname ==
- Johny Lahure (1942-2003), a Luxembourgian politician
- Louis Joseph Lahure (1767-1853), a Dutch-French general

== Film ==
- Lahure (film), a 1989 Nepali film
