= Capture of the Dutch fleet at Den Helder =

1795 battle of the War of the First Coalition

Coordinates: 52.9583°N 4.7589°E

- Part of the Low Countries theatre of the War of the First Coalition
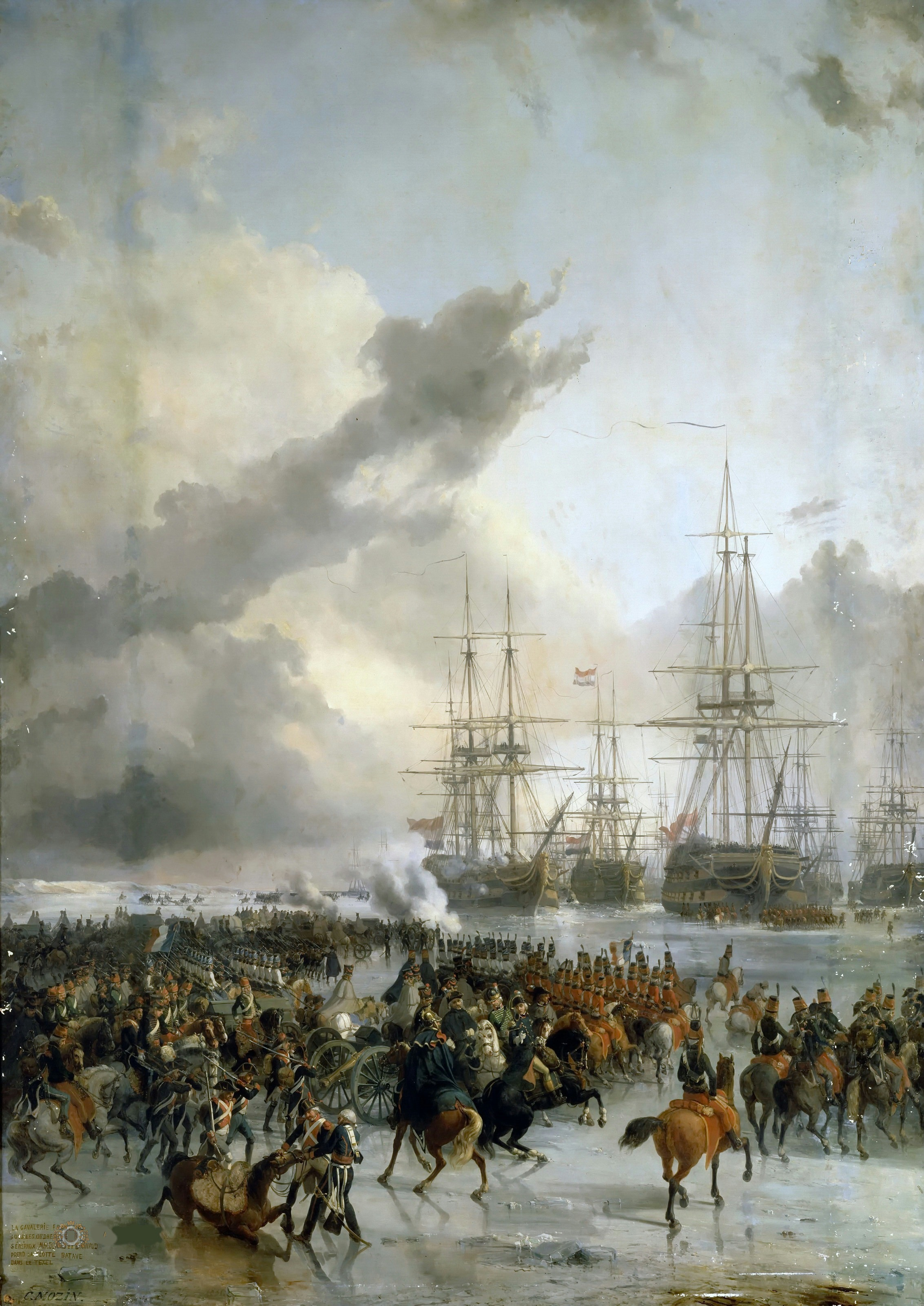
- The prize of the Dutch fleet, stopped by ice in the Texel sea in the winter of 1795; Charles Mozin, 1836
Date	23 January 1795
Location	Near Den Helder, Dutch Republic
Result	French victory

Belligerents
France	Dutch Republic

Commanders and leaders
Jan Willem de Winter; Louis Lahure	Hermanus Reintjes

Strength
1 hussar regiment 1 infantry battalion	5 ships of the line 3 frigates 6 corvettes 4 cutters

Casualties and losses
None	5 ships of the line captured 3 frigates captured 6 corvettes captured 4 cutters captured
- Location within Europe

The capture of the Dutch fleet at Den Helder on the night of 23 January 1795 presents a rare occurrence of an interaction between warships and cavalry, in which a French Revolutionary Hussar regiment came close to a Dutch fleet frozen at anchor in the Nieuwediep, just east of the town of Den Helder. After some of the Hussars had approached across the frozen Nieuwediep, (Note: De Jonge quoting correspondence with Lahure, notes that the French troops moved from Haarlem to Den Helder overland, which was more convenient, as there is no need to make a long detour across the Zuiderzee, whether there was ice on it or not; de Jonge, p. 187, note 1. Besides, on the basis of the testimony of eye witnesses he says that the ice on the Zuiderzee would not have been strong enough to carry a squadron of cavalry; de Jonge, p. 184.) the French cavalry negotiated that all 14 Dutch warships would remain at anchor. A capture of ships by horsemen is an extremely rare feat in military history.

The French units were the 8th Hussar Regiment and the Voltigeur company of the 15th Line Infantry Regiment of the French Revolutionary Army. Jean-Charles Pichegru was the leader of the French army that invaded the Dutch Republic. The Dutch fleet was commanded by Captain Hermanus Reintjes. The action happened during the War of the First Coalition, which was part of the French Revolutionary Wars.

== Background ==
Den Helder is located at the tip of the North Holland peninsula, south of the island of Texel, by an inlet to what was then the shallow Zuiderzee bay (Southern Sea). The Zuiderzee has been closed off and partly drained in the 20th century, and what is left of it now forms the freshwater IJsselmeer.

In the fall of 1794, during the War of the First Coalition of the French Revolutionary Wars, general Jean-Charles Pichegru commanded the French forces during the conquest of the Dutch Republic. The French entered Amsterdam on 19 January 1795 to stay there over winter. That same day, the Dutch proclaimed the Batavian Republic, effectively ending the war with France and allying itself with France instead. The French were no longer enemies of the Dutch. However, among the Dutch Navy and the army there were still some who remained loyal to the Stadtholder, and there were fears that Navy ships from Den Helder might sail for England to rejoin William V, Prince of Orange. The new Batavian interim Government issued orders to all its fleets at Vlissingen, Hellevoetsluis and at Den Helder, not to fight against the French if they appeared, and to keep the ships at anchor to make sure they could be ready to defend the new Republic against the British.

The winter of 1794–1795 was exceptionally cold, causing the Zuiderzee to freeze. Pichegru ordered General of Brigade Jan Willem de Winter to lead a squadron of the 8th Hussar Regiment to Den Helder. De Winter had been serving with the French since 1787, and would later command the Dutch fleet in the disastrous Battle of Camperdown.

== Capture ==
General de Winter arrived at Den Helder with his troops during the night of 23 January 1795. (Note: De Jonge states that general de Winter arrived in Den Helder only three days later; p. 191.) The Dutch fleet was there as expected, trapped by ice. Each hussar carried an infantryman of the 15th Line Infantry Regiment on his horse. After a careful approach (the hussars had covered the horses' hooves with fabric), Lieutenant-colonel Louis Lahure went across the ice of the Nieuwediep (river) with a few of his men. The French were allowed to board the Dutch ships for negotiations. The French received the assurance from the Dutch captain that the vessels and their crews would remain at anchor until the political situation in the Dutch Republic would have become clear; neither side suffered any casualties.

== Outcome ==
With the 14 warships, 850 guns, and several merchant ships now still in Batavian possession, the French submission of the Netherlands was brought to an end. It is one of the few instances in recorded military history wherein cavalry came close to a fleet; José Antonio Páez's cavalry attack across the Apure River in 1818 is another example of a cavalry crossing a river in Venezuela to then attack a Spanish army.

=== Overview of ships ===
The status of the ships was clarified in May 1795 under the Treaty of The Hague, when the Batavian Republic officially became a French ally, and its ships would serve a common cause.

Ships of the line

- Admiraal de Ruijter (68) – built 1776–1778; captured by the British in the 1799 Vlieter incident
- Gelderland (68) – built 1781; captured by the British in the 1799 Vlieter incident
- Frederik Willem – built 1788; captured by the British in 1797
- Princes Louisa – captured by the British in 1799
- Admiraal Piet Heyn – built 1774; sold to be broken up in 1799

Frigates

- Monnikendam – built in 1782; captured by the British 1797
- Argo – launched in 1791; captured by the British in 1796
- Alliantie – launched in 1788; captured by the British in 1795

Hulks

- Admiraal-Generaal – built in 1763–1764; sold 1795
- Amsterdam – built in 1763; sold 1795

Corvettes

- Enkhuizen – built in 1778–1780; broken up 1800
- Venus – built in 1768; captured by the British 1796
- Echo – built in 1789; wrecked and wreck sold 1796
- Dolphijn – completed in 1780; burnt or captured by British 1799
- Pallas – built in 1781; captured by the British 1797
- Zeepaard – launched in 1782; wrecked or broken up 1805

Cutters

- Lynx – built in 1784; prize to HMS Circe October 1799
- Snelheid – built in 1782; captured by the British 1795
- Valk – built in 1770; captured 1799
- Twee – 8 guns

=== Subsequent events ===
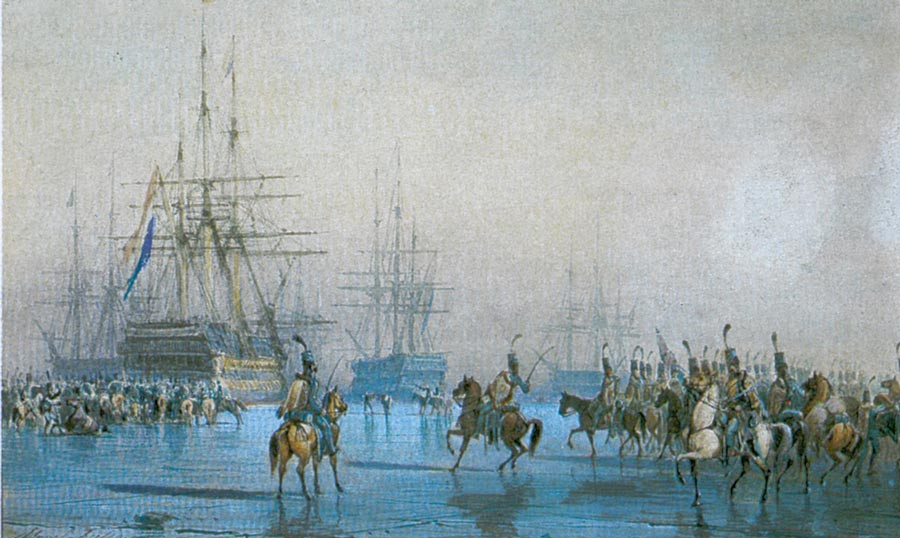
Capture of the Dutch fleet by the French cavalry

In February 1795, a massive mutiny broke out amongst Dutch sailors, who hadn't been paid for nearly a year and who thought that, now the old Republic had ceased to exist, they were no longer required to adhere to naval discipline. This led to a mass of Dutch sailors leaving the ships, with only skeleton crews remaining in place.

In the Vlieter incident on 30 August 1799, a Batavian Navy fleet under the command of Samuel Story of which the majority consisted of Orangists, people who had remained loyal to William V, Prince of Orange, surrendered to the Royal Navy. The incident occurred during the Anglo-Russian invasion of Holland. It took place in a tidal trench in the channel between Texel and the mainland that was known as De Vlieter, near Wieringen. Two of the vessels that were handed to the British were Admiral de Ruyter and Gelderland.

== Factual authenticity ==
The traditional narrative of French cavalry storming and capturing the ships at Den Helder is primarily based on French sources, which all copy the story from each other, the main source for the story being the work of Antoine-Henri Jomini's work Histoire critique et militaire des campagnes de la Revolution. It is, however, unclear what source Jomini himself used. Most likely it was the story that was later published by Colonel Lahure himself. Apart from Jomini's assertions, no primary sources from French side exist about the incident. Dutch historian Johannes Cornelis de Jonge states that the Dutch fleet had already received orders on 21 January to offer no resistance and he cites official correspondence in the National Archives as well as deposited statements by Dutch naval officers who were eyewitnesses. Instead, de Jonge states that a few French hussars merely crossed the ice to negotiate a handover by the Dutch officers.

Reintjes stayed aboard the Admiraal Piet Heyn to await the arrival of De Winter, who was scheduled to arrive in three days. De Winter subsequently had the officers and crews of the ships pledge an oath that they would peacefully surrender — similar to the oath administered at the surrender of the fleet at Hellevoetsluis several days earlier. De Jonge states that the misconception stems from an 1819 publication by Swiss general Antoine-Henri Jomini, whose account was subsequently cited by French historians.
