= Louis Lahure =

Louis Joseph Lahure
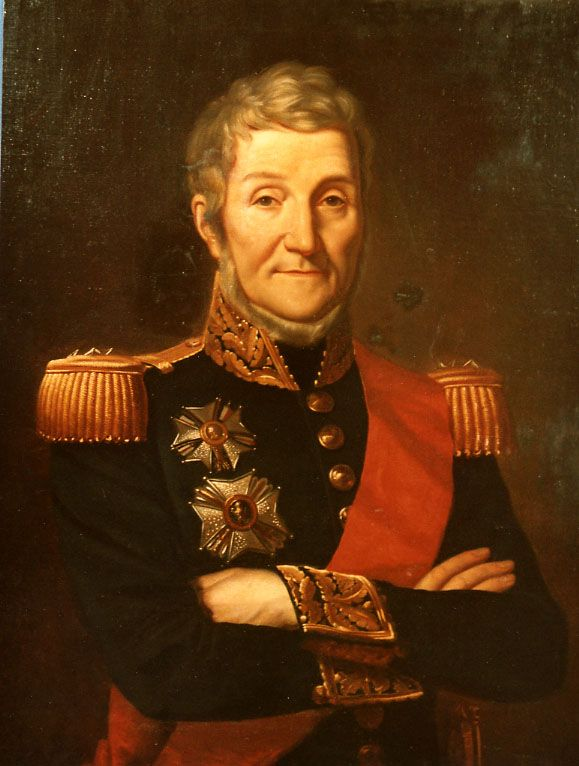
- Born: November 29, 1767; Mons, Austrian Netherlands
- Died: October 24, 1853 (aged 85); Wavrechain-sous-Faulx, France
- Military career
- Allegiance: Brabant Revolution; France
- Branch: French Army
- Service years: 1787–1853
- Rank: Lieutenant general
- Wars: French Revolutionary Wars; Napoleonic Wars
- Awards: Légion d'Honneur; Order of Leopold

Louis Joseph Lahure (November 29, 1767 – October 24, 1853) was a foreign-born general in the service of the French First Republic and First French Empire.

== Biography ==
=== Early life ===
Louis Joseph Lahure was born on November 29, 1767, in Mons in the Austrian Netherlands. He was the son of Nicolas Lahure and Marie-Thérèse du Buisson. He had a brother, Germain Lahure. He studied at the Old University of Leuven.

=== Career ===
Lahure served in the Brabant Revolution in 1787. He moved to Lille in France in 1790. He served in the Army of the North under General Nicolas Luckner. He served in the Army of Sambre-et-Meuse.

He became a general. Occupying Holland in January 1795, the French continental army learned that the Dutch navy had been frozen into the ice near Texel Island. Lahure and 128 men simply rode up to it and demanded surrender. No shots were fired and the Dutch fleet was captured.

Lahure became a naturalised French citizen. He was made a Grand Officier of the Legion of Honour and the Order of Leopold. He was also made a Knight of the Order of Saint Louis.

== Personal life ==
Lahure married Anne de Warenghien de Flory in 1800. They had seven children and resided at the Château de Wavrechain-sous-Faulx in northern France.

He died on October 24, 1853.

== Legacy ==
His name is inscribed on the Arc de Triomphe in Paris. In 1895, Lahure's grandson published his memoirs.
