= French Revolutionary Wars =

1792–1802 wars

- Part of the French Revolution and Coalition Wars
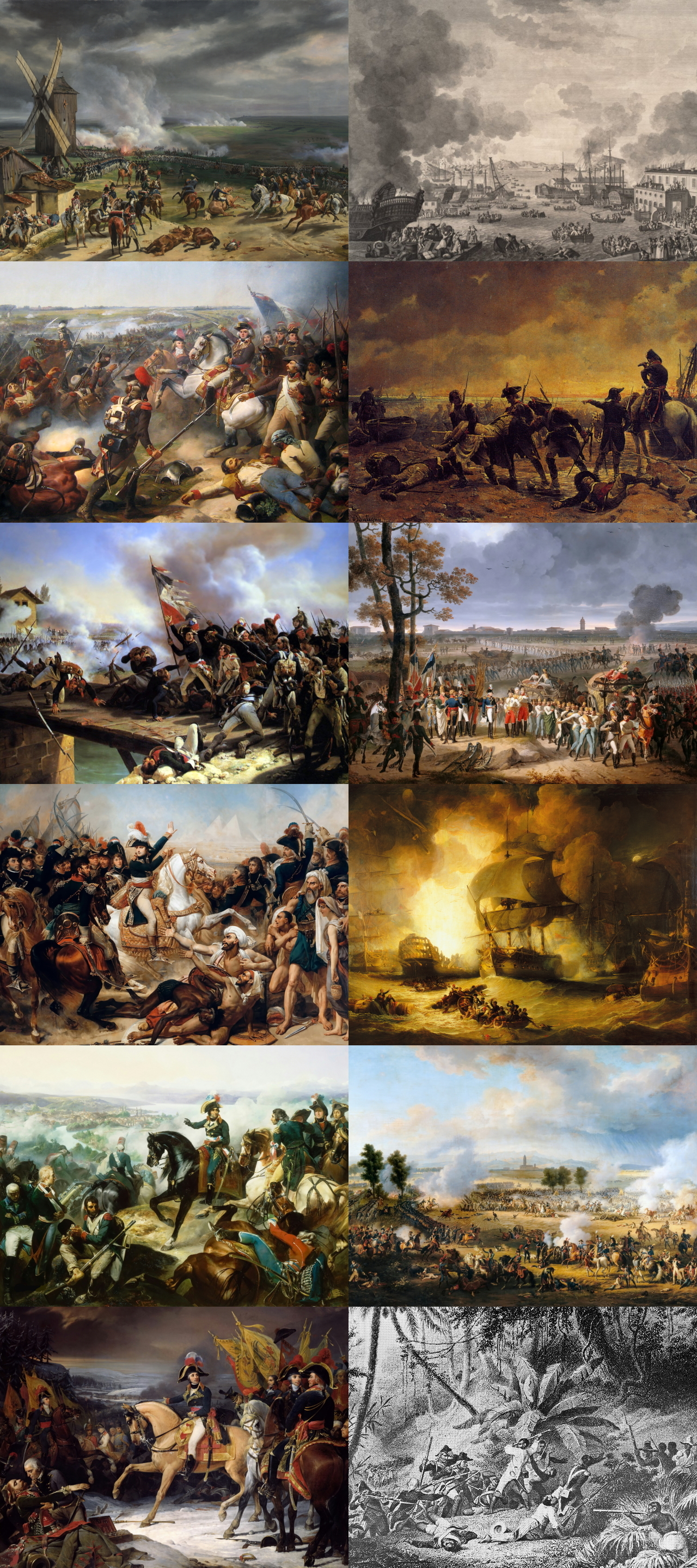
- French Revolutionary Wars Click an image to load the appropriate article. Left to right, top to bottom: Battles of Valmy, Toulon, Fleurus, Quiberon, Arcole, Mantua, the Pyramids, the Nile, Zurich, Marengo, Hohenlinden, Ravine-à-Couleuvres
Date	20 April 1792 – 27 March 1802 (9 years, 11 months and 1 week)
Location	Europe, Egypt, Middle East, Atlantic Ocean, Caribbean, Indian Ocean, Indian subcontinent
Result	First Coalition: French victory: Peace of Basel; Treaty of Campo Formio; Second Coalition: French victory: Treaty of Lunéville; Treaty of Amiens; Eventual beginning of the Haitian Revolution
Territorial changes	Fall of the Kingdom of France and establishment of the French Republic; France annexes Piedmont and all the lands west of the Rhine; Establishment of the pro-French Batavian, Helvetic, Italian, and Ligurian Republics; Louisiana to France; Fall of Saint-Domingue to the Haitian Revolution; Other territorial changes

Belligerents
Catholic and Royal Armies; (Kingdom of France) Émigré armies; Holy Roman Empire (Note: The Austrian Netherlands and the Duchy of Milan were under direct Austrian rule. Many other Italian states, as well as other Habsburg ruled states such as the Grand Duchy of Tuscany, had close ties with the Habsburgs.); Austria (until 1801); Prussia (1792–95) (Note: Neutral following the Treaty of Basel in 1795.); Great Britain (1793–1801); Anglo-Corsican Kingdom (until 1796); East India Company; United Kingdom (from 1801) (Note: The Kingdom of Great Britain united with Ireland in 1801 to become the United Kingdom of Great Britain and Ireland.); Spain (1793–1795); Dutch Republic (1793–1795); Sardinia; Old Swiss Confederacy (1798) (Note: See French invasion of Switzerland and Stecklikrieg); Naples; (Sovereign Military Order of Malta) Order of Saint John (1798); Malta (1798–1800); Ottoman Empire; Kingdom of Portugal; Russia (1799); Other Italian states (Note: Virtually all of the Italian states, including the neutral Papal States and the Republic of Venice, were conquered following Napoleon's invasion in 1796 and became French satellite states.); Southern Netherlands peasants; (Peasants' War); (Haiti) Saint-Domingue rebels; (Haitian Revolution) (1791–94); United States; (Quasi-War) (1798–1800)	Kingdom of France (until 1792) (Note: War against Austria was actually announced in the National Assembly by then King Louis XVI of the French on 20 April 1792 while the kingdom still existed in name. (Constitutional) monarchy was suspended on 10 August following the assault on the Tuileries, and abolished 21 September 1792.); French Republic (from 1792): Batavian Republic (1795–1802); Irish Republic (Note: Started the Irish Rebellion of 1798 against British rule.); Polish Legions (Note: Arrived in France following the abolition of the Polish–Lithuanian Commonwealth after the Third Partition in 1795.); Helvetic Republic (1798, 1802); (France) Revolutionary Grenada (Fédon's rebellion) (1795–1796) Spain (1796–1802) (Note: Re-entered the war as an ally of France after signing the Second Treaty of San Ildefonso.); Mysore (until 1799); Durrani Empire (until 1799); Denmark-Norway (Battle of Copenhagen and the English Wars)

Commanders and leaders
(Kingdom of France) Prince Louis Joseph (Kingdom of France) Jacques Cathelineau † (Kingdom of France) Henri de la Rochejaquelein † (Kingdom of France) Georges Cadoudal (executed) (Kingdom of France) Jean Chouan † (Habsburg monarchy) Francis II (Habsburg monarchy) Archduke Charles (Habsburg monarchy) József Alvinczi (Habsburg monarchy) Michael von Melas (Habsburg monarchy) François Sébastien de Croix # (Habsburg monarchy) Prince Josias (Habsburg monarchy) Dagobert Sigmund von Wurmser # (Kingdom of Prussia) Frederick William II # (Kingdom of Prussia) Charles William Ferdinand (Kingdom of Prussia) Prince of Hohenlohe (United Kingdom of Great Britain and Ireland) William Pitt (until 1801) (United Kingdom of Great Britain and Ireland) Henry Addington (from 1801) (United Kingdom of Great Britain and Ireland) Horatio Nelson (United Kingdom of Great Britain and Ireland) Prince Frederick (United Kingdom of Great Britain and Ireland) Ralph Abercromby (DOW) (United Kingdom of Great Britain and Ireland) Sidney Smith (Spain) Charles IV (until 1795) (Spain) Antonio Ricardos # (Spain) Luis Firmín † (Dutch Republic) William V (Dutch Republic) Laurens Pieter van de Spiegel # (Dutch Republic) William, Hereditary Prince of Orange (Kingdom of Sardinia) Victor Amadeus III # (Kingdom of Sardinia) Michael Colli (Kingdom of Naples) Ferdinand IV (Ottoman Empire) Selim III (Ottoman Empire) Jazzar Pasha (Ottoman Empire) Murad Bey # (Kingdom of Portugal) Maria I (Kingdom of Portugal) Prince Regent John (Kingdom of Portugal) Miguel Pereira Forjaz (Russian Empire) Paul I X (Russian Empire) Alexander Suvorov # (Russian Empire) Alexander Korsakov (Russian Empire) Fyodor Ushakov Pieter Corbeels (executed) (Haiti) Toussaint Louverture (United States) John Adams	Louis XVI (executed) (until 1792) (French First Republic) Jacques Pierre Brissot (executed) (until 1793) (French First Republic) Maximilien Robespierre (executed) (1793–1794) (French First Republic) Louis Philippe (French First Republic) Paul Barras (1795–1799) (French First Republic) Napoleon Bonaparte (from 1799) (French First Republic) Robert Lindet (French First Republic) Jean-Charles Pichegru (French First Republic) Jean-Baptiste Jourdan (French First Republic) Lazare Hoche # (French First Republic) André Masséna (French First Republic) Jean Lannes (French First Republic) Charles François Dumouriez (French First Republic) Jean Victor Moreau (French First Republic) François Kellermann (French First Republic) Louis Desaix † (French First Republic) Jean Humbert (Spain) Charles IV (from 1796) (Spain) Ignacio de Álava (Batavian Republic) Herman Willem Daendels; Wolfe Tone †; Jan Henryk Dąbrowski; Tipu Sultan †; Mir Sadiq (executed); Purnaiah; Zaman Shah Durrani

Strength
(Kingdom of Great Britain) 500,000	(French First Republic) French; 2,080,000 soldiers mobilized in total (1792–1800); Peak, 1794: 1,169,000

Casualties and losses
Austrians (1792–97); 94,700 killed in action 100,000 wounded 220,000 captured Italian campaign of 1796–97; 27,000 allied soldiers killed Unknown wounded 160,000 captured 1,600 guns Ottomans (1798–1801); 65,000 killed, wounded, or captured (not counting disease) (Kingdom of Great Britain) 3,200 killed in action (navy)	(Constitutional Cabinet of Louis XVI) French; War of the First Coalition: 100,000 killed in action ~200,000 noncombat deaths 150,000 captured War of the Second Coalition: 75,000 killed in action ~150,000 noncombat deaths 140,000 captured Total: ~525,000 military deaths ~290,000 captured (Constitutional Cabinet of Louis XVI) 10,000 killed in action (navy)

The French Revolutionary Wars (French: Guerres de la Révolution française) were a series of sweeping military conflicts resulting from the French Revolution that lasted from 1792 until 1802. They pitted France against Great Britain, Austria, Prussia, Russia, and several other countries. The wars are divided into two periods: the War of the First Coalition (1792–1797) and the War of the Second Coalition (1798–1802). Initially confined to Europe, the fighting gradually assumed a global dimension. After a decade of constant warfare and aggressive diplomacy, France had conquered territories in the Italian peninsula, the Low Countries, and the Rhineland with its very large and powerful military which had been totally mobilized for war against most of Europe with mass conscription of the vast French population. French success in these conflicts ensured military occupation and the spread of revolutionary principles over much of Europe.

As early as 1791, the other monarchies of Europe looked with outrage at the revolution and its upheavals; and they considered whether they should intervene, either in support of King Louis XVI to prevent the spread of revolution, or to take advantage of the chaos in France. Austria stationed significant troops on its French border and together with Prussia issued the Declaration of Pillnitz, which threatened severe consequences should anything happen to King Louis XVI and Queen Marie Antoinette. After Austria refused to recall its troops from the French border and to back down on the perceived threat of using force, France declared war on Austria and Prussia in the spring of 1792; both countries responded with a coordinated invasion that was turned back at the Battle of Valmy in September. This victory emboldened the National Convention to abolish the monarchy. A series of victories by the French Revolutionary Army abruptly ended with defeat at Neerwinden in the spring of 1793. The French suffered additional defeats in the remainder of the year, and these difficult times allowed the Jacobins to rise to power and impose the Reign of Terror to unify the nation.

In 1794 the situation improved dramatically for the French as huge victories at Fleurus against the Austrians and Dutch and against the Spanish at the Battle of the Black Mountain signalled the start of a new stage in the wars. By 1795, the French had captured the Austrian Netherlands and the Dutch Republic. The French also put Spain and Prussia out of the war with the Peace of Basel. A hitherto unknown general named Napoleon Bonaparte began his first campaign in Italy in April 1796. In less than a year, French armies under Napoleon destroyed the Habsburg forces and evicted them from the Italian peninsula, winning almost every battle and capturing 150,000 prisoners. With French forces marching toward Vienna, the Austrians sued for peace and agreed to the Treaty of Campo Formio on 17 October 1797, ending the First Coalition against the Republic.

The War of the Second Coalition began in 1798 with the French invasion of Egypt, headed by Napoleon. The allies took the opportunity presented by the French effort in the Middle East to regain territories lost from the First Coalition. The war began well for the allies in Europe, where they gradually pushed the French out of Italy and invaded Switzerland – racking up victories at the battles of Magnano, Cassano, and Novi along the way. However, their efforts largely unraveled with the French victory at Zurich in September 1799, which caused Russia to drop out of the war. Meanwhile, Napoleon's forces won a series of battles at the Pyramids, Mount Tabor, and Abukir but lost a crucial Siege of Acre in 1799 that turned the tide of the campaign. The perceived victories in Egypt further enhanced Napoleon's popularity back in France, and he returned to France in the autumn of 1799, but leaving the French army in a desperate situation in Egypt as the Egyptian campaign ultimately ended in failure. Furthermore, the Royal Navy had won the Battle of the Nile in 1798, further strengthening British control of the Mediterranean and weakening the French Navy for the rest of the Revolutionary and Napoleonic Wars.

Napoleon's arrival from Egypt led to the fall of the French Directory in the Coup of 18 Brumaire; Napoleon installed himself as consul. Napoleon then reorganized the French army and launched an assault against the Austrians in Italy during the spring of 1800. This brought a decisive French victory at the Battle of Marengo in June 1800, after which the Austrians withdrew from the peninsula once again. Another crushing French victory at Hohenlinden in Bavaria forced the Austrians to seek peace for a second time, leading to the Treaty of Lunéville in 1801. With Austria and Russia out of the war, Britain found itself increasingly isolated and agreed to the Treaty of Amiens with Napoleon's government in 1802, concluding the Revolutionary Wars. However, the lingering tensions proved too difficult to contain, and the Napoleonic Wars began over a year later with the formation of the Third Coalition, continuing the series of Coalition Wars.

== Geopolitical context ==
When the French Revolution began at the end of the 18th century, the European continent had five great powers: Great Britain, France, Austria, Russia, and Prussia. Weak European states included Sweden, Spain, Poland-Lithuania, Dutch Republic, and the Ottoman Empire. Western Germany was divided into hundreds of principalities, cities, and minor states, some of which were independents while others were effectively controlled by Austria. The great powers had agrarian industries, except for Great Britain which was wealthy because of trade.

== War of the First Coalition ==
=== 1791–1792 ===
The key figure in initial foreign reaction to the French Revolution was Holy Roman Emperor Leopold II, brother of Queen Marie Antoinette of France. Leopold had initially looked on the revolution with equanimity but became more disturbed as the revolution became more radical, although he still hoped to avoid war. On 27 August 1791, Leopold and King Frederick William II of Prussia, in consultation with emigrant French nobles, issued the Declaration of Pillnitz, which declared the interest of the monarchs of Europe in the well-being of King Louis XVI of France and his family, and threatened vague but severe consequences if anything should befall them. Although Leopold saw the Pillnitz Declaration as a non-committal gesture to placate the sentiments of French monarchists and nobles, it was seen in France as a serious threat and was denounced by the revolutionary leaders.

France issued an ultimatum demanding that Leopold renounce any hostile alliances and withdraw his troops from the French border. The reply was evasive, and the French Legislative Assembly voted for war on 20 April 1792 against Francis II, the successor of Leopold II, after a long list of grievances presented by foreign minister Charles François Dumouriez. Dumouriez prepared an immediate invasion of the Austrian Netherlands, where he expected the local population to rise against Austrian rule as they had earlier in 1790. However, the revolution had thoroughly disorganized the army, and the forces raised were insufficient for the invasion. Following the declaration of war, French soldiers deserted en masse and in one case murdered their general, Théobald Dillon.

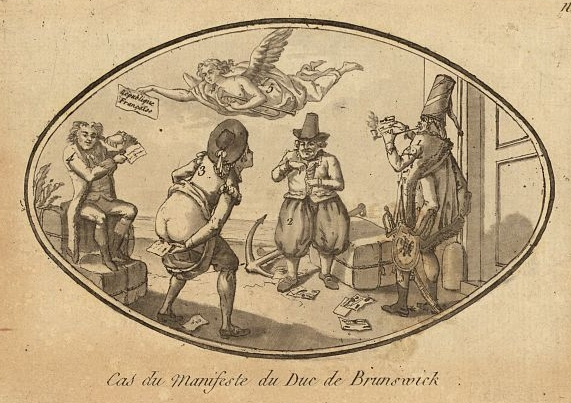
Anonymous caricature depicting the treatment given to the Brunswick Manifesto by the French population

While the revolutionary government frantically raised fresh troops and reorganized its armies, a mostly Prussian allied army under Charles William Ferdinand, Duke of Brunswick assembled at Koblenz on the Rhine. The duke then issued a proclamation called the Brunswick Manifesto (July 1792), written by the French king's cousin, Louis Joseph de Bourbon, Prince de Condé, the leader of an émigré corps within the allied army, which declared the allies' intent to restore the king to his full powers and to treat any person or town who opposed them as rebels to be condemned to death by martial law. This, however, had the effect of strengthening the resolve of the revolutionary army and government to oppose them by any means necessary.

On 10 August, a crowd stormed the Tuileries Palace, seizing the king and his family. The Commune of Paris later assumed the powers of the municipality. On 19 August 1792, the invasion by Brunswick's army commenced, with Brunswick's army easily taking the fortresses of Longwy and Verdun. The invasion continued, but at the Battle of Valmy on 20 September, the invaders came to a stalemate against Dumouriez and Kellermann in which the highly professional French artillery distinguished itself. Although the battle was a tactical draw, it gave a great boost to French morale. Further, the Prussians, finding that the campaign had been longer and more costly than predicted, decided that the cost and risk of continued fighting was too great and, with winter approaching, they decided to retreat from France to preserve their army. On 21 September the monarchy was formally abolished as the First Republic was declared.

Meanwhile, the French had been successful on several other fronts, occupying Savoy and Nice, which were parts of the Savoyard state, while General Custine invaded Germany, occupying several German towns along the Rhine and reaching as far as Frankfurt. Dumouriez went on the offensive in the Austrian Netherlands once again, winning a great victory over the Austrians at the Battle of Jemappes on 6 November and occupying the entire country by the beginning of winter.

=== 1793 ===
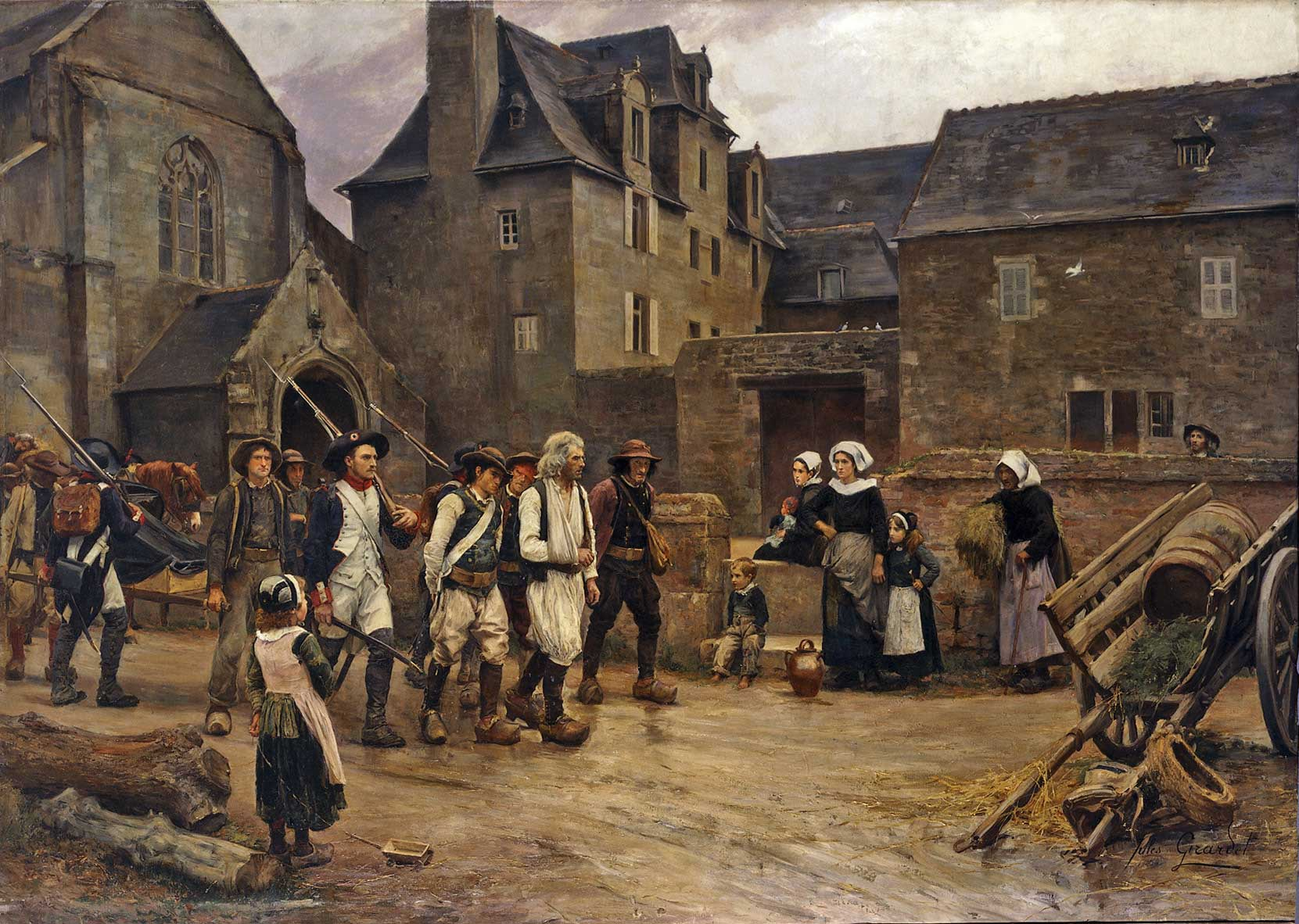
While the First Coalition attacked the new Republic, France faced civil war and counter-revolutionary guerrilla war. Here, several insurgents of the Chouannerie have been taken prisoner.

Spain and Portugal entered the anti-French coalition in January 1793. Britain began military preparations in late 1792 and declared that war was inevitable unless France gave up its conquests, notwithstanding French assurances they would not attack Holland or annex the Low Countries. Britain expelled the French ambassador following the execution of Louis XVI and on 1 February, France responded by declaring war on Great Britain and the Dutch Republic.

France drafted hundreds of thousands of men, beginning a policy of using mass conscription to deploy more of its manpower than the autocratic states could manage to do (first stage, with a decree of 24 February 1793 ordering the draft of 300,000 men, followed by the general mobilization of all the young men able to be drafted, through the famous decree of 23 August 1793). Nonetheless, the Coalition allies launched a determined drive to invade France during the Flanders Campaign.

France suffered severe reverses at first. They were driven out of the Austrian Netherlands, and serious revolts flared in the west and south of France. One of these, at Toulon, was the first serious taste of action for an unknown young artillery officer Napoleon Bonaparte. He contributed to the siege of the city and its harbour by planning an effective assault with well-placed artillery batteries raining projectiles down on rebel positions. This performance helped make his reputation as a capable tactician, and it fueled his meteoric rise to military and political power.

By the end of the year, large new armies had turned back foreign invaders, and the Reign of Terror, a fierce policy of repression, had suppressed internal revolts. The French military was in the ascendant. Lazare Carnot, a scientist and prominent member of the Committee of Public Safety, organized the fourteen armies of the Republic, and was then nicknamed the Organizer of the Victory.

=== 1794 ===
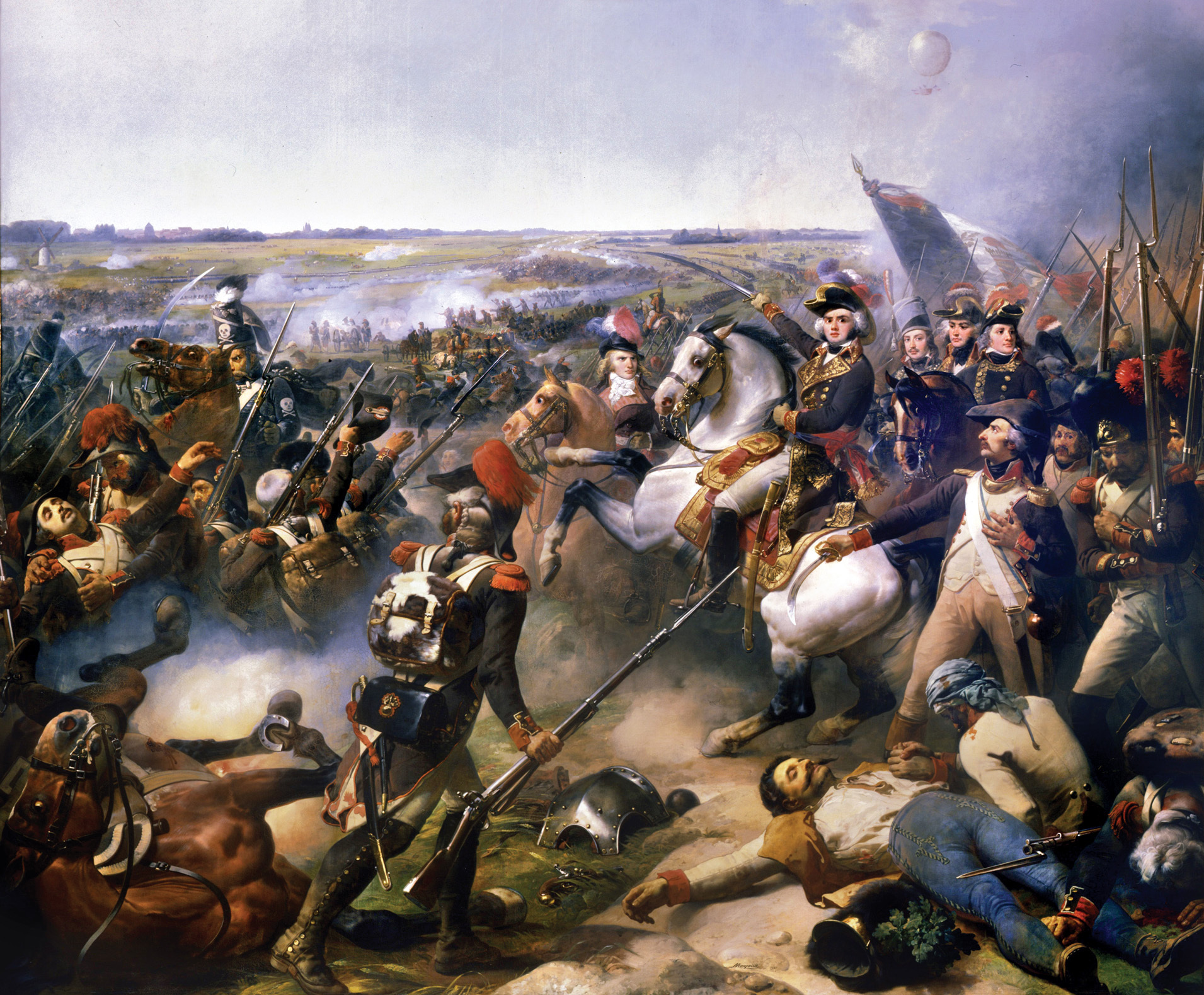
The battle of Fleurus, 26 June 1794

The year 1794 brought increased success to the French armies. On the Alpine frontier, there was little change, with the French invasion of Piedmont failing. On the Spanish border, the French under General Dugommier rallied from their defensive positions at Bayonne and Perpignan, driving the Spanish out of Roussillon and invading Catalonia. Dugommier was killed in the Battle of the Black Mountain in November.

On the northern front in the Flanders Campaign, the Austrians and French both prepared offensives in Belgium, with the Austrians besieging Landrecies and advancing towards Mons and Maubeuge. The French prepared an offensive on multiple fronts, with two armies in Flanders under Pichegru and Moreau, and Jourdan attacking from the German border. The French withstood several damaging but inconclusive actions before regaining the initiative at the battles of Tourcoing and Fleurus in June. The French armies drove the Austrians, British, and Dutch beyond the Rhine, occupying Belgium, the Rhineland, and the south of the Netherlands.

On the middle Rhine front in July, General Michaud's Army of the Rhine attempted two offensives in July in the Vosges, the second of which was successful but not followed up, allowing for a Prussian counter-attack in September. Otherwise this sector of the front was largely quiet over the course of the year.

At sea, the French Atlantic Fleet succeeded in holding off a British attempt to interdict a vital cereal convoy from the United States on the Glorious First of June, though at the cost of one quarter of its strength. In the Caribbean, the British fleet landed in Martinique in February, taking the whole island by 24 March and holding it until the Treaty of Amiens, and in Guadeloupe in April, where they captured the island briefly but were driven out by Victor Hugues later in the year. In the Mediterranean, following the British evacuation of Toulon, the Corsican leader Pasquale Paoli agreed with admiral Samuel Hood to place Corsica under British protection in return for assistance capturing French garrisons at Saint-Florent, Bastia, and Calvi, creating the short-lived Anglo-Corsican Kingdom.

By the end of the year French armies had won victories on all fronts, and as the year closed they began advancing into the Netherlands.

=== 1795 ===
The year opened with French forces in the process of attacking the Dutch Republic in the middle of winter. The Dutch people rallied to the French call and started the Batavian Revolution. City after city was occupied by the French. The Dutch fleet was captured, and the stadtholder William V fled to be replaced by a popular Batavian Republic, a sister republic which supported the revolutionary cause and signed a treaty with the French, ceding the territories of North Brabant and Maastricht to France on 16 May.

With the Netherlands falling, Prussia also decided to leave the coalition, signing the Peace of Basel on 6 April, ceding the west bank of the Rhine to France. This freed Prussia to finish the Third Partition of Poland.

In March a revolt broke out in Grenada which was supported by the First French Republican forces of Martinique, and French troops were sent in limited quantities to the island to fight under the command of General Julien Fédon, a mulatto from Martinique. In April most of the island was under the control of the rebels and they repelled various attacks by the British troops led by Louis Cazot LaGrenade, including an attack which led to the spontaneous execution of the governor who was captured earlier in the revolt.

The French army in Spain advanced in Catalonia while taking Bilbao and Vitoria and marching toward Castile. By 10 July, Spain also decided to make peace, recognizing the revolutionary government and ceding the territory of Santo Domingo, but returning to the pre-war borders in Europe. This left the armies on the Pyrenees free to march east and reinforce the armies on the Alps, and the combined army overran Piedmont.

Meanwhile, in Africa and Asia, the Dutch-controlled Cape Colony and Ceylon were captured by the British.

Meanwhile, Britain's attempt to reinforce the rebels in the Vendée by landing troops at Quiberon failed, and a conspiracy to overthrow the republican government from within ended when Napoleon Bonaparte's garrison used cannon to fire grapeshot into the attacking mob (which led to the establishment of the Directory).

On the Rhine frontier, General Pichegru, negotiating with the exiled Royalists, betrayed his army and forced the evacuation of Mannheim and the failure of the siege of Mainz by Jourdan. This was a moderate setback to the position of the French.

In northern Italy, victory at the Battle of Loano in November gave France access to the Italian peninsula.

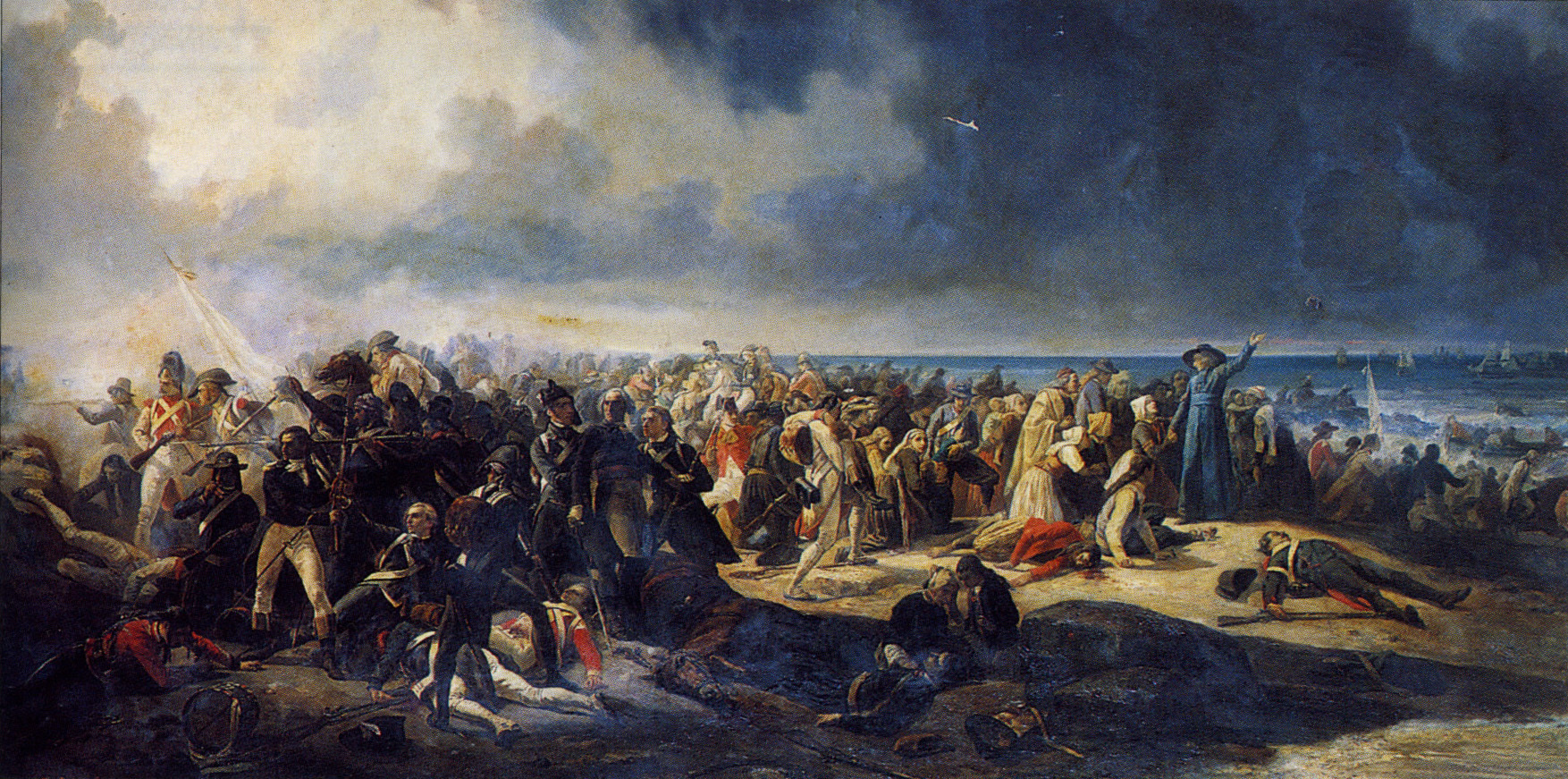
Armée des Émigrés at the Battle of Quiberon

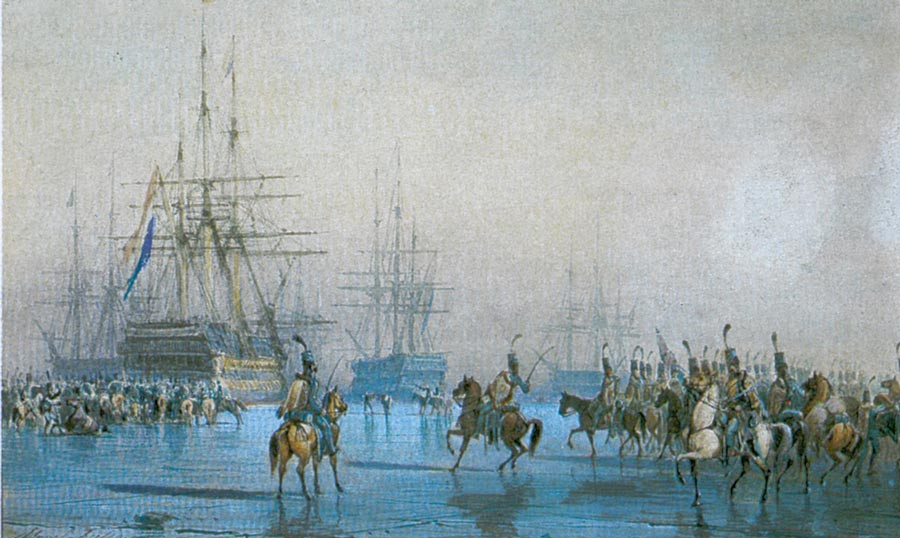
Capture of the Dutch fleet by the French hussars

=== 1796 ===
The French prepared a great advance on three fronts, with Jourdan and Moreau on the Rhine, and Bonaparte in Italy. The three armies were to link up in Tyrol and march on Vienna. Jourdan and Moreau advanced rapidly into Germany, and Moreau had reached Bavaria and the edge of Tyrol by September, but Jourdan was defeated by Archduke Charles at Amberg, and both armies were forced to retreat back across the Rhine.

Napoleon, on the other hand, was completely successful in a daring invasion of Italy. He left Paris on 11 March for Nice to take over the weak and poorly supplied Army of Italy, arriving on 26 March. The army was already being reorganised and supplied when he arrived, and he found that the situation was rapidly improving. He was soon able to carry out the plan for the invasion of Italy that he had been advocating for years, which provided for an advance over the Apennines near Altare to attack the enemy position of Ceva.

The Montenotte Campaign opened after Johann Beaulieu's Austrian forces attacked the extreme French eastern flank near Genoa on 10 April. Bonaparte countered by attacking and crushing the isolated right wing of the allied armies at the Battle of Montenotte on 12 April. The next day he defeated an Austro-Sardinian force at the Battle of Millesimo. He then won a victory at the Second Battle of Dego, driving the Austrians northeast, away from their Piedmontese allies. Satisfied that the Austrians were temporarily inert, Bonaparte harried Michelangelo Colli's Piedmontese at Ceva and San Michele Mondovi before whipping them at the Battle of Mondovì. A week later, on 28 April, the Piedmontese signed the Armistice of Cherasco, withdrawing from the hostilities. On 18 May they signed the Treaty of Paris (1796), ceding Savoy and Nice and allowing the French bases to be used against Austria.

After a short pause, Napoleon carried out a brilliant flanking manoeuvre, and crossed the Po at Piacenza, nearly cutting the Austrian line of retreat. The Austrians escaped after the Battle of Fombio, but had their rear-guard mauled at Lodi on 10 May, after which the French took Milan. Bonaparte then advanced eastwards again, drove off the Austrians in the Battle of Borghetto and in June began the Siege of Mantua. Mantua was the strongest Austrian base in Italy. Meanwhile, the Austrians retreated north into the foothills of the Tyrol.

During July and August, Austria sent a fresh army into Italy under Dagobert Wurmser. Wurmser attacked toward Mantua along the east side of Lake Garda, sending Peter Quasdanovich down the west side in an effort to envelop Bonaparte. Bonaparte exploited the Austrian mistake of dividing their forces to defeat them in detail, but in so doing, he abandoned the siege of Mantua, which held out for another six months (Carl von Clausewitz mentioned in On War that the siege might have been able to be kept up if Bonaparte had circumvallated the city). Quasdanovich was overcome at Lonato on 3 August and Wurmser at Castiglione on 5 August. Wurmser retreated to the Tyrol, and Bonaparte resumed the siege.

In September, Bonaparte marched north against Trento in Tyrol, but Wurmser had already marched toward Mantua by the Brenta valley, leaving Paul Davidovich's force to hold off the French. Bonaparte overran the holding force at the Battle of Rovereto. Then he followed Wurmser down the Brenta valley, to fall upon and defeat the Austrians at the Battle of Bassano on 8 September. Wurmser elected to march for Mantua with a large portion of his surviving troops. The Austrians evaded Bonaparte's attempts to intercept them but were driven into the city after a pitched battle on 15 September. This left nearly 30,000 Austrians trapped in the fortress. This number rapidly diminished due to disease, combat losses, and hunger.

The Austrians sent yet another army under József Alvinczi against Bonaparte in November. Again the Austrians divided their effort, sending Davidovich's corps from the north while Alvinczi's main body attacked from the east. At first they proved victorious over the French at Bassano, Calliano, and Caldiero. But Bonaparte ultimately defeated Alvinczi in the Battle of Arcole southeast of Verona. The French then turned on Davidovich in great strength and chased him into the Tyrol. Wurmser's only sortie was late and ineffectual.

The rebellion in the Vendée was also finally crushed in 1796 by Hoche, but Hoche's attempt to land a large invasion force in Ireland was unsuccessful.

By mid-1796 the Rebellion of the island of Grenada had been destroyed by the British because the rebels had run out of supplies and were isolated. The British attacked the camp at Belvedere and the rebels surrendered nine days after the disappearance of Fédon. The end of the revolt was the end of French control and influence in Grenada and the lesser Antilles.

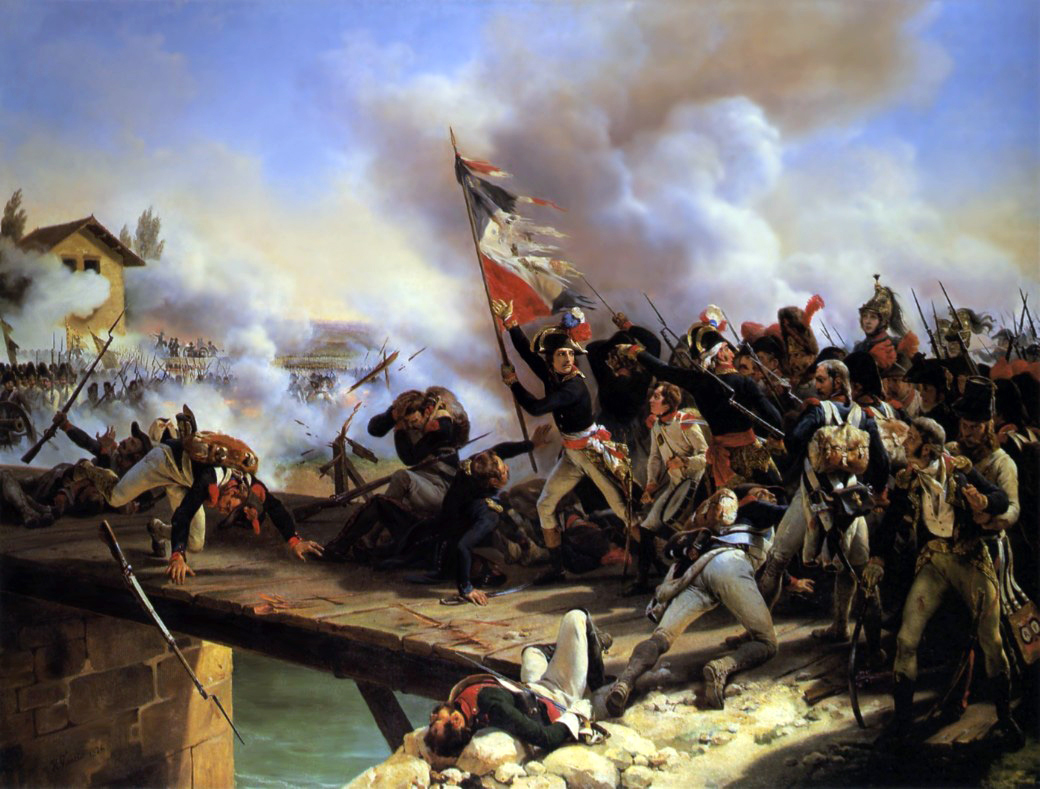
The Crossing of the Arcole Bridge by Horace Vernet. General Bonaparte and his troops crossing the bridge of Arcole

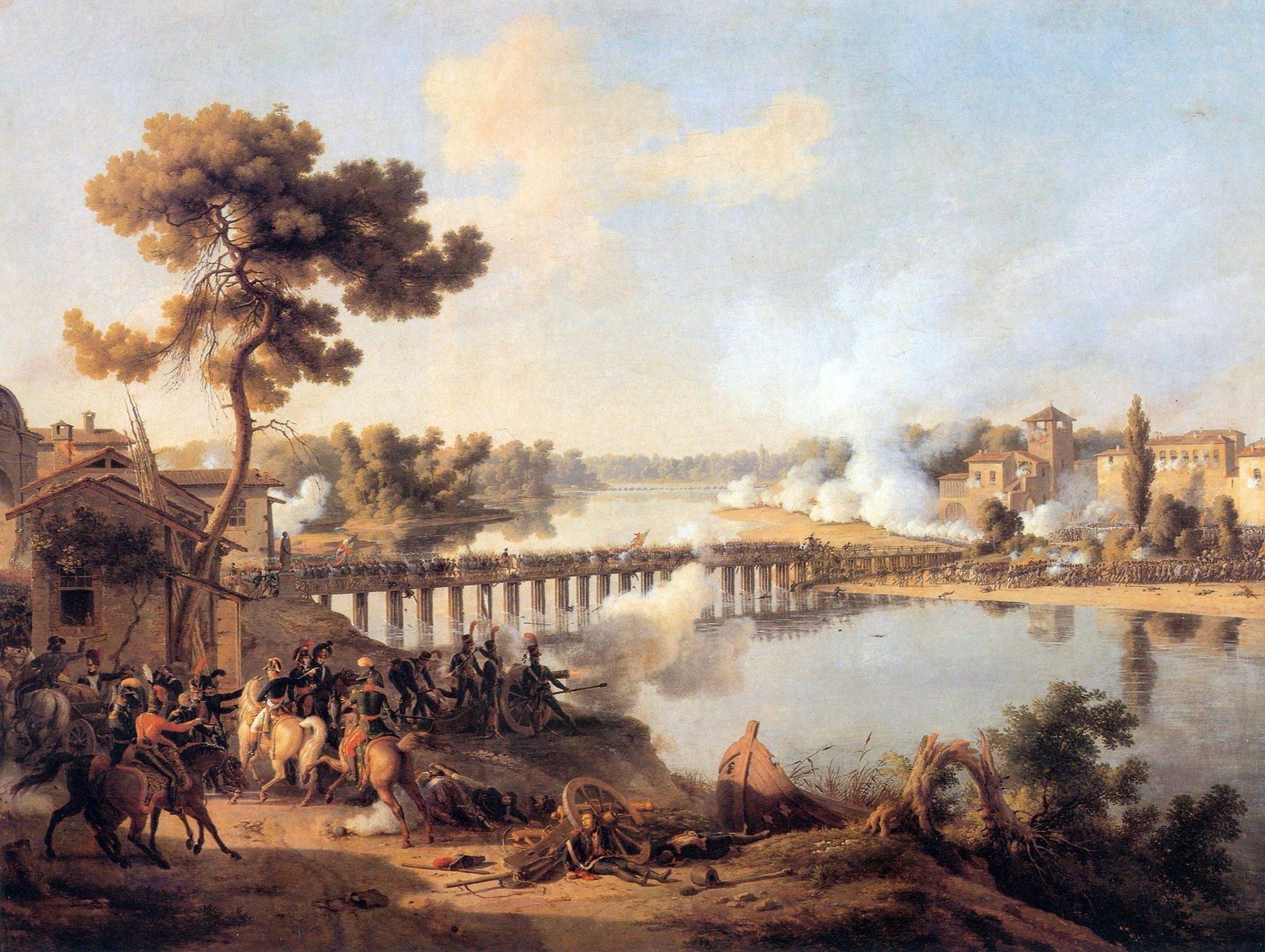
The Battle of Lodi by Louis-François Lejeune. Napoleon Bonaparte defeats the Austrians at the Battle of Lodi

=== 1797 ===
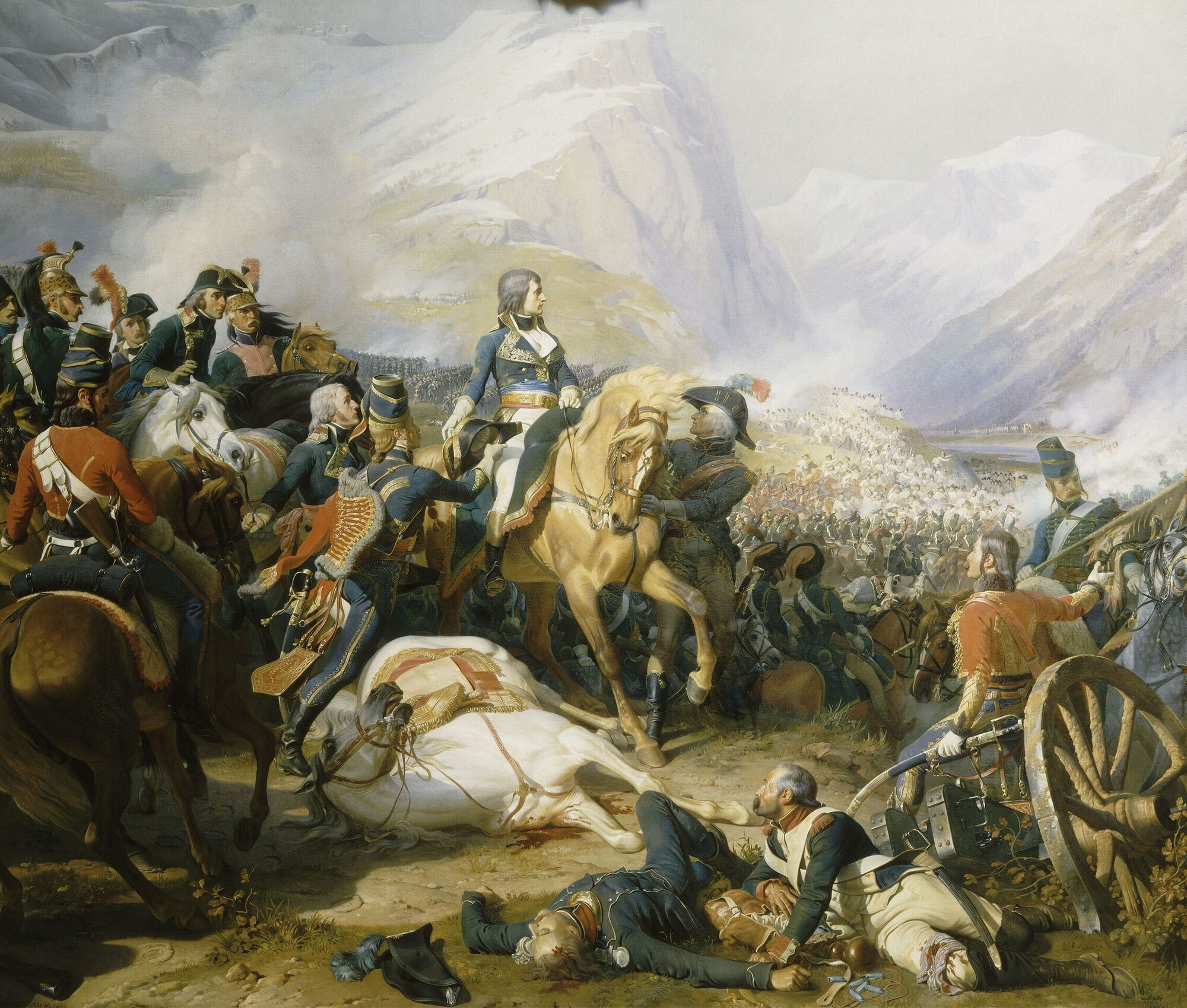
Napoleon Bonaparte at the Battle of Rivoli

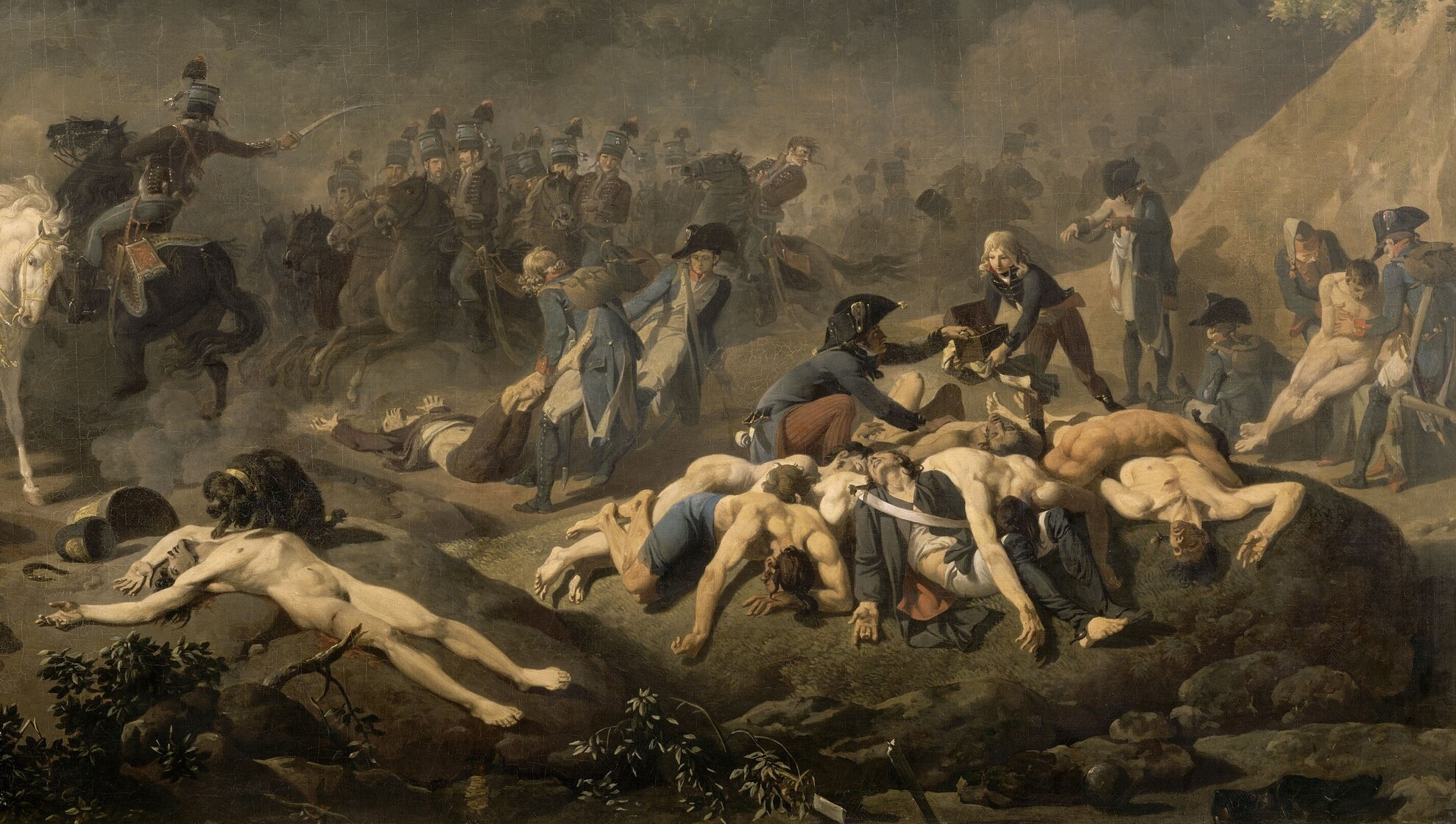
Soldiers killed in battle in 1797

On 14 February, British admiral Jervis met and defeated a Spanish fleet off Portugal at the Battle of Cape St. Vincent. This prevented the Spanish fleet from rendezvousing with the French, removing a threat of invasion to Britain. However, the British fleet was weakened over the rest of the year by the Spithead and Nore mutinies, which kept many ships in port through the summer.

On 22 February French invasion force consisting of 1,400 troops from the La Legion Noire (The Black Legion) under the command of Irish American Colonel William Tate landed near Fishguard (Wales). They were met by a quickly assembled group of around 500 British reservists, militia and sailors under the command of John Campbell, 1st Baron Cawdor. After brief clashes with the local civilian population and Lord Cawdor's forces on 23 February, Tate was forced into an unconditional surrender by 24 February.

In Italy, Napoleon's armies were laying siege to Mantua at the beginning of the year, and a second attempt by Austrians under Joseph Alvinczy to raise the siege was driven off at the Battle of Rivoli, where the French scored a decisive victory. Finally, on 2 February, Wurmser surrendered Mantua and 18,000 troops. The Papal forces sued for peace, which was granted at Tolentino on 19 February. Napoleon was now free to attack the Austrian heartland. He advanced directly toward Austria over the Julian Alps, sending Barthélemy Joubert to invade the Tyrol.

Archduke Charles of Austria hurried from the German front to defend Austria, but he was defeated at the Battle of Tagliamento on 16 March, and Napoleon proceeded into Austria, occupying Klagenfurt and preparing for a rendezvous with Joubert in front of Vienna. In Germany, the armies of Hoche and Moreau crossed the Rhine again in April after the previous year's failure. The victories of Napoleon had frightened the Austrians into making peace, and they concluded the Peace of Leoben in April, ending hostilities. However, his absence from Italy had allowed the outbreak of the revolt known as the Veronese Easters on 17 April, which was put down eight days later.

Although Britain remained at war with France, this effectively ended the First Coalition. Austria later signed the Treaty of Campo Formio, ceding the Austrian Netherlands to France and recognizing the French border at the Rhine. Austria and France also partitioned the Republic of Venice between them.

=== 1798 ===
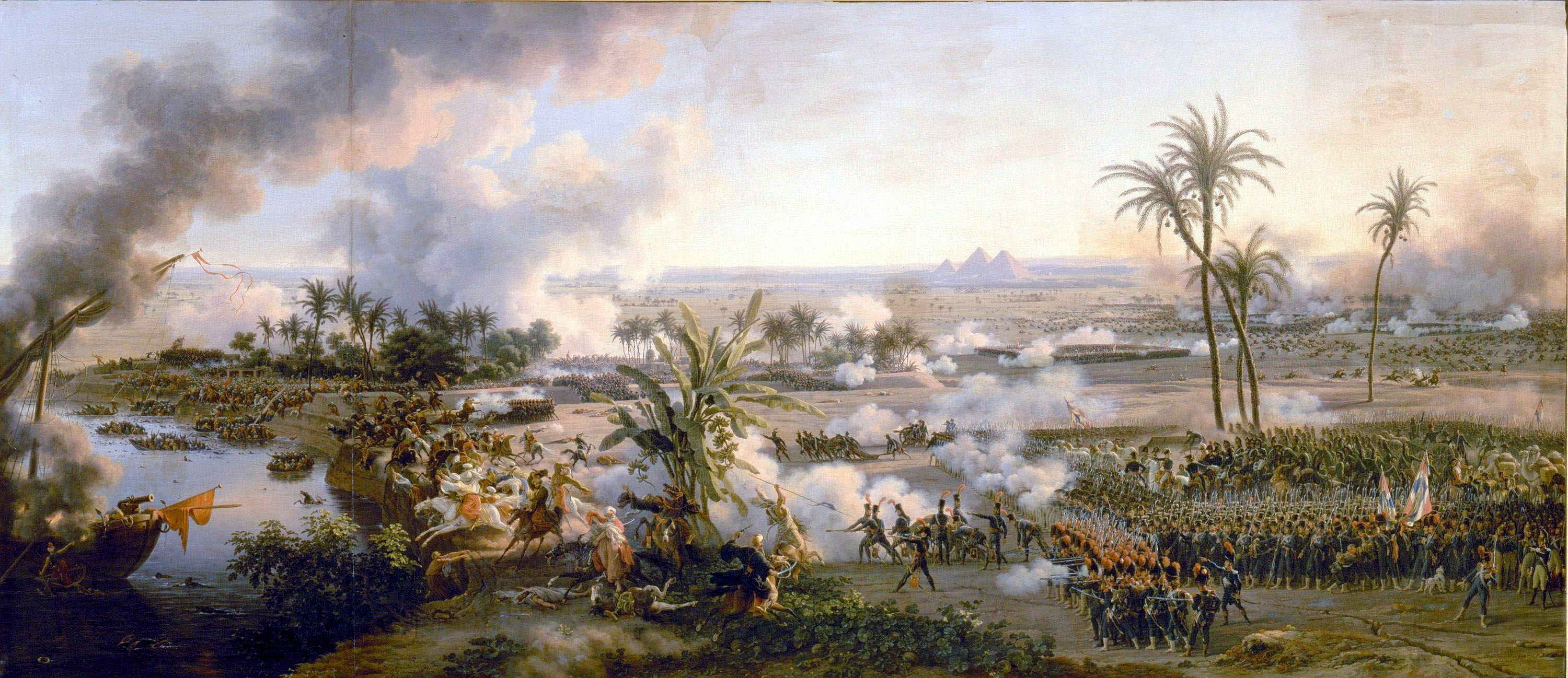
In July 1798, French forces under Napoleon annihilated an Egyptian army at the Battle of the Pyramids. The victory facilitated the conquest of Egypt and remains one of the most important battles of the era.

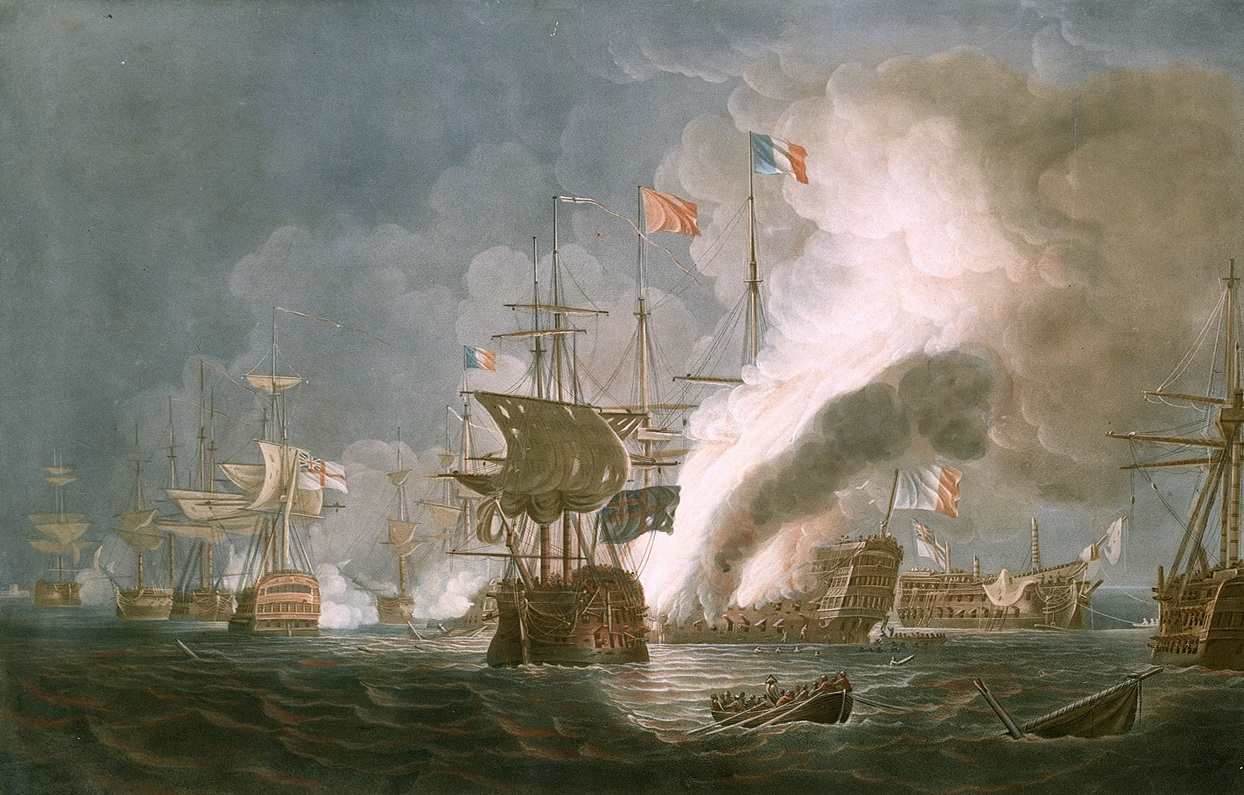
Battle of the Nile, August 1798. The British fleet bears down on the French line.

With only Britain left to fight and not enough of a navy to fight a direct war, Napoleon conceived of an invasion of Egypt in 1798, which satisfied his personal desire for glory and the Directory's desire to have him far from Paris. The military objective of the expedition is not entirely clear, but may have been to threaten British dominance in India.

Napoleon sailed from Toulon to Alexandria, taking Malta on the way, and landing in June. Marching to Cairo, he won a great victory at the Battle of the Pyramids; however, his fleet was sunk by Nelson at the Battle of the Nile, stranding him in Egypt. Napoleon spent the remainder of the year consolidating his position in Egypt.

The French government also took advantage of internal strife in Switzerland to invade, establishing the Helvetic Republic and annexing Geneva. French troops also deposed Pope Pius VI, establishing a republic in Rome.

An expeditionary force was sent to County Mayo, in Ireland, when it was part of the Republic of Connacht, to assist in the rebellion against Britain in the summer of 1798. It had some success against British forces, most notably at Castlebar, but was ultimately routed while trying to reach Dublin. French ships sent to assist them were captured by the Royal Navy off County Donegal.

The French were also under pressure in the Southern Netherlands and Luxembourg where the local people revolted against conscription and anti-religious violence (Peasants' War). The French had occupied this territory in 1794, but it was officially theirs from 1797 due to a treaty with Austria. The French forces easily handled the Peasants' rebellion in the Southern Netherlands, and were able to put down the revolting forces in under 2 months.

The French in 1798 fought an undeclared war at sea against the United States, that was known variously as the "Quasi-War", the "Half War" and the "Pirate Wars". It was resolved peaceably with the Convention of 1800.

== War of the Second Coalition ==
Britain and Austria organized a new coalition against France in 1798, including for the first time the Russian Empire, although no action occurred until 1799 except against the Kingdom of Naples.

=== 1799 ===
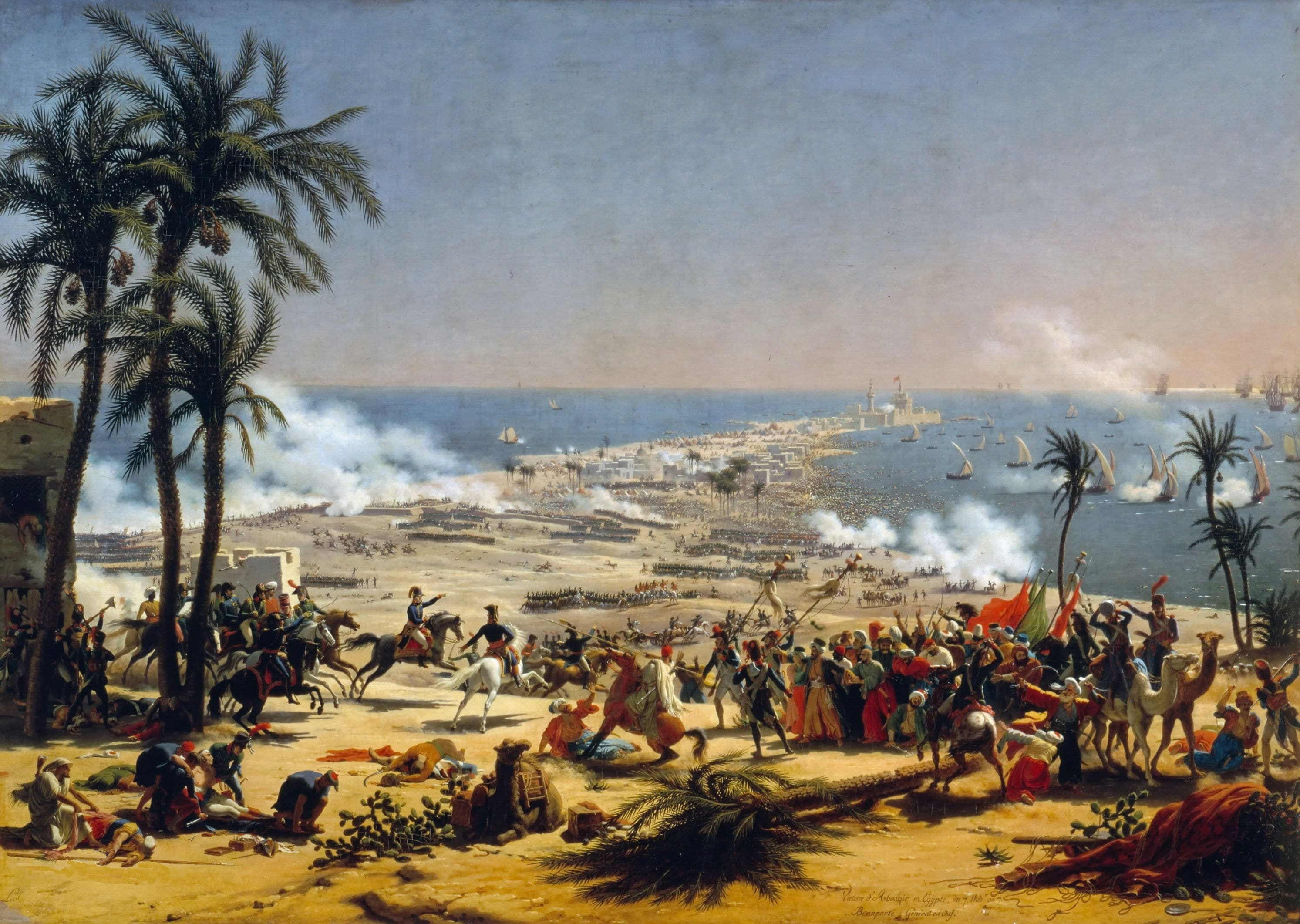
The Battle of Aboukir by Louis-François Lejeune. The Battle of Abukir in 1799

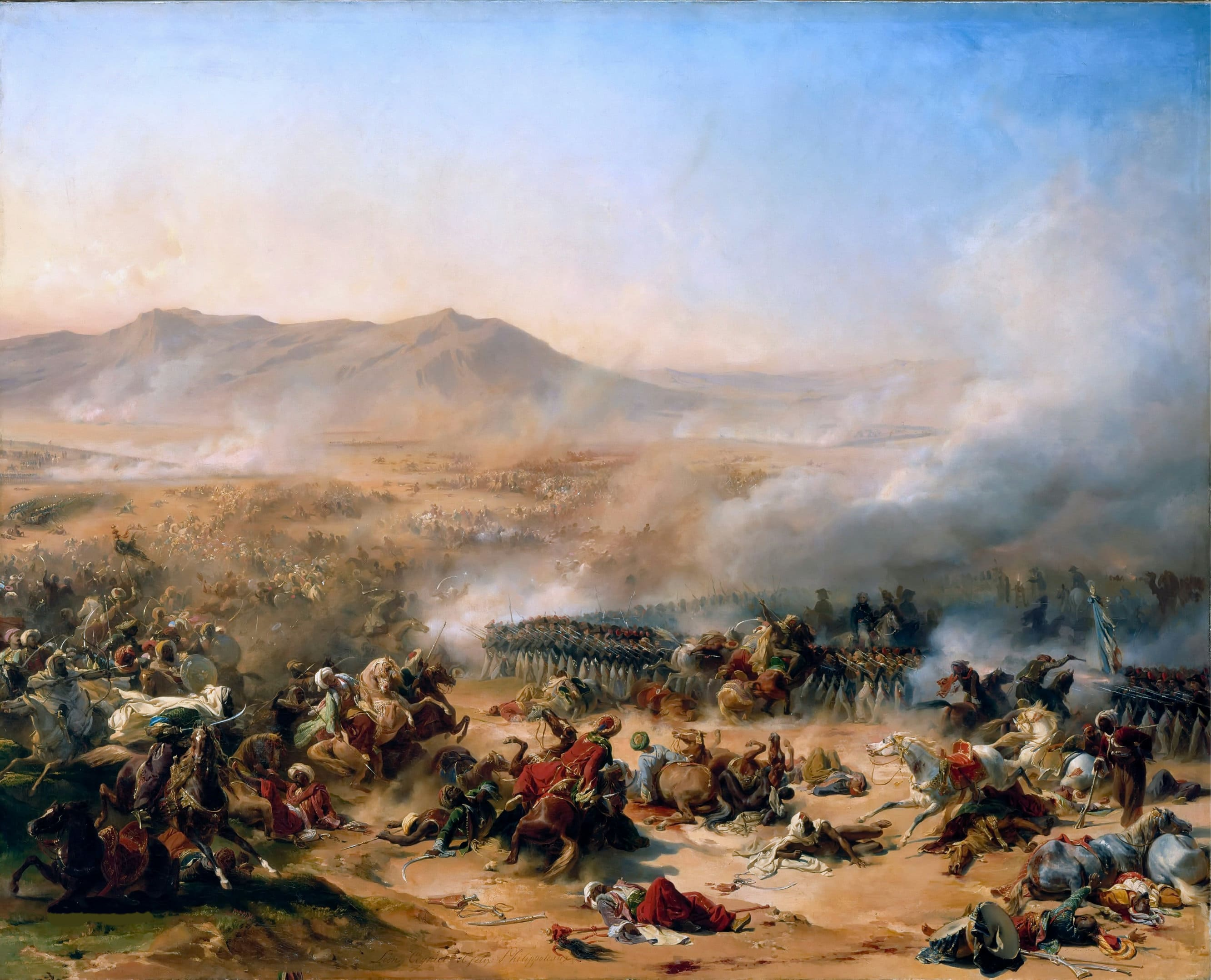
The Battle of Mount Tabor against the Ottomans

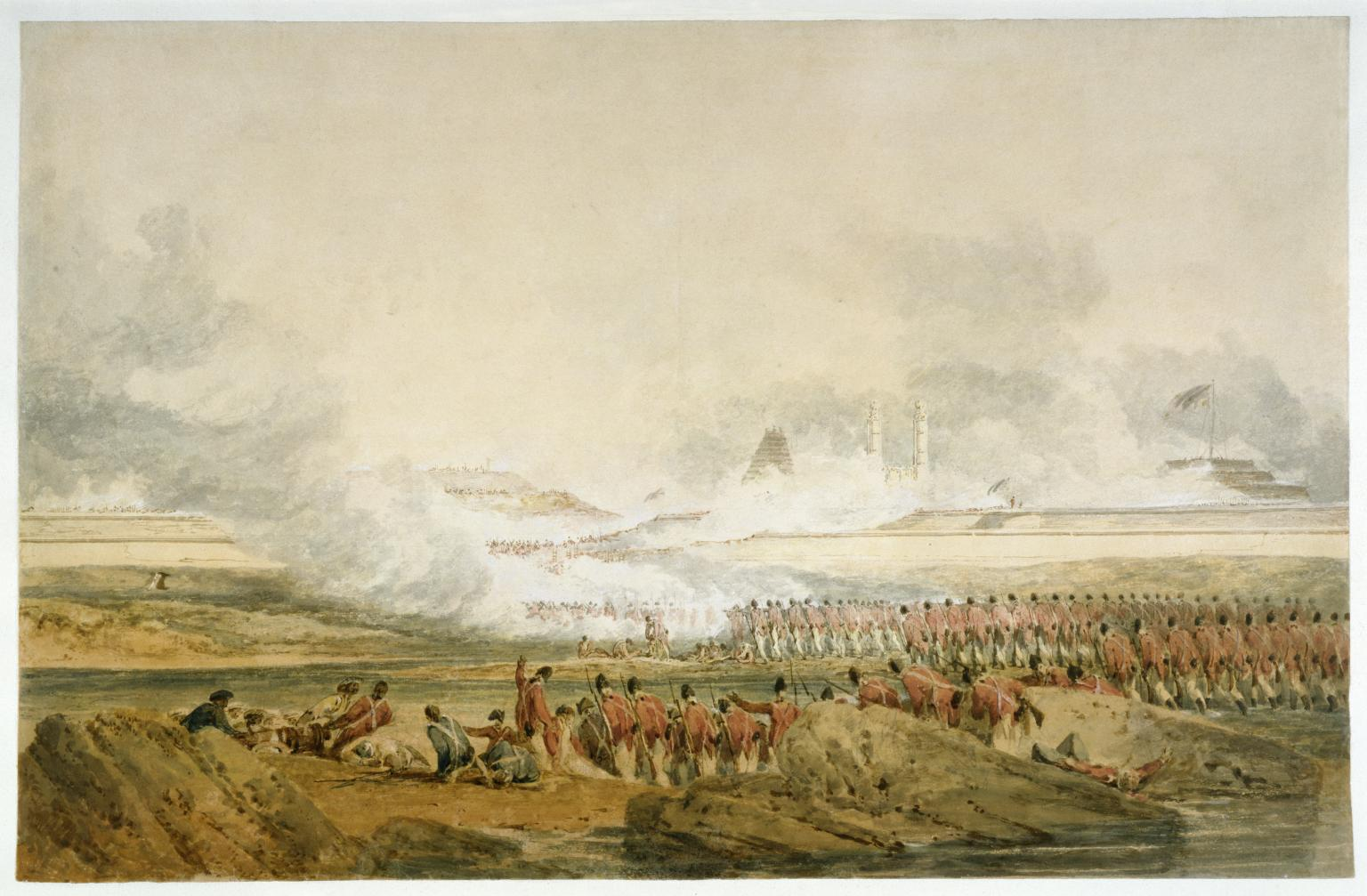
The Siege of Seringapatam by Joseph Mallord William Turner

In Egypt, Napoleon had consolidated his control of the country for the time being. Soon after the beginning of the year, he mounted an invasion of Ottoman Syria, capturing El Arish and Jaffa. On 17 March, he laid siege to Acre, and defeated an Ottoman effort to relieve the city at the Battle of Mount Tabor on 17 April. However, his repeated assaults on Acre were driven back by Ottoman and British forces under the command of Jezzar Pasha and Sir Sidney Smith. By May, with plague rampant in his army and no sign of success against the city, Napoleon was forced to retreat into Egypt. In July, Turkey, with the help of the British navy, mounted an invasion by sea from Rhodes. Napoleon attacked the Turkish beachheads and scored a crushing victory at the Battle of Abukir, capturing or killing the entire enemy army. In August, Napoleon decided to return to Europe, hearing of the political and military crisis in France. Leaving his army behind with Kléber in command, he sailed through the British blockade to return to Paris and resolved to take control of the government there in a coup.

In India, the French allied Sultanate of Mysore under Tipu Sultan had sought French assistance since Napoleon's landing in Egypt to oppose the British whom Tipu had already fought 3 wars with till this point. In order to prevent such a thing from happening, The East India Company under the Duke of Mornington, Richard Wellesley, the Governor-General of British India invaded Mysore. Repelling Mysorean forces at the battles of Seedaseer and Mallavelly respectively, they besieged Tipu's capital at Seringapatam on April 5th, 1799, capturing it a month later where Tipu would die in the midst of battle. Thereafter, placing the previously ruling Wadiyar dynasty on the throne as puppets, cementing British supremacy over France in the proxy war in the East indies.

In Europe, the French Army of Observation, organized with 30,000 men in four divisions, crossed the Rhine at Kehl and Basel in March 1799. The following day, it was renamed the Army of the Danube. Under command of Jourdan, the army advanced in four columns through the Black Forest. First Division, the right wing, assembled at Hüningen, crossed at Basel and advanced eastward along the north shore of the Rhine toward Lake Constance. André Masséna, commanding the Army of Switzerland, sent a Demi-brigade to secure the Swiss town of Schaffhausen, on the north shore of the Rhine, which guaranteed communications between the two forces. The Advanced Guard crossed at Kehl, and Vandamme led it north-east through the mountains via Freudenstadt. This column eventually became the left flank. It was followed across the Rhine, also at Kehl, by the II. Division. The Third Division and the Reserve also crossed at Kehl, and then divided into two columns, III. Division traveling through the Black Forest via Oberkirch, and the Reserve, with most of the artillery and horse, by the valley at Freiburg im Breisgau, where they would find more forage, and then over the mountains past the Titisee to Löffingen and Hüfingen.

The major part of the Imperial army, under command of the Archduke Charles, had wintered immediately east of the Lech, which Jourdan knew, because he had sent agents into Germany with instructions to identify the location and strength of his enemy. This was less than 64 kilometres (40 mi) distant; any passage over the Lech was facilitated by available bridges, both of permanent construction and temporary pontoons and a traverse through friendly territory.

In March 1799, the Army of the Danube engaged in two major battles, both in the southwestern German theater. At the intensely fought Battle of Ostrach, 21–2 March 1799, the first battle of the War of the Second Coalition, Austrian forces, under the command of Archduke Charles, defeated Jourdan's Army of the Danube. The French suffered significant losses and were forced to retreat from the region, taking up new positions to the west at Meßkirch (Messkirch, Mößkirch), and then at Stockach and Engen. At the second battle, in Stockach, on 27 March 1799, the Austrian army achieved a decisive victory over the French forces, and again pushed the French army west. Jourdan instructed his generals to take up positions in the Black Forest, and he himself established a base at Hornberg. From there, General Jourdan relegated command of the army to his chief of staff, Jean Augustin Ernouf, and traveled to Paris to ask for more and better troops and, ultimately, to request a medical leave.

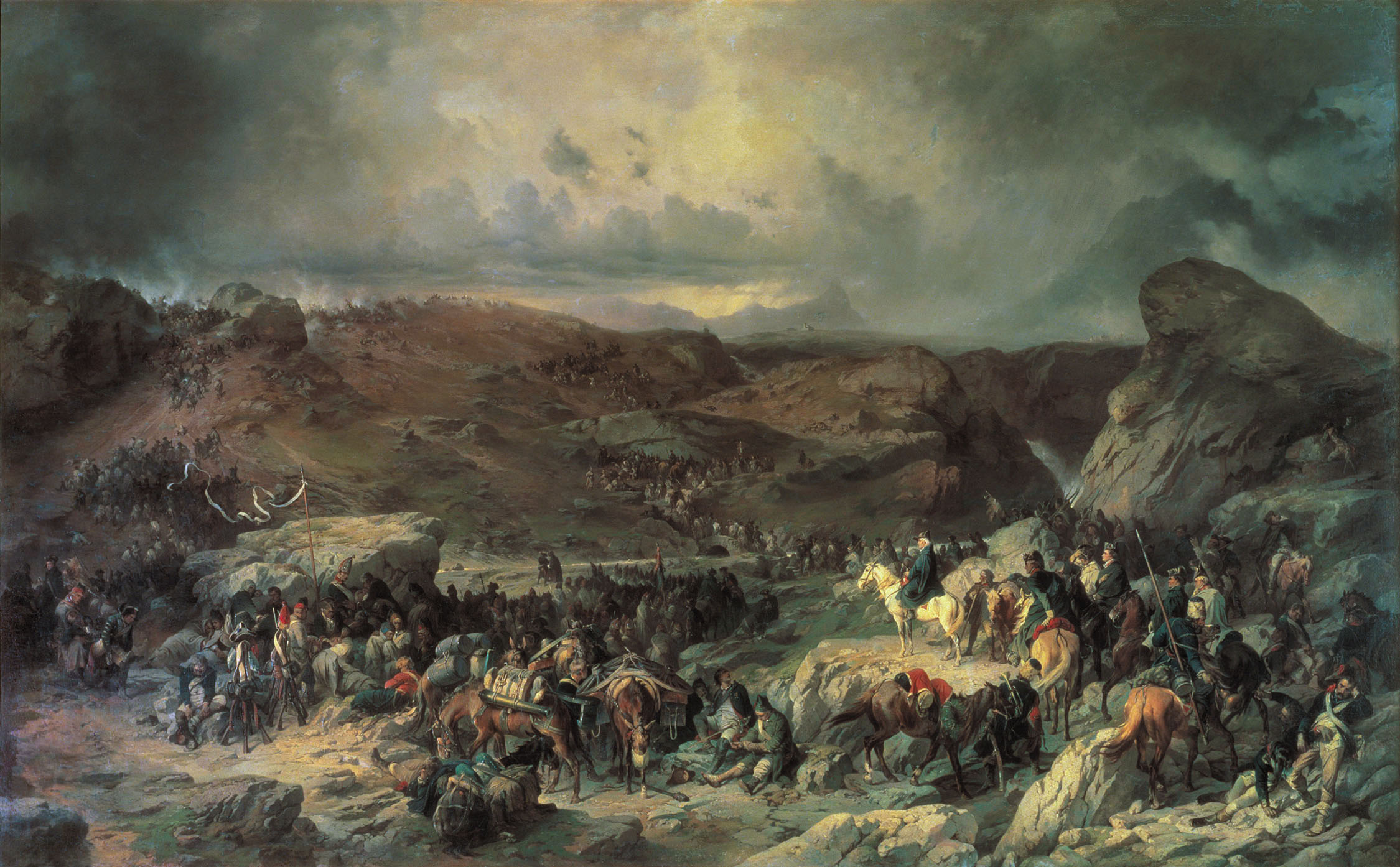
Russian General Alexander Suvorov crossing the St. Gotthard Pass during the Italian and Swiss expedition in 1799

The Army was reorganized, and a portion placed under the command of André Masséna and merged with the Army of Helvetia. Following the reorganization and change in command, the Army participated in several skirmishes and actions on the eastern part of the Swiss Plateau, including the Battle of Winterthur. After this action, three forces of the Imperial army united north of Zürich, completing a partial encirclement of Masséna's combined Army of the Danube and Army of Switzerland. A few days later, at the First Battle of Zurich, Masséna was forced west, across the Limmat. In late summer, 1799, Charles was ordered to support imperial activities in the middle Rhineland; he withdrew north across the Rhine, and marched toward Mannheim, leaving Zürich and northern Switzerland in the hands of the inexperienced Alexander Korsakov and 25,000 Russian troops. Although the highly capable Friedrich Freiherr von Hotze remained in support, his 15,000 men were not able to counter Korsakov's poor defensive arrangements. Three weeks later, at the Second Battle of Zurich, the Russian force was annihilated, and Hotze was killed south of Zürich. This left Masséna in control of northern Switzerland, and forced Alexander Suvorov into an arduous three-week march into the Vorarlberg, where his troops arrived, starving and exhausted, in mid-October.

Napoleon himself invaded Syria from Egypt, but after a failed siege of Acre retreated to Egypt, repelling a British-Turkish invasion. Alerted to the political and military crisis in France, he returned, leaving his army behind, and used his popularity and army support to mount a coup that made him First Consul, the head of the French government.

=== 1800 ===
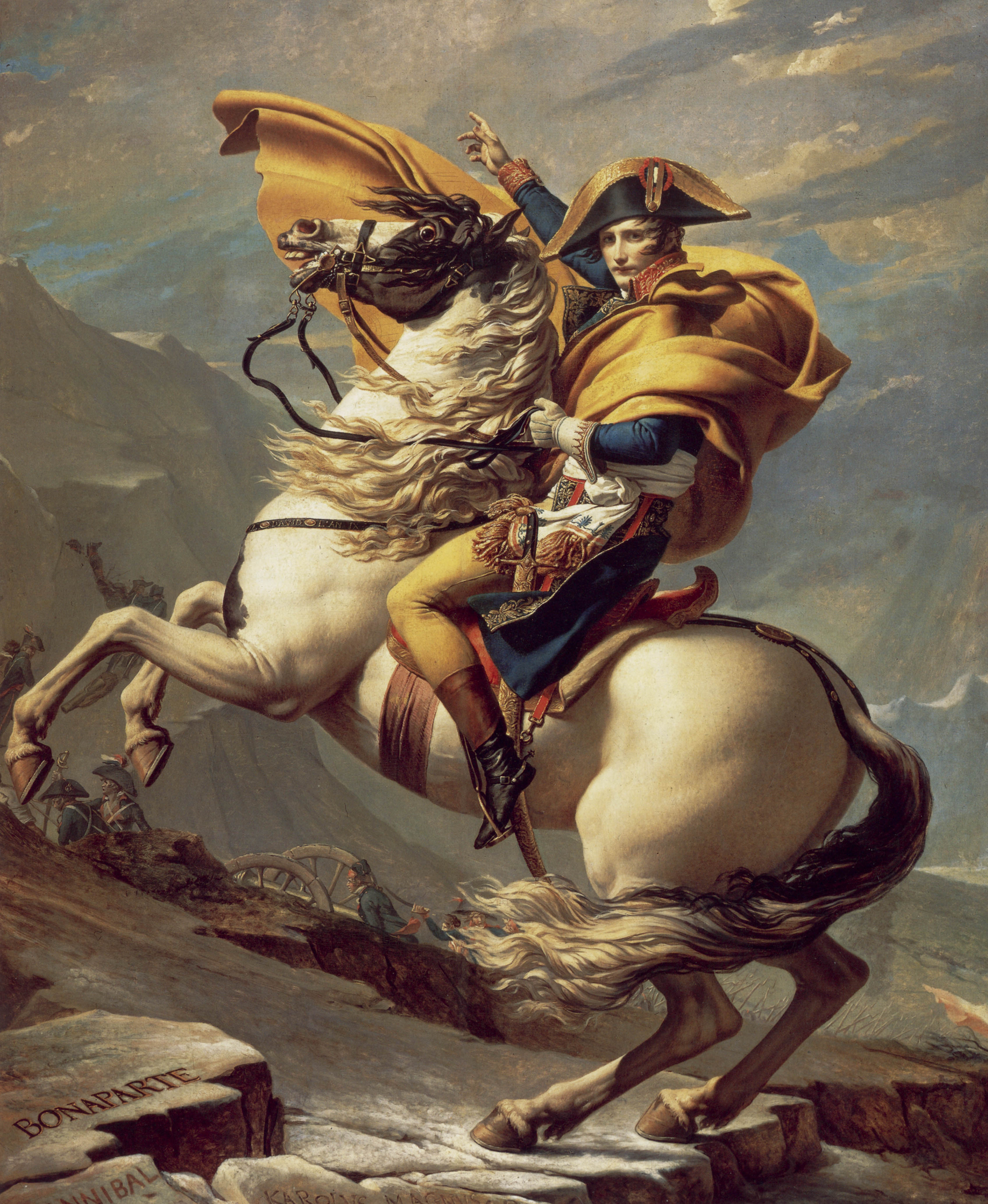
Napoleon Crossing the Alps by Jacques-Louis David. In one of the famous paintings of Napoleon, the Consul and his army are depicted crossing the Swiss Alps on their way to Italy. The daring maneuver surprised the Austrians and forced a decisive engagement at Marengo in June 1800. Victory there allowed Napoleon to strengthen his political position back in France.

In Italy, the Austrians under General Michael von Melas attacked first, and by the third week in April had advanced to the Var, with Masséna and half his army in Genoa besieged by land, by the Austrians and under tight blockade by the Royal Navy. In response Berthier moved – not to the threatened frontier, but to Geneva – and Masséna was instructed to hold Genoa until 4 June. The Army of the Reserve was joined by Napoleon, and in mid-May set out to cross the Alps to attack the Austrian rear. The bulk of the army crossed by the Great St Bernard Pass, still under snow, and by 24 May 40,000 troops were in the valley of the Po. Artillery was man-hauled over with great effort and ingenuity; however an Austrian-held fort on the Italian side (although bypassed by infantry and cavalry) prevented most of the artillery reaching the plains of Northern Italy until the start of June.

Once over the Alps, Napoleon did not proceed directly to the relief of Genoa. Instead, he advanced on Milan, to improve his lines of communication (via the Simplon and St Gotthard passes) and to threaten Melas's lines of communication with Mantua and Vienna, in the belief that this would cause Melas to raise the siege of Genoa. He entered Milan on 2 June and by crossing to the South bank of the Po completely cut Melas's communications. Taking up a strong defensive position at Stradella, he confidently awaited an attempt by the Austrian army to fight its way out.

However, Melas had not raised the siege of Genoa, and on 4 June, Masséna had duly capitulated. Napoleon then faced the possibility that, thanks to the British command of the Mediterranean, far from falling back, the Austrians could instead take Genoa as their new base and be supplied by sea. His defensive posture would not prevent this; he had to find and attack the Austrians before they could regroup. He therefore advanced from Stradella towards Alessandria, where Melas was, apparently doing nothing. Convinced that Melas was about to retreat, Napoleon sent strong detachments to block Melas's routes northwards to the Po, and southwards to Genoa. At this point, Melas attacked, and for all the brilliance of the previous campaign, Napoleon found himself at a significant disadvantage in the consequent Battle of Marengo (14 June). Napoleon and the French came under huge pressure in the early hours of the battle. Melas believed he had already won and turned over delivery of the final blow to a subordinate. Suddenly, the prompt return of a detached French force under Desaix and a vigorous French counter-attack converted the battle into a decisive French victory. The Austrians lost half of their army, but Desaix was one of the French victims.

Melas promptly entered into negotiations, which led to the Austrians evacuating Northern Italy west of the Ticino and suspending military operations in Italy. Napoleon returned to Paris after the victory, leaving Brune to consolidate in Italy and begin a march toward Austria.

In the German theater, the armies of France and Austria faced each other across the Rhine at the beginning of 1800. Feldzeugmeister Pál Kray led approximately 120,000 troops. In addition to his Austrian regulars, his force included 12,000 men from the Electorate of Bavaria, 6,000 troops from the Duchy of Württemberg, 5,000 soldiers of low quality from the Electorate of Mainz, and 7,000 militiamen from the County of Tyrol. Of these, 25,000 men were deployed east of Lake Constance to protect the Vorarlberg. Kray posted his main body of 95,000 soldiers in the L-shaped angle where the Rhine changes direction from a westward flow along the northern border of Switzerland to a northward flow along the eastern border of France. Unwisely, Kray set up his main magazine at Stockach, near the northwestern end of Lake Constance, only a day's march from French-held Switzerland.

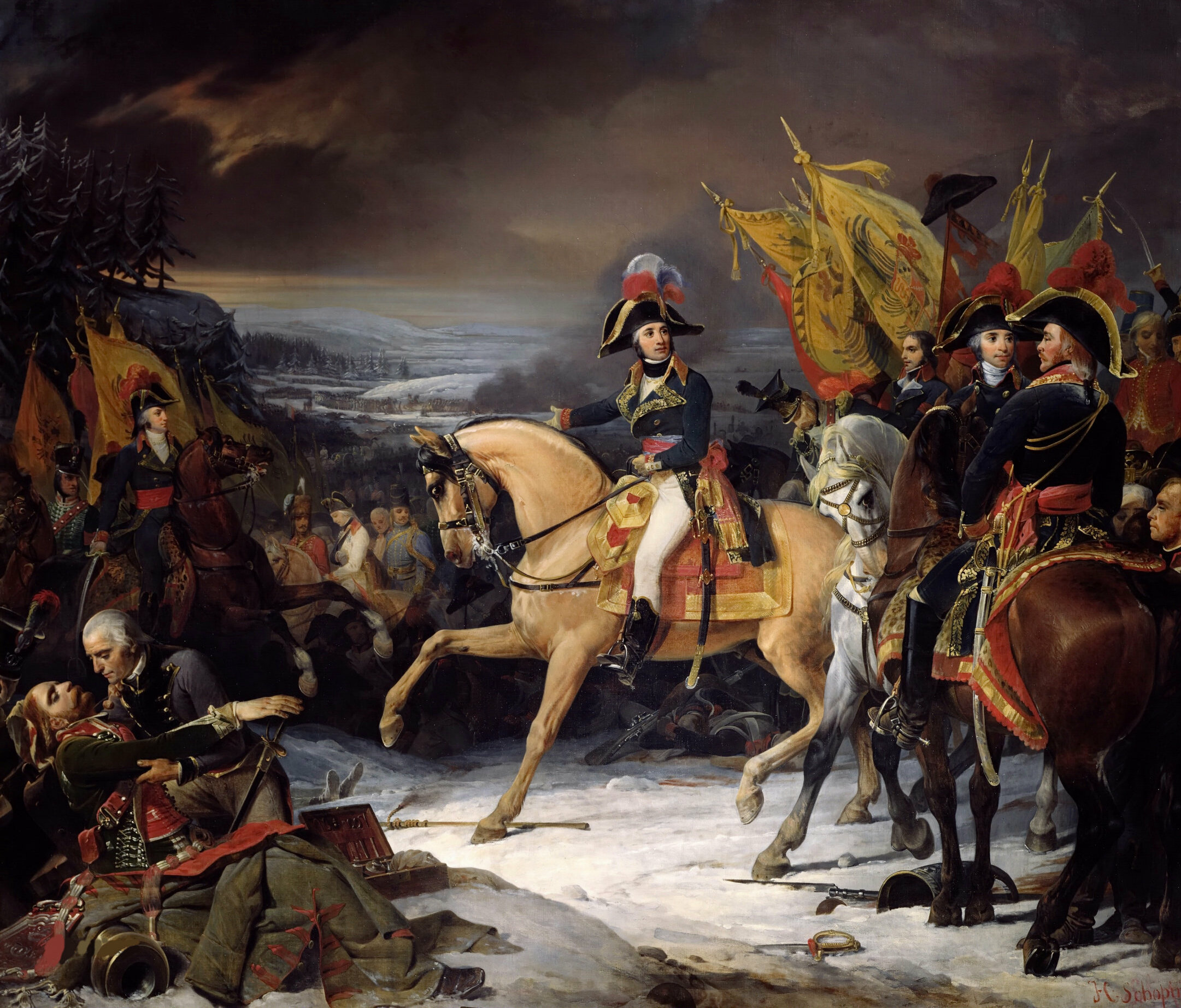
The Battle of Hohenlinden by Henri Frédéric Schopin, 1836. General Moreau at the Battle of Hohenlinden, a decisive French victory in Bavaria which precipitated the end of the Revolutionary Wars

General of Division Jean Victor Marie Moreau commanded a modestly equipped army of 137,000 French troops. Of these, 108,000 troops were available for field operations while the other 29,000 watched the Swiss border and held the Rhine fortresses. First Consul Napoleon Bonaparte offered a plan of operations based on outflanking the Austrians by a push from Switzerland, but Moreau declined to follow it. Rather, Moreau planned to cross the Rhine near Basel where the river swung to the north. A French column would distract Kray from Moreau's true intentions by crossing the Rhine from the west. Bonaparte wanted Claude Lecourbe's corps to be detached to Italy after the initial battles, but Moreau had other plans. Through a series of complicated maneuvers in which he flanked, double flanked, and reflanked Kray's army, Moreau's army lay on the eastern slope of the Black Forest, while portions of Kray's army was still guarding the passes on the other side. On 3 May 1800 Moreau and Kray fought the Battles of Engen and Stockach. The fighting near Engen resulted in a stalemate with heavy losses on both sides. However, while the two main armies were engaged at Engen, Claude Lecourbe captured Stockach from its Austrian defenders under Joseph Louis, Prince of Lorraine-Vaudémont. The loss of this main supply base at Stockach compelled Kray to order a retreat to Meßkirch, where they enjoyed a more favourable defensive position. However, it also meant that any retreat by Kray into Austria via Switzerland and the Vorarlberg was cut off.

On 4 and 5 May, the French launched repeated and fruitless assaults on the Meßkirch. At nearby Krumbach, where the Austrians also had the superiority of position and force, the 1st Demi-Brigade took the village and the heights around it, which gave them a commanding aspect over Meßkirch. Subsequently, Kray withdrew his forces to Sigmaringen, followed closely by the French. Fighting at nearby Biberach an der Ris ensued on 9 May; action principally consisted of the 25,000-man-strong French "Center", commanded by Laurent de Gouvion Saint-Cyr. After being flanked by General Moreau, who approached Ulm from the east and overwhelmed his outposts at Battle of Höchstädt, Kray retreated to Munich. Again, on 10 May, the Austrians withdrew with heavy losses, this time to Ulm.

A several month armistice followed, during which Kray was replaced by the Archduke John, with the Austrian army retiring behind the River Inn. Austrian reluctance to accept negotiated terms caused the French to end the armistice in mid-November, effective in two weeks. When the armistice ended, John advanced over the Inn towards Munich. His army was defeated in small engagements at the battles of Ampfing and Neuburg an der Donau, and decisively in the forests before the city at Hohenlinden on 3 December. Moreau began a march on Vienna, and the Austrians soon sued for peace, ending the war on the continent.

=== 1801 ===
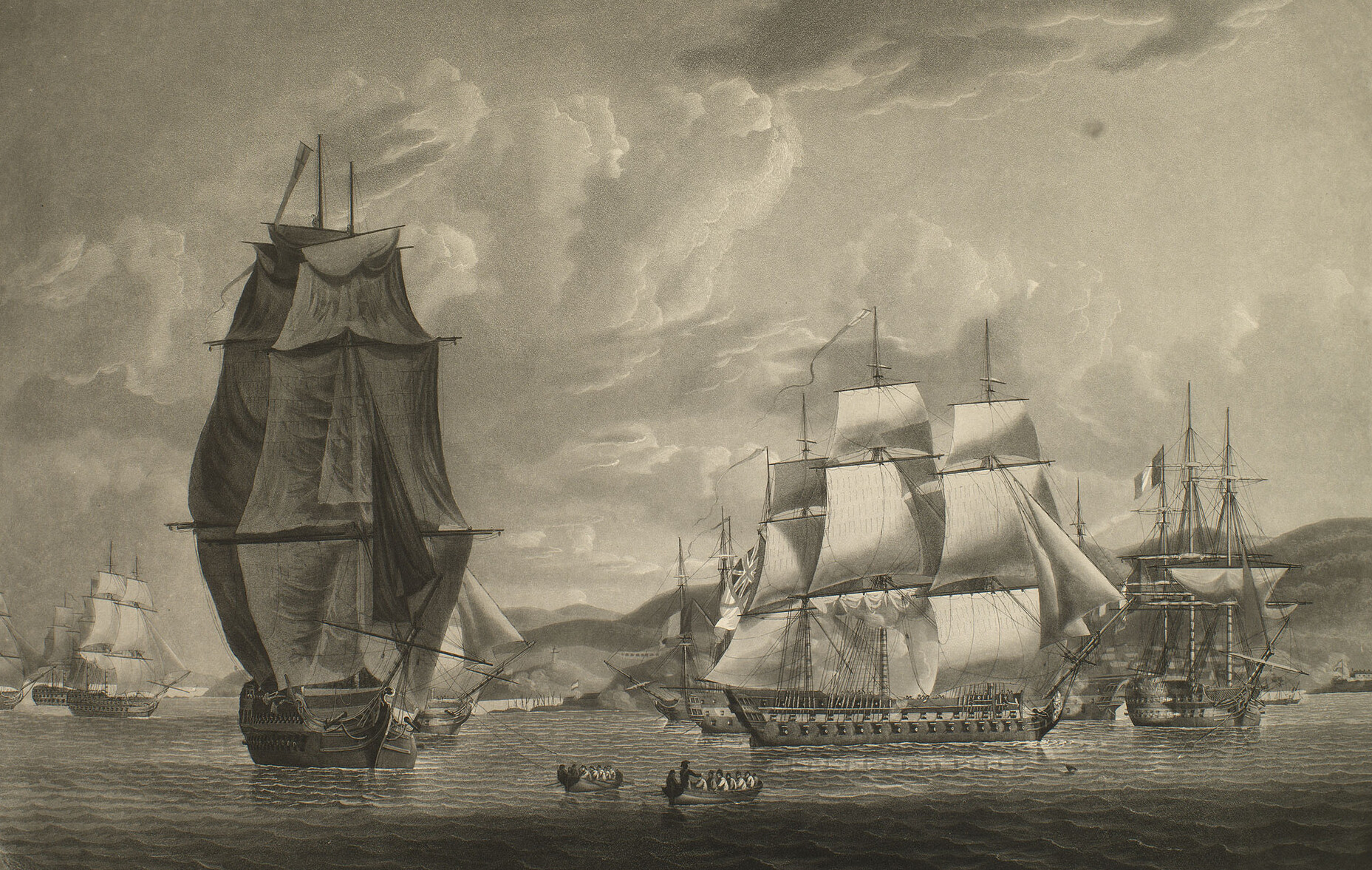
First Battle of Algeciras

By 9 February, the Austrians had signed the Treaty of Lunéville, ending the war on the continent. The war against the United Kingdom continued (with Neapolitan harbours closed to her by the Treaty of Florence, signed on 28 March), and the Turks invaded Egypt in March, losing to Kléber at Heliopolis. The exhausted French force in Egypt, however, surrendered to the British in August.

The naval war also continued, with the United Kingdom maintaining a blockade of France by sea. Russia, Prussia, Denmark-Norway, and Sweden formed the Second League of Armed Neutrality to prevent their merchant ships from being searched by the Royal Navy. British Admiral Horatio Nelson defied orders and attacked the Danish fleet in harbour at the Battle of Copenhagen, destroying much of it. An armistice prevented him from continuing into the Baltic Sea to attack the Russian fleet at Reval (Tallinn). Meanwhile, off Gibraltar, the outnumbered French squadron under Charles-Alexandre Léon Durand Linois repulsed a British attack under Saumarez in the First Battle of Algeciras. In the Second Battle of Algeciras, four days later, the British captured a French ship of the line and two Spanish ships of the line accidentally blew each other up, killing around 2,000 French and Spanish sailors for the loss of 12 Britons.

=== 1802 ===
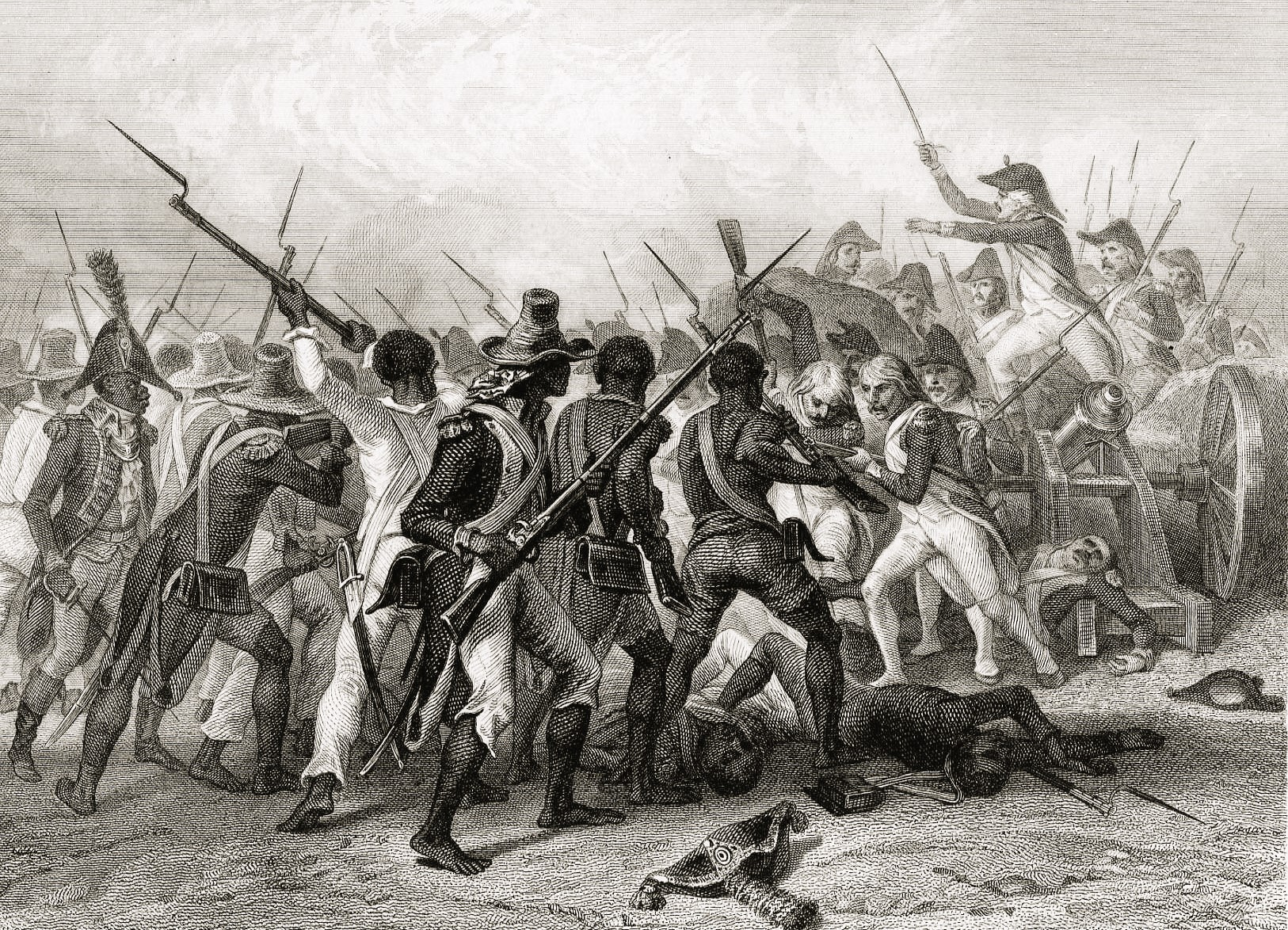
Battle between insurgent slaves and Napoleonic troops during the Saint-Domingue expedition (1802-1803), at the end of the Haitian Revolution

In 1802, the British and French signed the Treaty of Amiens, ending the war. The peace held for less than a year but still constituted the longest period of peace between the two countries during the period 1793–1815. The treaty is generally considered to be the most appropriate point to mark the transition between the French Revolutionary Wars and the Napoleonic Wars, although Napoleon was not crowned emperor until 1804.

== Influence ==
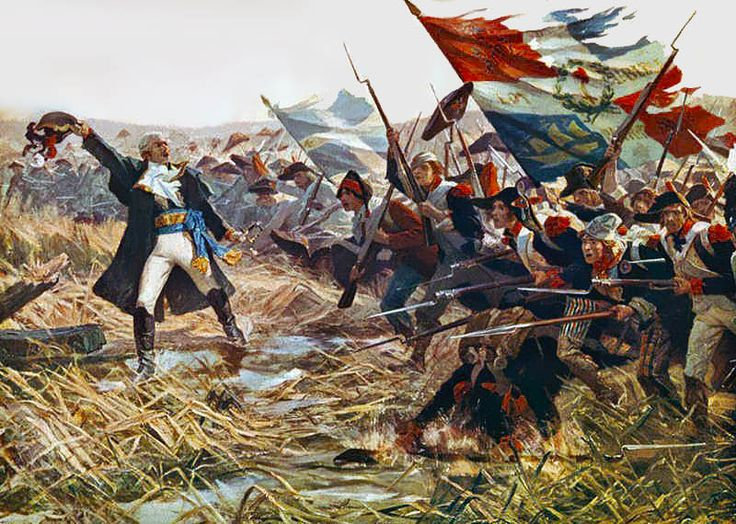
The armies of the Revolution at Jemappes in 1792. With chaos internally and enemies on the borders, the French were in a period of uncertainty during the early years of the Revolutionary Wars. By 1797, however, France dominated much of Western Europe, conquering the Rhineland, the Netherlands, and the Italian peninsula while erecting a series of sister republics and puppet states stretching from Spain to the German heartland.

The French Revolution transformed nearly all aspects of French and European life. The powerful sociopolitical forces unleashed by a people seeking liberté, égalité, and fraternité made certain that even warfare was not spared this upheaval. Eighteenth-century armies – with their rigid protocols, static operational strategy, unenthusiastic soldiers, and aristocratic officer classes – underwent massive remodeling as the French monarchy and nobility gave way to liberal assemblies obsessed with external threats. The fundamental shifts in warfare that occurred during the period have prompted scholars to identify the era as the beginning of "modern war".

In 1791 the Legislative Assembly passed the "Drill-Book" legislation, implementing a series of infantry doctrines created by French theorists because of their defeat by the Prussians in the Seven Years' War. The new developments hoped to exploit the intrinsic bravery of the French soldier, made even more powerful by the explosive nationalist forces of the Revolution. The changes also placed a faith on the ordinary soldier that would be completely unacceptable in earlier times; French troops were expected to harass the enemy and remain loyal enough to not desert, a benefit other Ancien Régime armies did not have.

Following the declaration of war in 1792, an imposing array of enemies converging on French borders prompted the government in Paris to adopt radical measures. The day 23 August 1793 would become a historic one in military history; on that date the National Convention called a levée en masse, or mass conscription, for the first time in human history. By summer of the following year, conscription made some 500,000 men available for service and the French began to deal blows to their European enemies.

Armies during the Revolution became noticeably larger than their Holy Roman counterparts, and combined with the new enthusiasm of the troops, the tactical and strategic opportunities became profound. By 1797 the French had defeated the First Coalition, occupied the Low Countries, the west bank of the Rhine, and Northern Italy, objectives which had defied the Valois and Bourbon dynasties for centuries. Unsatisfied with the results, many European powers formed a Second Coalition, but by 1801 this too had been decisively beaten. Another key aspect of French success was the changes wrought in the officer classes. Traditionally, European armies left major command positions to those who could be trusted, namely, the aristocracy. The hectic nature of the French Revolution, however, tore apart France's old army, meaning new men were required to become officers and commanders.

In addition to opening a flood of tactical and strategic opportunities, the Revolutionary Wars also laid the foundation for modern military theory. Later authors who wrote about "nations in arms" drew inspiration from the French Revolution, in which dire circumstances seemingly mobilized the entire French nation for war and incorporated nationalism into the fabric of military history. Although the reality of war in the France of 1795 would be different from that in the France of 1915, conceptions and mentalities of war evolved significantly. Clausewitz correctly analyzed the Revolutionary and Napoleonic eras to give posterity a thorough and complete theory of war that emphasized struggles between nations occurring everywhere, from the battlefield to the legislative assemblies, and to the very way that people think. War now emerged as a vast panorama of physical and psychological forces heading for victory or defeat.

== See also ==
- International relations (1648–1814)
- Lists of battles of the French Revolutionary Wars and Napoleonic Wars
- Military career of Napoleon
- Military history of France
- Fortifications of Larrun
