= Pajou =

Pajou is a surname. Notable people with the surname include:

- Augustin Pajou (1730–1809), French sculptor
- Jacques-Augustin-Catherine Pajou (1766–1828), French painter
