= Charles Antoine Morand =

French army general (1771–1835)

Charles Antoine Morand Comte de l'Empire
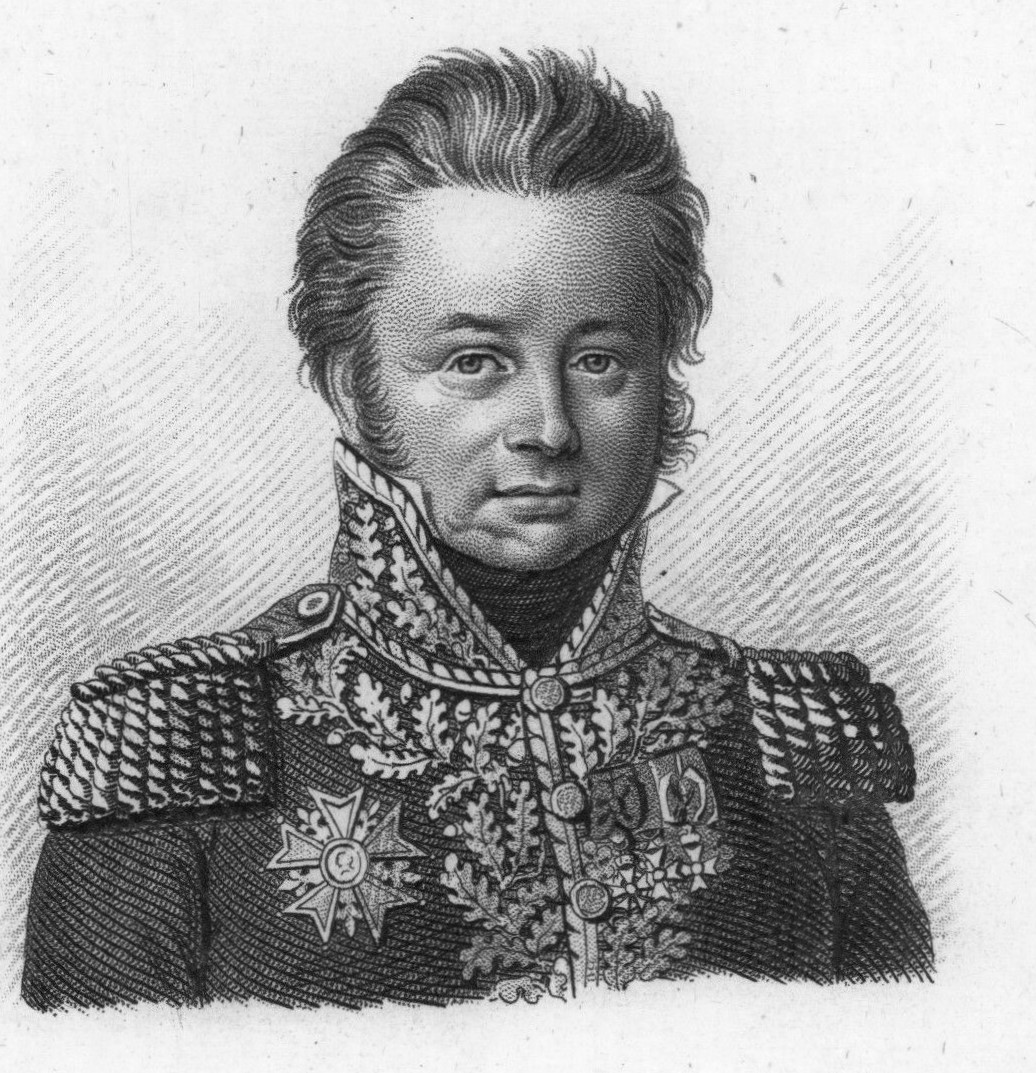
- Born: 4 June 1771; Pontarlier, Doubs
- Died: 2 December 1835 (aged 64) Paris
- Buried: Montbenoît, Doubs
- Allegiance: France
- Branch: Infantry
- Service years: 1792–1815
- Rank: General of Division
- Conflicts: French Revolutionary Wars; Napoleonic Wars
- Awards: Grand Commander of the Legion of Honour; Grand Cross of the Order of the Reunion; Commander of the Military Order of St. Henry; Knight of St. Louis; Peer of France

Charles-Antoine-Louis-Alexis Morand (French pronunciation: [ʃaʁl ɑ̃twan lwi alɛksi mɔʁɑ̃]; 4 June 1771 – 2 December 1835) Comte de l'Empire, was a general of the French army during the French Revolutionary Wars and Napoleonic Wars. He fought at many of the most important battles of the time, including Austerlitz, Borodino and Waterloo.

== Early career and French Revolutionary Wars ==
Morand was born in Pontarlier, Doubs, on 4 June 1771 the son of lawyer Alexis François Morand (1747–1829). He trained to join his father's law practice, qualifying as a lawyer at the Ecole de Droit in Besançon in 1791. However, inspired by the National Convention's call to arms, he volunteered for the army, joining the Doubs volunteers on 9 August 1792.

Elected as captain by his comrades, by the time his battalion reached the Army of the Rhine on 5 September 1792 Morand was in command with a rank of lieutenant colonel. The following year they were transferred to the Army of the North, where Morand distinguished himself at Hondschoote and Wattignies. After fighting at Fleurus, they were moved again to Bernadotte's 10th division of Jourdan's Army of the Sambre and Meuse. On 18 September 1794 his battalion lead the assault to cross the Ourthe at Aywaille in one of the finest regimental actions of the campaign. He was also conspicuous at the battle of Aldenhoven on 2 October.

On 29 December 1794, Morand's battalion was merged into the 112th Demi-Brigade (later the 88th Line), with him taking command of the 1st battalion. In this role, he took part in Jourdan and Moreau's campaigns against Archduke Charles, fighting at Koenigstein, Deining and Neumarkt. He was severely injured in the thigh at Sprimont and had to be hospitalised.

After leaving hospital, Morand remained with Bernadotte's division when it left to join the Army of Italy in January 1797. He was present at the crossing of the Tagliamento on 16 March 1797 and at the capture of Gradisca three days later. After taking part in Berthier's capture of Rome on 11 February 1798, his battalion remained there before being chosen to take part in the French invasion of Egypt in April 1798.

In Egypt, Morand fought under the command of Desaix. He was promoted to chef de brigade on the battlefield of the battle of the Pyramids on 21 July 1798. He remained with Desaix on the latter's expedition to Upper Egypt, and was placed in command of the garrison of Girgeh whilst Desaix headed further south. He repulsed a Mamluk attack on this town on 6 April 1799, and that August defeated Murad Bey at the battles of El Ganaim and Samannud. He was appointed adjutant général chef de brigade and governor of the province of Girgeh on 7 September 1799. Promoted to Général de Brigade on 6 September 1800, by May 1801 he joined Verdier's division to form the garrison of Cairo against the advancing Anglo-Turkish forces. A struggle for the city was avoided when, along with General Belliard, he signed a surrender agreement that would evacuate the remaining French troops. He himself left Egypt on 9 August 1801 and arrived in Marseille on 14 September. His letters and other writings during this period were later published.

== Napoleonic Wars ==
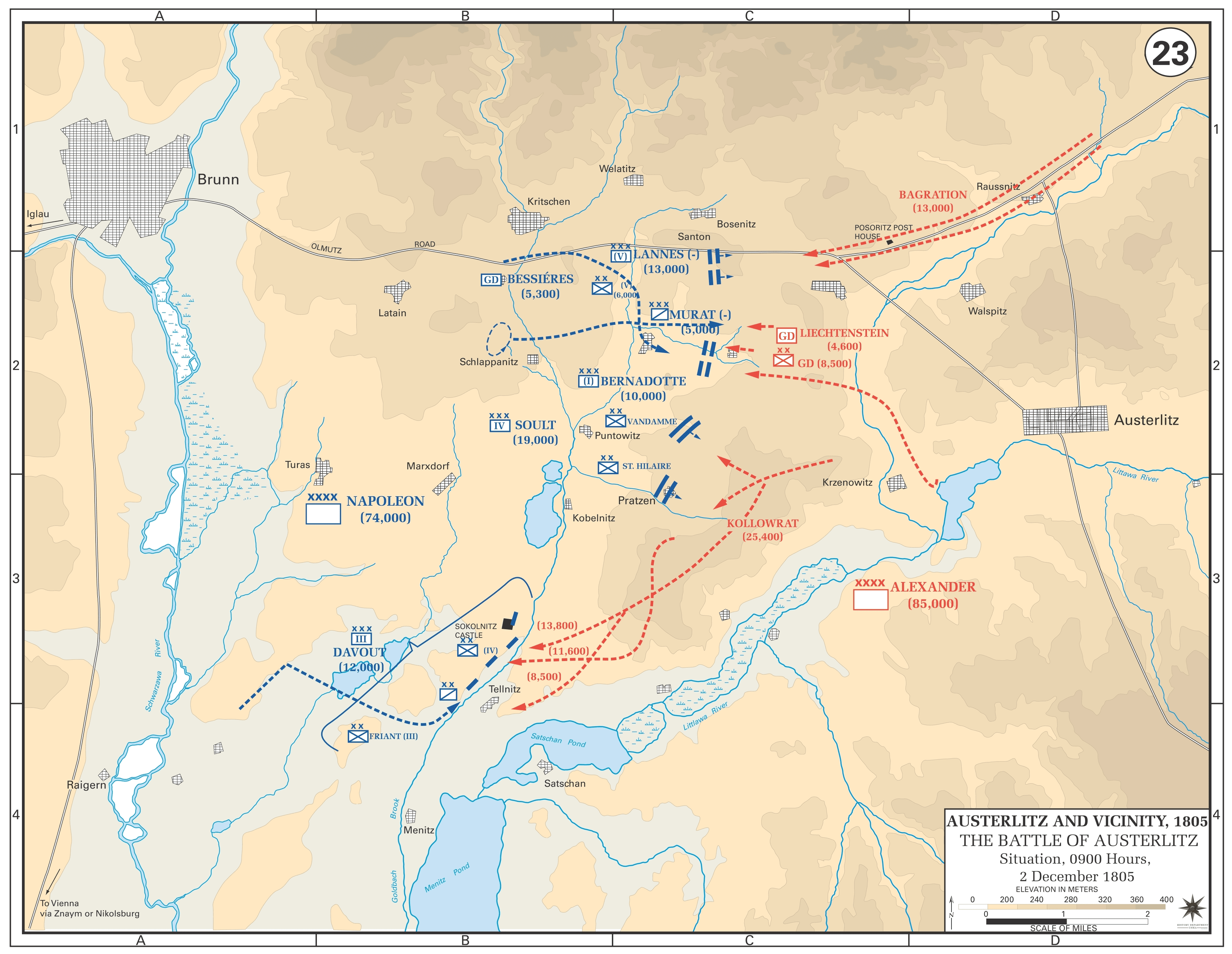
IV Corp's decisive attack on the Allied center in the battle of Austerlitz was led by Morand's brigade.

Back in France, after some leave, Morand was made commandant of the Department of Morbihan on 19 March 1802 before being called to Marshal Soult's camp at Saint-Omer on 30 October 1803. He was made an Officer of the Legion of Honour on 11 December 1803, and a Commander on 14 June 1804. When the Grande Armée marched for Austria in August 1805, he commanded the first brigade in Saint-Hilaire's first division of Soult's IV Corps. He was present at the battle of Donauwörth and the remainder of the Ulm campaign, culminating in the capitulation of General Mack.

At the Battle of Austerlitz on 2 December 1805, Morand's brigade led the way in Soult's decisive advance onto the Pratzen Heights. Wounded by a shot during the battle, Morand was rewarded for the part he played in the victory by promotion to Général de Division on 24 December 1805, and also made governor of Vienna.

On 14 February 1806, Morand replaced Caffarelli as commander of the 1st Division of Davout's III Corps. Davout knew Morand from their days in Egypt and was pleased with the appointment; they would serve together until 1813.

Morand's first campaign with III Corps was against Prussia in 1806. His division played a vital part in the battle of Auerstedt, where Davout's lone corps defeated a Prussian army more than twice their size. During the battle, Morand was wounded in the arm by a canister shot. Continuing to campaign into Poland, he fought at the capture of Custrin, the crossing of the Bug, and the battles of Czarnowo and Golymin, before being wounded again at Eylau.

On 7 July 1807 Morand was named a Grand Officer of the Legion of Honour. After the Treaty of Tilsit, his division formed the garrison of Warsaw. There, at a ball organised by Frederick Augustus, Duke of Warsaw in December 1807, he met Emilia, the sixteen-year-old daughter of Count Parys, a Polish aristocrat and colonel in the Saxon army. Morand was smitten, and proposed soon afterwards. The couple were married in a civil service on 10 January 1810, with Davout and Savary as witnesses, and in a religious service four days later at the Church of the Holy Cross in the presence of Prince Poniatowski. Napoleon sent the newlyweds a gift of jewellery and 30,000 gold francs. On 24 June 1808, Morand was named a Comte de l'Empire.

In the summer of 1808, as relations with Austria deteriorated, III Corps was redeployed to Franconia to watch the border, Morand being stationed in Neumarkt. When the War of the Fifth Coalition broke out in April 1809, his division was temporarily transferred to Marshal Lannes, fighting at Abensberg, Landshut, and Eckmühl on 20–22 April. Back with the III Corps, he fought at Wagram, where he was wounded.

In July 1810, Morand was stationed in Hamburg and appointed governor general of the Hanseatic cities. By this time his relationship with Davout had soured, as Morand believed his chief had blocked his chances of promotion in order to retain his services. Matters came to a head in November 1810 when, by accident or design, Morand wrote directly to Minister of War Clarke instead of corresponding via Davout. Davout delivered a sharp rebuke in response, and Morand wrote again to Clarke threatening to resign if he was not transferred to a different commander. Napoleon refused to allow such a transfer and settled the affair, but the two men were never again on good terms.

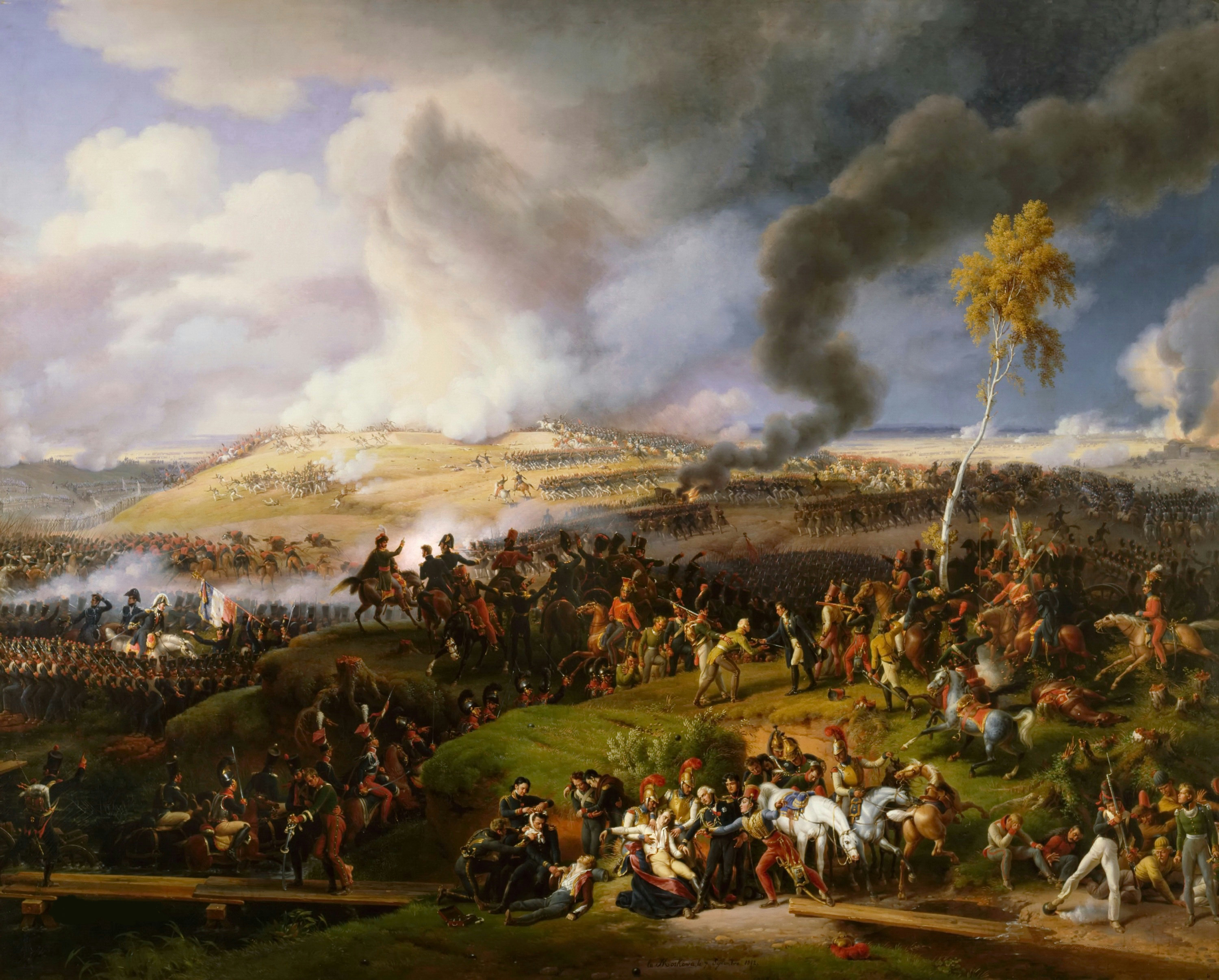
The Battle of Moscow, 1822 by Louis-François Lejeune. Morand appears in the bottom center of the painting, having his wounded jaw bandaged whilst his brother Leopold (a battalion commander in the 17th Line) dies at his feet.

They had to put aside their differences during the French invasion of Russia, when Morand's division formed part of Davout's renumbered I Corps. Crossing the Niemen on 24 June 1812, he fought at Smolensk and had his jaw smashed by a shell splinter at the Battle of Borodino. He continued to lead his division in the retreat from Moscow, being one of the last formations to leave the city. Fighting at Vyazma and Krasnoi, by the time he reached the Niemen he had just 300 left of the original 10,000 men under his command.

For the German Campaign of 1813, Morand was given command of a new division in Bertrand's IV Corps. On 3 April 1813, he was awarded the Grand Cross of the Order of the Reunion and made a Commander of the Saxon Military Order of St. Henry. He fought at Lutzen, Bautzen, Dennewitz, Wartenburg, Hanau, and Hochheim as the Allies defeated Napoleon. He took over command of the IV Corps on 13 November 1813 and led the defence of Mainz from December 1813 to April 1814, retiring to Fontainebleau when Napoleon abdicated.

Morand was reconciled to the Bourbons during the first Restoration, and was made a Knight of St. Louis by King Louis XVIII. However, when Napoleon returned during The Hundred Days, Morand rallied to his cause. He was made colonel of the Chasseurs of the Imperial Guard on 13 April 1815, and a Peer of France on 2 June. During the Waterloo campaign, he led the guard Chasseur division and was heavily engaged in the struggle for Plancenoit during the battle of Waterloo.

== Post war career ==
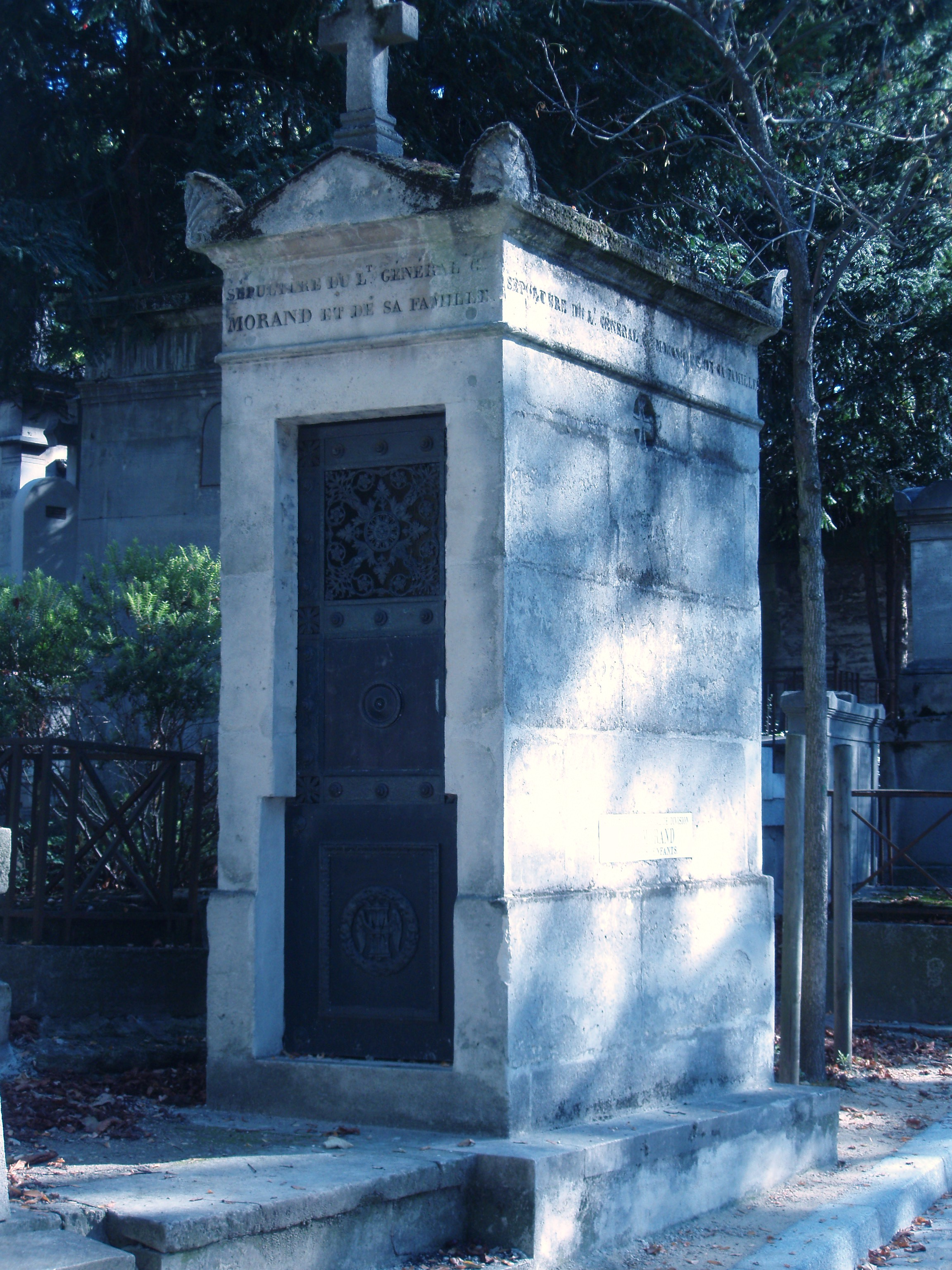
The (now empty) tomb of General Morand at Père Lachaise Cemetery

Morand was placed on the non active list on 1 August, then suspended without pay or pension on 23 December 1815 and ordered to leave France. He passed through Vienna, where he was received kindly by Emperor Francis who remembered his moderation whilst governor of Vienna in 1805. Tsar Alexander I offered him a post in the Russian army, but instead he chose a quiet exile in Kawenczyn near Kraków. On 29 August 1816 he was convicted in absentia of plotting to overthrow the King during Napoleon's march on Paris and sentenced to death. With the help of Gouvion Saint Cyr, this sentence was overturned on 14 June 1819, and his rank and privileges were restored on 20 September 1820. He returned from exile but never held a command under the Bourbons, retiring on 17 March 1825. He went to live in Montbenoît, where he wrote a book of military theory based on the experiences of the recent wars.

Morand's fortunes improved following the July Revolution, and he was recalled to the colours as commander of the 6th Military Division at Besançon on 4 August 1830. He was made a Grand Commander of the Legion of Honour on 13 October 1830, and a Peer of France on 11 October 1832. He died of a stroke in Paris on 2 September 1835, and was buried at Père Lachaise Cemetery. His name was inscribed on the east side of the Arc de Triomphe.

In 1885, his remains were transferred to a mausoleum in Haut-Doubs, close to the Morand family home and to Montbenoît Abbey.

== Family ==
Charles and Emilie (who died on 11 November 1868 in Paris) had the following children:

- Louise (1809–1862)
- Napoléon (1811–1852)
- Emilie (1812–?)
- Louis Charles Alphonse (1813–1905)
- Emile (1817–1828)
- Amédée (1819–1855)
- Euphroisine (1821–1828)
- Jeanne Estelle (1824–1837)
- Louis Charles Auguste (1826–1870), Général de brigade, ADC to Napoleon III, mortally wounded at the Battle of Beaumont
- Paul Louis Marie (1828–1897)
