= Compagnie des arts de Paris =

The Compagnie des arts de Paris was a military unit of the French Revolutionary Wars. It was formed on 6 September 1792 in the Louvre section and was made up of students of Letters and Sciences, particularly from the école de Droit and écoles des Beaux-Arts. Members included students from the studio of Jacques-Louis David and other artists. The company paraded before the Legislative Assembly on 8 September 1792 and made an oath "to maintain and to defend Liberty and Equality or to die in the attempt". The company was incorporated on 23 September 1792 into the Bataillon 9 bis, then at Châlons-en-Champagne and known as the Bataillon de l'arsenal or Arsenal battalion. It was disbanded at the end of February 1793.

Its volunteers included its captain Jacques Lemercier (sculptor), sous-lieutenant Jean-Baptiste Francesqui (sculptor known as Fransechi-Delorme), sous-officier Louis-François Lejeune (painter), private Jacques-Augustin-Catherine Pajou (painter) and the future economist Jean-Baptiste Say.
