= Attack on a Large Convoy at Salinas =

1819 painting by Louis-François Lejeune

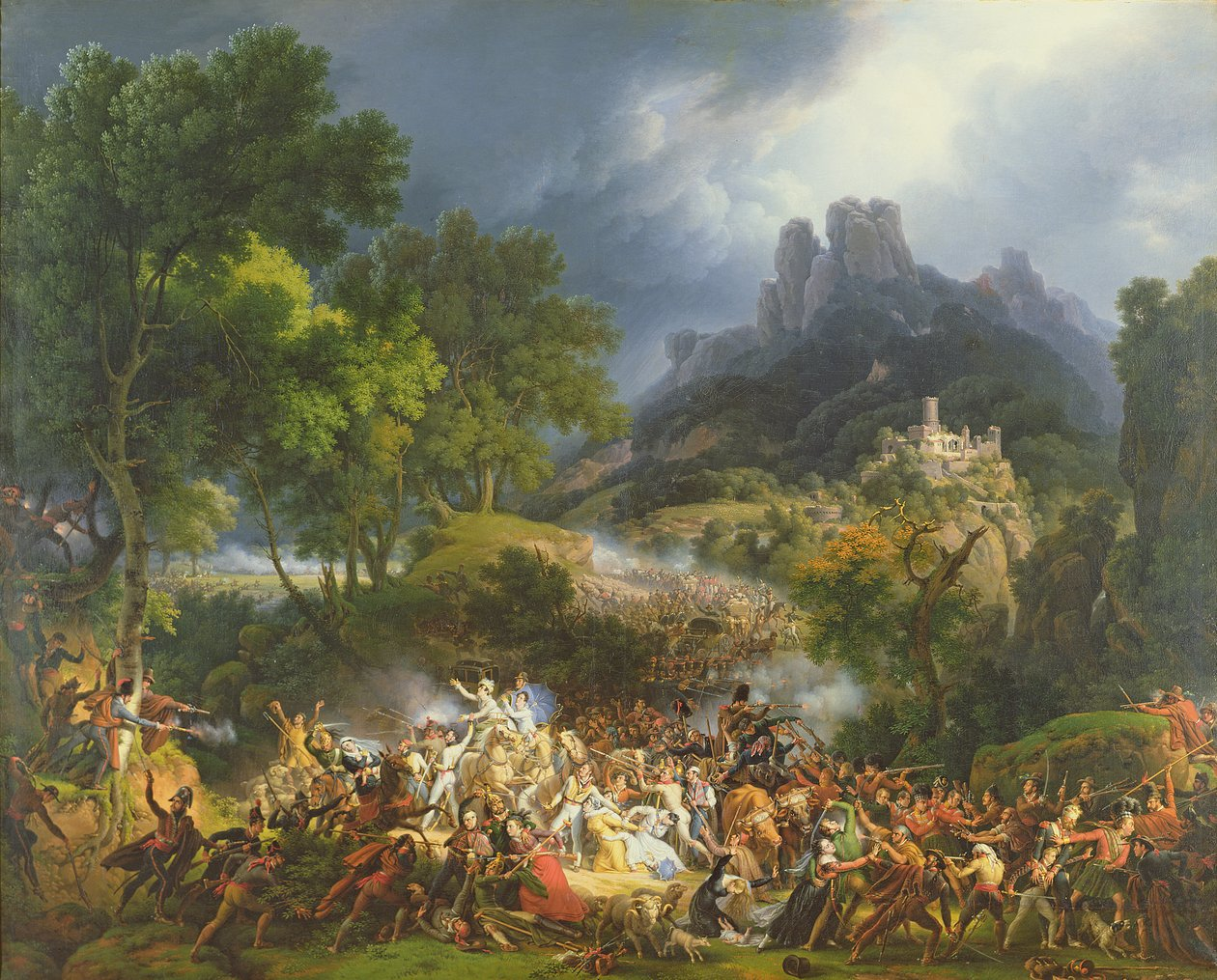
- Artist: Louis-François Lejeune
- Year: 1819
- Type: Oil on canvas, history painting
- Dimensions: 465 cm × 543 cm (183 in × 214 in)
- Location: Palace of Versailles, Versailles

Attaque d'un grand convoi à Salinas, Biscaye, 25 mai 1812 (French for 'Attack on a large convoy at Salinas, Biscay, 25 May 1812') is an oil on canvas history painting by the French artist Louis-François Lejeune, from 1819.

== History and description ==
It depicts a scene from the Peninsular War on 25 May 1812 when a French convoy was attacked near Salinas by Spanish guerrilleros. Those in the convoy (including the court of Joseph Bonaparte, Spanish allies of the French and British prisoners of war) joined forces to fight off the attackers.

It was exhibited at the Salon of 1819 at the Louvre. Today it is in the collection of the Palace of Versailles, having been acquired in 1861.
