= Jacques-Augustin-Catherine Pajou =

French painter (1766–1828)

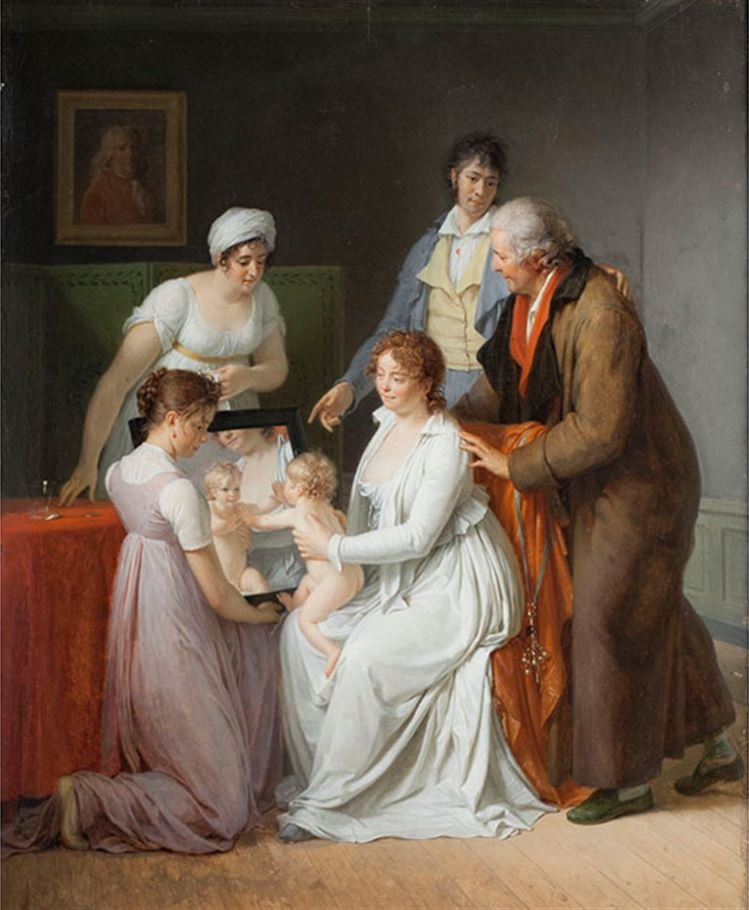
Portrait of the Artist and His Family (1802)

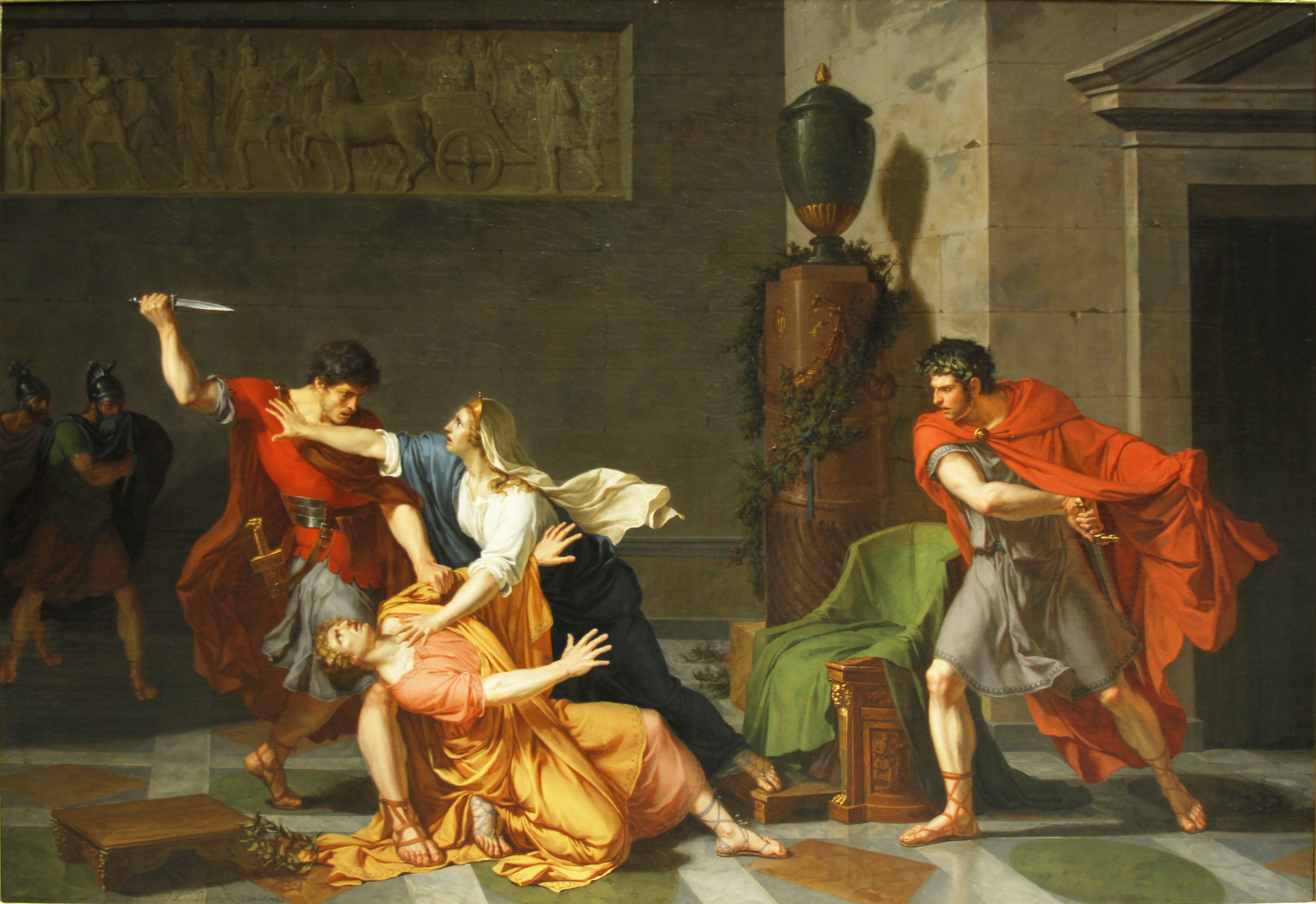
The Emperor Geta, Dying in His Mother's Arms

Jacques-Augustin-Catherine Pajou (27 August 1766 – 28 November 1828) was a French painter in the Classical style.

== Biography ==
He was born in Paris. His father was the sculptor, Augustin Pajou. Nothing is known of his childhood. In 1784, at the age of eighteen, he became a student at the Académie royale de peinture et de sculpture. Four attempts to win the Prix de Rome were unsuccessful.

In 1792, he became a member of the Compagnie des arts de Paris, organized by the Louvre, alongside the painter Louis-François Lejeune as well as the future economist, Jean-Baptiste Say. While stationed with the regular army in Sedan, he wrote numerous letters to his friend, François Gérard. which express his initial enthusiasm, but gradually turn to boredom, disillusionment and physical exhaustion.

After being demobilized, he participated in creating the "Commune générale des arts", an institution designed to replace the Académie Royale. He served as Secretary for the Commune's President, Joseph-Marie Vien. In 1795, he married Marie-Marguerite Thibault (1764–1827). Under the First Empire, he was commissioned to paint a portrait of Maréchal Louis-Alexandre Berthier, which may still be seen at Versailles. In 1812, he was awarded a gold medal for his depiction of Napoleon offering clemency to the Royalists who had taken refuge in Spain.

In 1811, at the urging of François-Guillaume Ménageot, who had become apprised of the precarious financial situation facing the sculptor David d'Angers, Pajou wrote a letter to the mayor of Angers, demanding that material aid be given to the sculptor. The aid was granted and was considered a lifesaver for d'Angers, who went on to win the Prix de Rome for sculpture and spend several years at the French Academy in Rome. In 1814, he painted three tableaux celebrating the Bourbon Restoration. They were displayed at the Salon and it is possible they were seen by Napoleon.

He resigned from most of the associations of which he was a member in 1823, citing poor health. In a letter from that period, he says that he was "cruelly tormented for a year by a continual tremor." He died in Paris in 1828 and was interred at the Cimetière du Père-Lachaise.

His son, Augustin-Désiré Pajou also became a well-known painter.

== Sources ==
- Baron Gérard, Lettres autographes adressées au baron François Gérard publiées par le baron Gérard, son neveu, Paris, 1883
- Philippe Nusbaumer, Jacques-Augustin-Catherine Pajou, peintre d'histoire et de portraits, Le Pecq-sur-Seine, 1997 ISBN 978-2-951186-00-2
- Philippe Nusbaumer, "Le Peintre Jacques Pajou, fils du sculpteur. De la difficulté de se faire un prénom", in: Augustin Pajou et ses contemporains, La Documentation française, 1999 ISBN 978-2-11-004393-1
