= Battle of Mount Tabor (1799) =

1799 battle of the French invasion of Egypt and Syria

- Part of the French invasion of Egypt and Syria
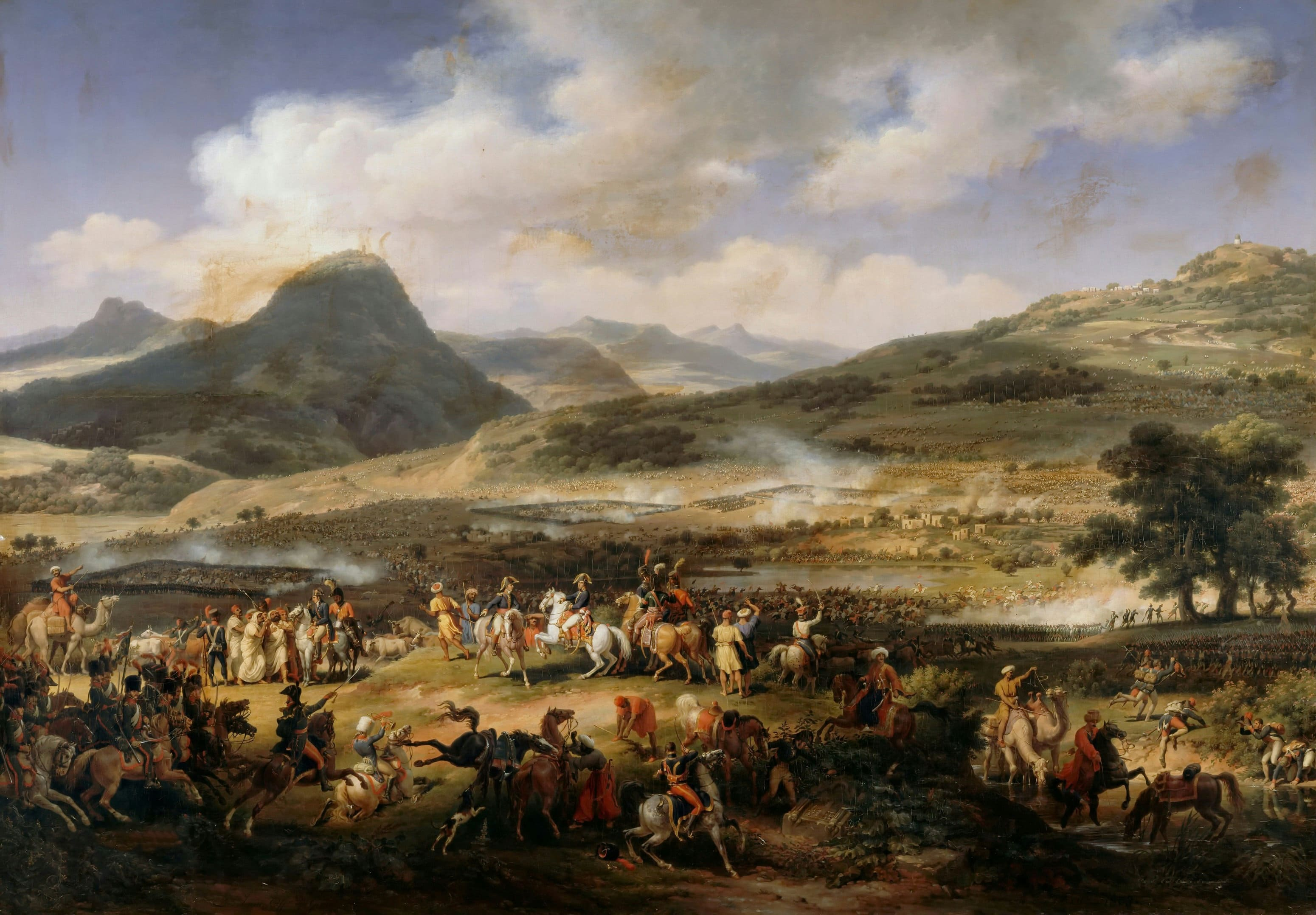
- The Battle of Mount Tabor (1808)
| Date | 16 April 1799 |
| Location | Al-Fuleh, Ottoman Syria 32°36′45″N 35°19′36″E |
| Result | French victory |

Belligerents
| France | Ottoman Empire |

Commanders and leaders
| Napoleon; Jean-Baptiste Kléber | Abdullah Pasha al-Azm |

Strength
| 4,000 | 35,000 (Western claim) |

Casualties and losses
| 2 killed 60 wounded | 6,000 killed or wounded 500 captured (Western sources only) |

War of the Second Coalition:
Egypt and Syria
current battle
Napoleon in command till 23 August 1799

The Battle of Mount Tabor was fought on 16 April 1799 between French forces commanded by Napoleon Bonaparte and Jean-Baptiste Kléber against an Ottoman army under Abdullah Pasha al-Azm, the pasha of Damascus. The battle took place during the siege of Acre of French invasion of Egypt and Syria.

Upon hearing that an Ottoman army had been sent from Damascus to Acre for the purpose of forcing the French to raise the siege, Bonaparte sent out detachments to track it down. Kléber led his division of 2,000 men and decided to engage the Ottoman army near Mount Tabor, managing to hold it off until Bonaparte led 2,000 reinforcements and engaged in a circling manoeuvre which took the Ottomans completely by surprise in their rear.

The resulting battle saw the French force inflict many casualties and scatter the remaining forces of al-Azm, forcing them to abandon their hopes of reconquering Egypt and leaving Bonaparte free to carry on the siege of Acre.

== Background ==
By April, during the siege of Acre, Napoleon had become concerned about his strategic situation and the possible presence of large Ottoman forces in the vicinity. This resulted in more supervision of his subordinates and detailed instructions, which Kléber chafed at. While in Nazareth, Kléber received news that a large Ottoman force was encamped near Mount Tabor, and saw a chance to make a name for himself. After taking the precaution to write to Napoleon of his intentions (but too late for Napoleon to respond), Kléber took his division of 2,000 men in the hopes of launching a daring night raid on the Ottoman camp. His plan was to march around the northern side of Mount Tabor to surprise the Ottoman forces at 2 am.

== Battle ==
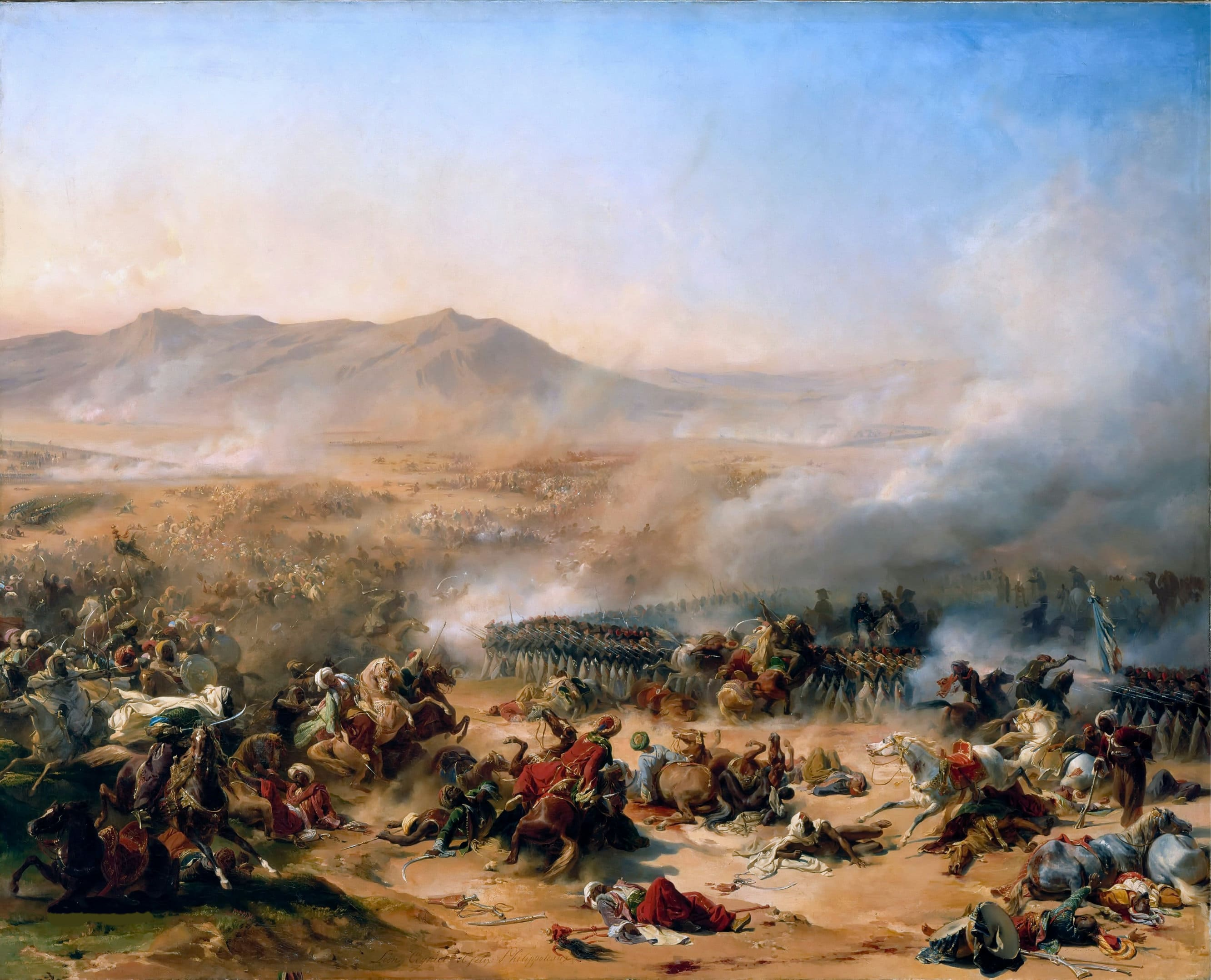
c. 1838 painting of the battle by Léon Cogniet

Kléber had badly estimated how long the march would take and did not reach the plain below Mount Tabor until 6 am, by which time the sun had risen. The Ottoman forces spotted Kléber, who realized that his best bet was to form two infantry squares to defend against attack, then hopefully retreat during the night. However, as the day wore on, it became clear to both Kléber and the Ottomans that his position could not last, as Kléber's men were running out of ammunition, thirsty and starving.

Just when all seemed to be lost, some of his soldiers claimed to have seen bayonets advancing from the north. Kléber tried to verify their report by climbing to a vantage point and using his telescope but saw nothing. Desperate, Kléber prepared to abandon his artillery and wounded, and attempt a breakout, every man for himself. However, Kléber's men had not been mistaken: Napoleon was marching to their aid with 2,000 men. When Kléber had looked, Napoleon's forces had marched behind head-high wild wheat, which made them invisible from the battlefield.

Napoleon found himself between the Ottomans and their camp. He ordered a part of his force to form squares and march upon an embankment, which made them visible to both the Ottomans and the French troops under Kléber, coordinated with a salvo from his artillery to announce his presence. The Ottoman forces were briefly distracted by this but were soon reassured by the sight of their advancing Mamluk cavalry and Nablus tribesmen. Seeing that the Ottomans would stand their ground, Napoleon sent three of his squares to march out, in between the Ottomans and their camp. Simultaneously, he sent 300 men into the camp, with orders to set fire to all the tents and make a show of seizing supplies and camels. Upon seeing the destruction of their belongings and Napoleon's squares blocking the way to save their camp, the Ottomans felt cut off and were thrown into confusion.

Kléber saw his chance, and ordered his men to charge, which supported by the soldiers under Napoleon transformed the Ottoman retreat into a general rout. Ottoman cavalry headed for the mountains in the south, while their infantry scattered toward the Jordan River. Recent rains had risen the water of the river and made its banks into a quagmire, and this poor timing resulted in thousands of casualties for the retreating Ottoman infantry.

== Aftermath ==
French casualties were two dead and sixteen wounded, but had Napoleon arrived just an hour later, casualties would have been far more serious. Although the Ottomans fled before really significant losses could be inflicted, it was estimated that 6,000 of the army of Damascus perished. With the threat of a relief army eliminated, Napoleon led his troops back to Acre to continue the siege. A month later when more men became sick with the plague he decided to abandon Acre and retreat back to Egypt.

== Sources ==
- Bodart, Gaston (1908). Militär-historisches Kriegs-Lexikon (1618-1905) (in German).
- Chandler, David (1995). The Campaigns of Napoleon. New York: Simon & Schuster. ISBN 0-02-523660-1.
- Strathern, P. (2008). Napoleon in Egypt. Vintage. ISBN 978-1-84413-917-0.
- Ryan, E. (2003). Napoleon's Shield & Guardian: The Unconquerable General Daumesnil. Pen & Sword Books Limited. ISBN 978-1-78438-013-7.
- River (2018). Napoleon in Egypt: The History and Legacy of the French Campaign in Egypt and Syria. Charles River Editors. ISBN 978-1718863620.
- Laurens, H. (1996). L'Expédition d'Egypte (in French). Éditions du Seuil. ISBN 978-2-75-784631-5.
