= Battle of Aboukir (Lejeune) =

1804 painting by Louis-François Lejeune

Battle of Aboukir, 27 July 1799
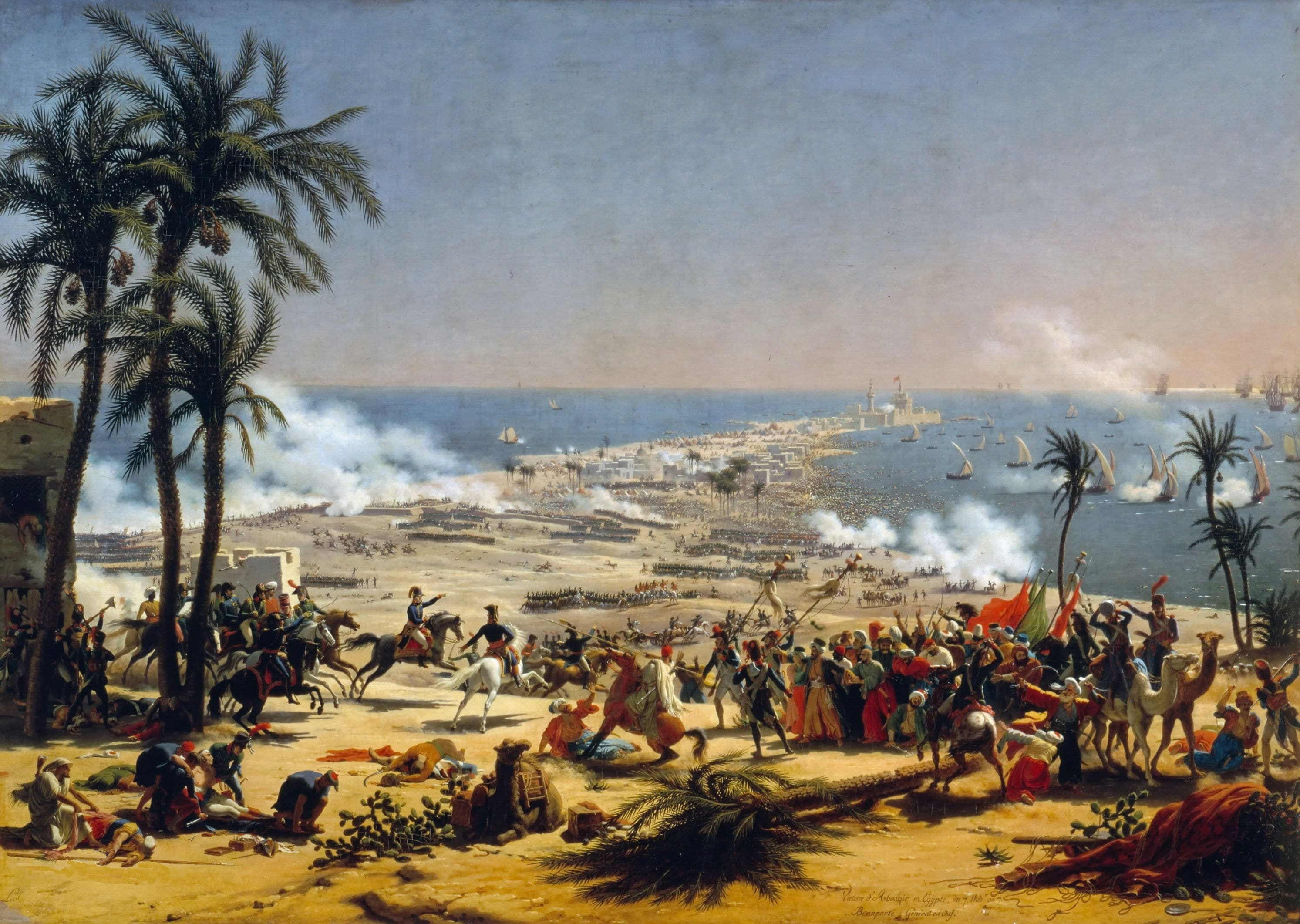
- Artist: Louis-François Lejeune
- Year: 1804
- Medium: Oil on canvas
- Dimensions: 185 cm × 255 cm (73 in × 100 in)
- Location: Palace of Versailles, Versailles

Battle of Aboukir, 27 July 1799 (French: Bataille d'Aboukir, 27 juillet 1799) is an 1804 history painting by the French artist Louis-François Lejeune. It depicts the Battle of Abukir fought on 25 July 1799 during the French invasion of Egypt. General Napoleon Bonaparte French troops defeated a force from the Ottoman Empire outside Abu Qir on the Mediterranean coast of Egypt.

It was one of three paintings Lejeune exhibited at the Salon of 1804 at the Louvre in Paris, along with his The Battle of Lodi. As of 2025, it is in the collection of the Musée de l'Histoire de France at the Palace of Versailles. The 1806 painting The Battle of Aboukir by Antoine-Jean Gros is also in the collection at Versailles.
