= The Battle of Moscow (painting) =

1822 painting by Louis-François Lejeune

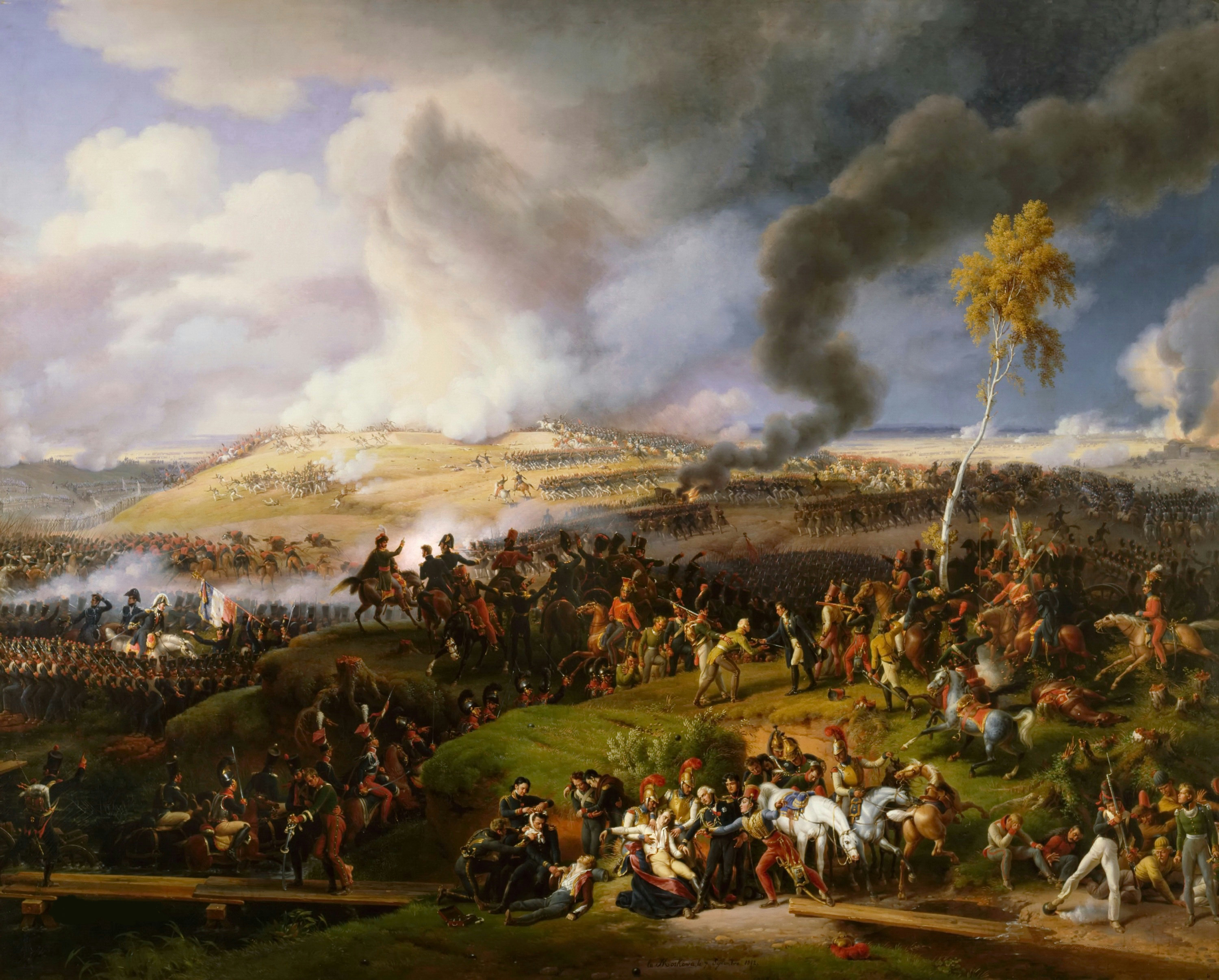
- Artist: Louis-François Lejeune
- Year: 1822
- Medium: Oil on canvas
- Dimensions: 210 cm × 264 cm (83 in × 104 in)
- Location: Palace of Versailles, Versailles

The Battle of Moscow (French: Bataille de la Moskova) is an oil on canvas history painting by the French artist Louis-François Lejeune, from 1822.

== History and description ==
It depicts a panoramic view the Battle of Borodino fought on 7 September 1812 outside Moscow and near the Moskva River, during the French invasion of Russia. The fighting resulted in a French victory, allowing them to enter the city a few days later.

The painting captures the moment the final assault was made on the Great Redoubt. In the foreground are several wounded or dying generals. Lejeune had himself served in the campaign, and the painting features a self-portrait. As well as Napoleon, other notable figures are Auguste-Jean-Gabriel de Caulaincourt, Louis-Alexandre Berthier, Charles Antoine Morand and Étienne Maurice Gérard. Lejeune had been a well-known painter of large battle scenes since the Salon of 1801. The painting was displayed at the Salon of 1824 at the Louvre in Paris. It was acquired for the Musée de l'Histoire de France at the Palace of Versailles in 1861.

== See also ==
- The Battle of Borodino, an 1829 painting by George Jones

== Bibliography ==
- Austin, Paul Britten (2019). 1812: Napoleon in Moscow. Frontline Books.
- Hornstein, Katie (2018). Picturing War in France, 1792–1856. Yale University Press. ISBN 9780300230161.
