= The Battle of Mount Tabor =

1808 painting by Louis-François Lejeune

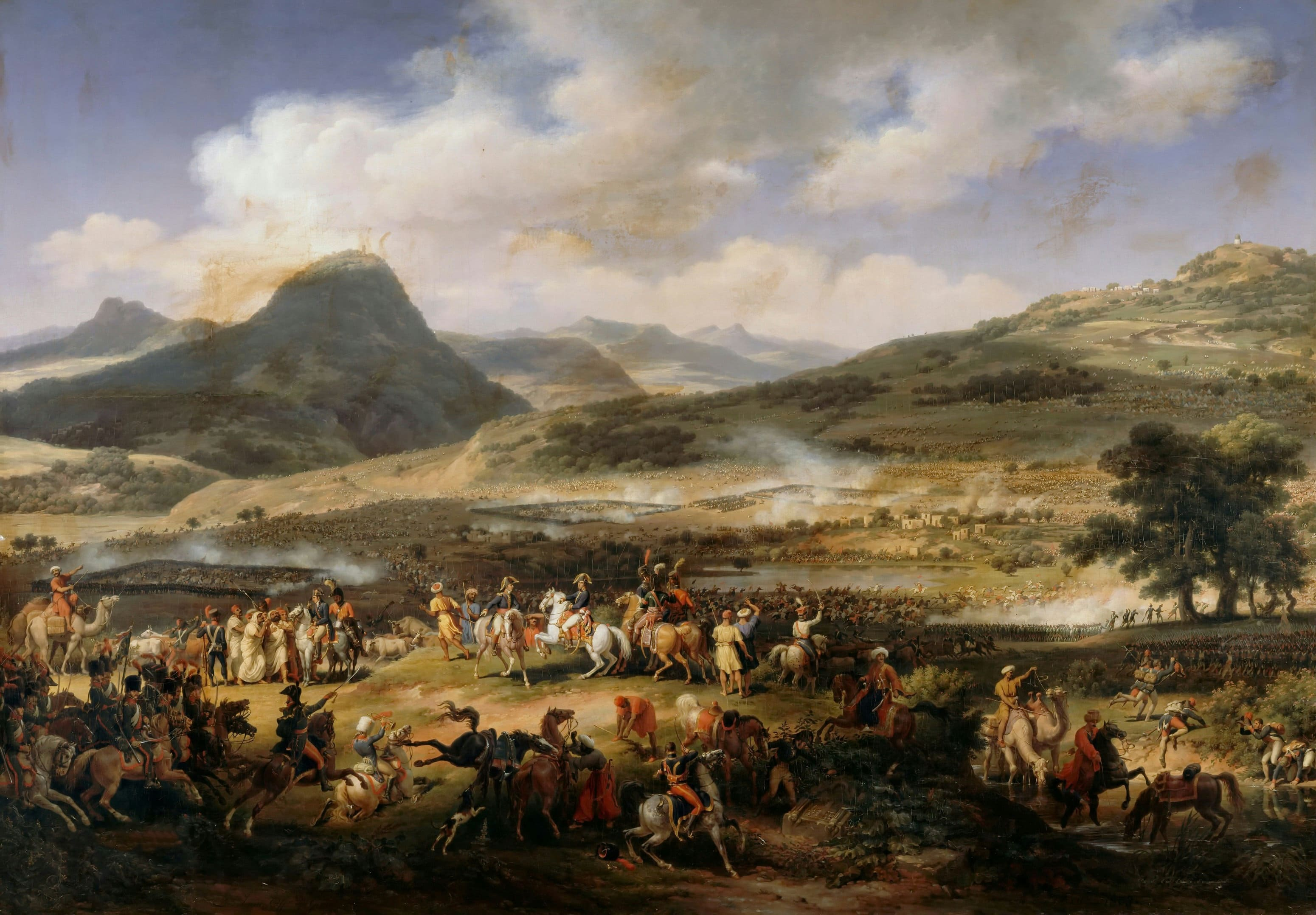
- Artist: Louis-François Lejeune
- Year: 1808
- Type: Oil on canvas, history painting
- Dimensions: 184 cm × 260 cm (72 in × 100 in)
- Location: Palace of Versailles, Versailles

The Battle of Mount Tabor (French: La Bataille du mont Tabor) is an oil on canvas history painting by the French artist Louis-François Lejeune, from 1808.

== History and description ==
It depicts a panoramic view of the Battle of Mount Tabor fought on 16 April 1799 during the French invasion of Egypt and Syria. The battle, fought several miles west of Mount Tabor, was a decisive victory for French forces led by General Napoleon Bonaparte over their Ottoman and Mamluk opponents.

Lejeune exhibited a sketch at the Salon of 1804 and then the full version at the Salon of 1808 at the Louvre, in Paris. Today it is part of the collection at the Palace of Versailles, having been acquired in 1861.

== Bibliography ==
- Hornstein, Katie. Picturing War in France, 1792–1856. Yale University Press, 2018.
- Strathern, Paul. Napoleon in Egypt. Random House, 2008.
