= Louis-François Lejeune =

French Army officer and painter (1775–1848)

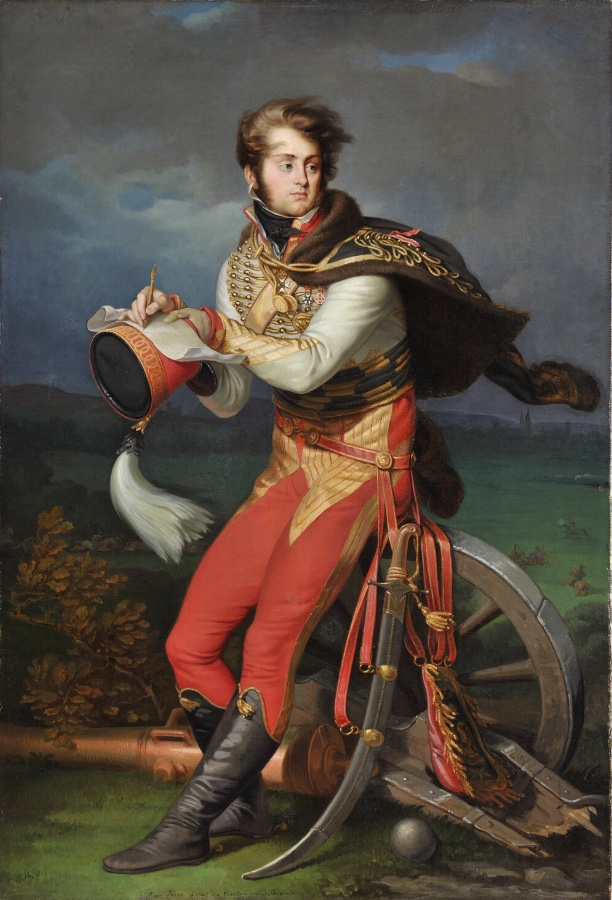
- Portrait of Lejeune after a Jean-Urbain Guérin portrait
- Born: 3 February 1775; Strasbourg, France
- Died: 29 February 1848 (aged 73) Toulouse, France
- Allegiance: Kingdom of France; French First Republic; First French Empire
- Branch: French Royal Army; French Revolutionary Army; French Imperial Army
- Service years: 1792–1824
- Rank: Brigade general
- Conflicts: French Revolutionary Wars; Napoleonic Wars
- Awards: Commander of the Legion of Honour; Knight of the Order of Saint Louis
- Other work: Mayor of Toulouse; Painter and engraver

Brigade-General Louis-François, Baron Lejeune (3 February 1775 – 29 February 1848) was a French Army officer, painter, lithographer and politician who served in the French Revolutionary and Napoleonic Wars. His memoirs have frequently been republished and his name is engraved on the Arc de Triomphe.

== Life ==
He studied painting in the studio of Pierre-Henri de Valenciennes, alongside Jean-Victor Bertin, but left the studio to volunteer in the Compagnie des arts de Paris in 1792. He received his baptism of fire in the battle of Valmy later that year. He became a sergeant in the 1st Arsenal battalion and in 1793 moved to the artillery at La Fère, assisting in the sieges of Landrecies, Le Quesnoy and Valenciennes. At Valenciennes he became aide-de-camp to General Jacob then, as a lieutenant on attachment to the engineers, took part in the 1794 Holland campaign and the 1795 campaign.

Called to the depot in 1798, he succeeded brilliantly in his exams and was made a captain on attachment to the engineers. He became aide-de-camp to Marshal Berthier in 1800, a post he retained until 1812 and in which he took an active part in practically all of the Napoleonic campaigns. He was wounded and captured in Spain. He was promoted to full captain after Marengo and chef de bataillon after Austerlitz, also becoming a knight of the Légion d'honneur and a colonel at the Siege of Saragossa.

The German campaign of 1806 brought him to Munich, where he visited the workshop of Alois Senefelder, the inventor of lithography. Lejeune was fascinated by the possibilities of the new method and while there he made the drawing on stone of his famous Cossack (printed by C. and ~f. Senefelder, 1806). While he was taking his dinner, and with his horses harnessed and waiting to take him back to Paris, one hundred proofs were printed, one of which he subsequently submitted to Napoleon. The introduction of lithography into France was greatly due to the efforts of Lejeune.

In 1812, during the French invasion of Russia, he was made brigade general and chief of staff to Davout. Frostbitten on the face, Lejeune left his post during the retreat from Russia and was arrested on the orders of Napoleon. Freed in March 1813, Lejeune was then sent to the Illyrian provinces, before rejoining the army under the orders of Marshal Oudinot, becoming his chief of staff. During the Saxony campaign, Lejeune was present at the Battle of Lutzen (1813), the crossing of the River Spree and at Bautzen. He was made an officer of the Légion d'honneur and a commander of the Order of Maximilian of Bavaria. At the Battle of Hoyersverda, when Friedrich Wilhelm Bülow von Dennewitz's corps wiped out the 12th corps formed up in square on the plain, Lejeune (at risk of being kidnapped) ventured into the enemy lines with one battalion, General Wolf's cavalry and six 12 pounder guns. He thus broke the whole of the Prussian artillery and saved marshal Oudinot and his army. Wounded several times and lastly at Hanau, he was authorised to leave the army in November 1813 after more than 20 years' service. After his departure from the army, he devoted himself to painting.

After an initial grant in Hanover in 1808, and a second in Westphalia in 1810, he was made a baron d'Empire in 1810. Already a member of the cross of the Order of Leopold, Lejeune was made a knight of St Louis by Louis XVIII and in 1823 a commander of the Légion d'honneur. He returned to the army (now under the Bourbons) from 1818 to 1824, becoming commander of Haute-Garonne in 1831. On 2 September 1821 he married Louise Clary, sister of General Marius Clary and niece of Désirée Clary, queen of Sweden by her marriage with Jean-Baptiste Bernadotte. In 1824 the king of Sweden conferred on Lejeune the grand-cross of the Order of the Sword. In 1837 he became director of the École des beaux-arts et de l’industrie in Toulouse, a city of which he became mayor in 1841 and in which he died of a heart attack aged 73.

== Honours and awards ==
- 1808: Knight of the Legion of Honour (France)
- 1810: Order of Leopold (Austrian Empire)
- 1813: Officer of the Legion of Honour
- 1823: Commander of the Legion of Honour
- 1824: Grand Cross of the Order of the Sword (Sweden)
- Knight of the Order of Saint Louis (France)

Lejeune's name has been inscribed on the Arc de Triomphe in Paris (19th column).

== Works ==
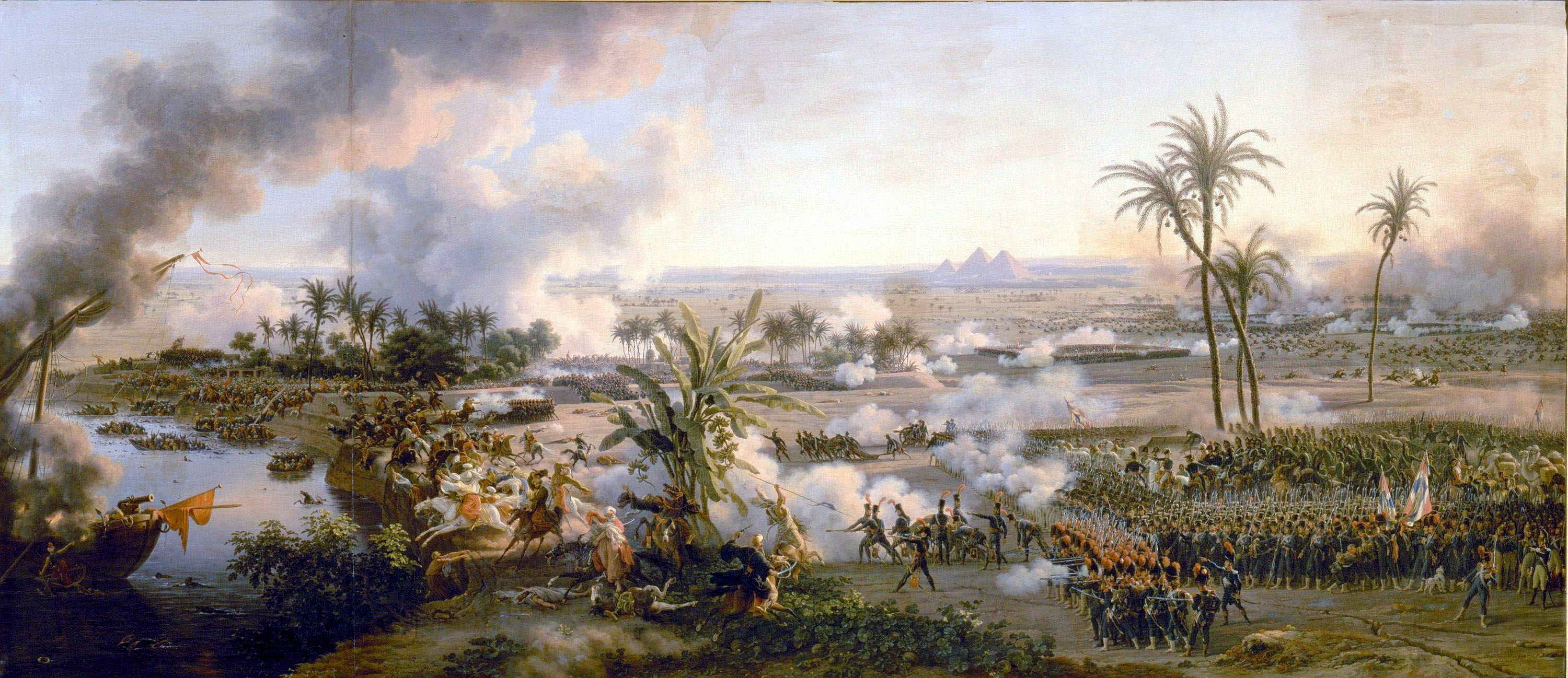
The Battle of the Pyramids (1808)

He produced an important series of battle-pictures based on his experiences. He had kept his paintbrushes with him on the battlefield and the popularity he enjoyed was due to the truth and vigour of his work, which was generally executed from sketches and studies made on the battlefield. His works are known for their lofty perspective' "offering a panoramic view of the totality of the battle's events." When his battle-pictures were shown at the Egyptian Hall in London, a rail had to be put up to protect them from the eager crowds of sightseers. He is best known for his paintings of the Battle of Guisando, which appeared in 1819 to enormous success, and of the Battle of Borodino, his masterwork. Many of his battle-pictures were engraved by Jacques Joseph Coiny and Edme Bovinet. He also produced several studies of uniforms in the French Imperial Army, such as those of the lancers of Berg under Murat and of Berthier's aides-de-camp.

Among his chief works are The Entry of Charles X. into Paris, 6 June 1825 (commemorating the Coronation of Charles X) at Versailles; Episode of the Prussian War, October 1807 at Douai Museum; Marengo (1801); Lodi, Thabor, Aboukir (1804); The Pyramids (1806); and Passage of the Rhine in 1795 (1824).

== In fiction ==
In the historical novel The Battle, Lejeune is a main character.

== Gallery ==
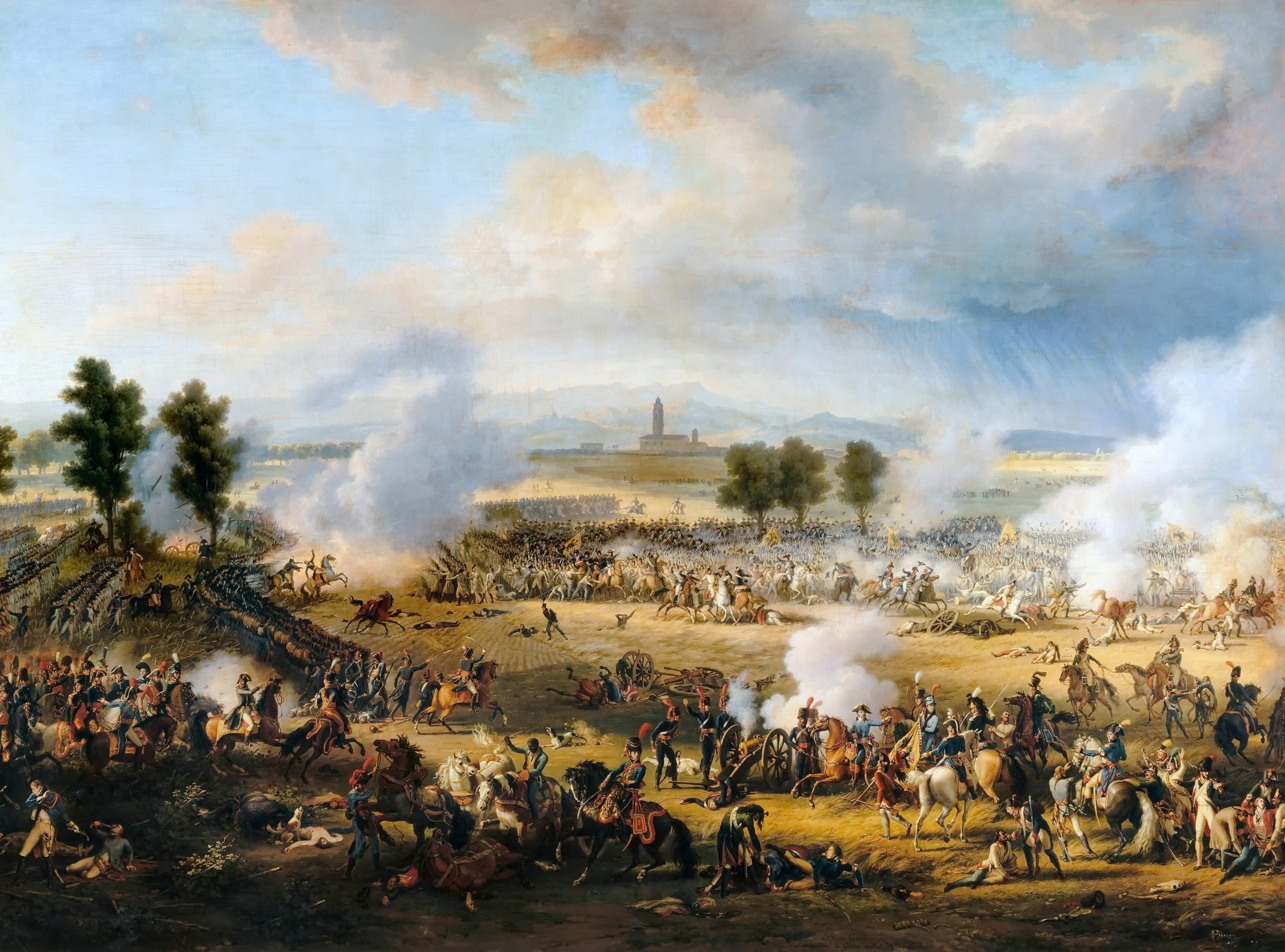
The Battle of Marengo (1801)

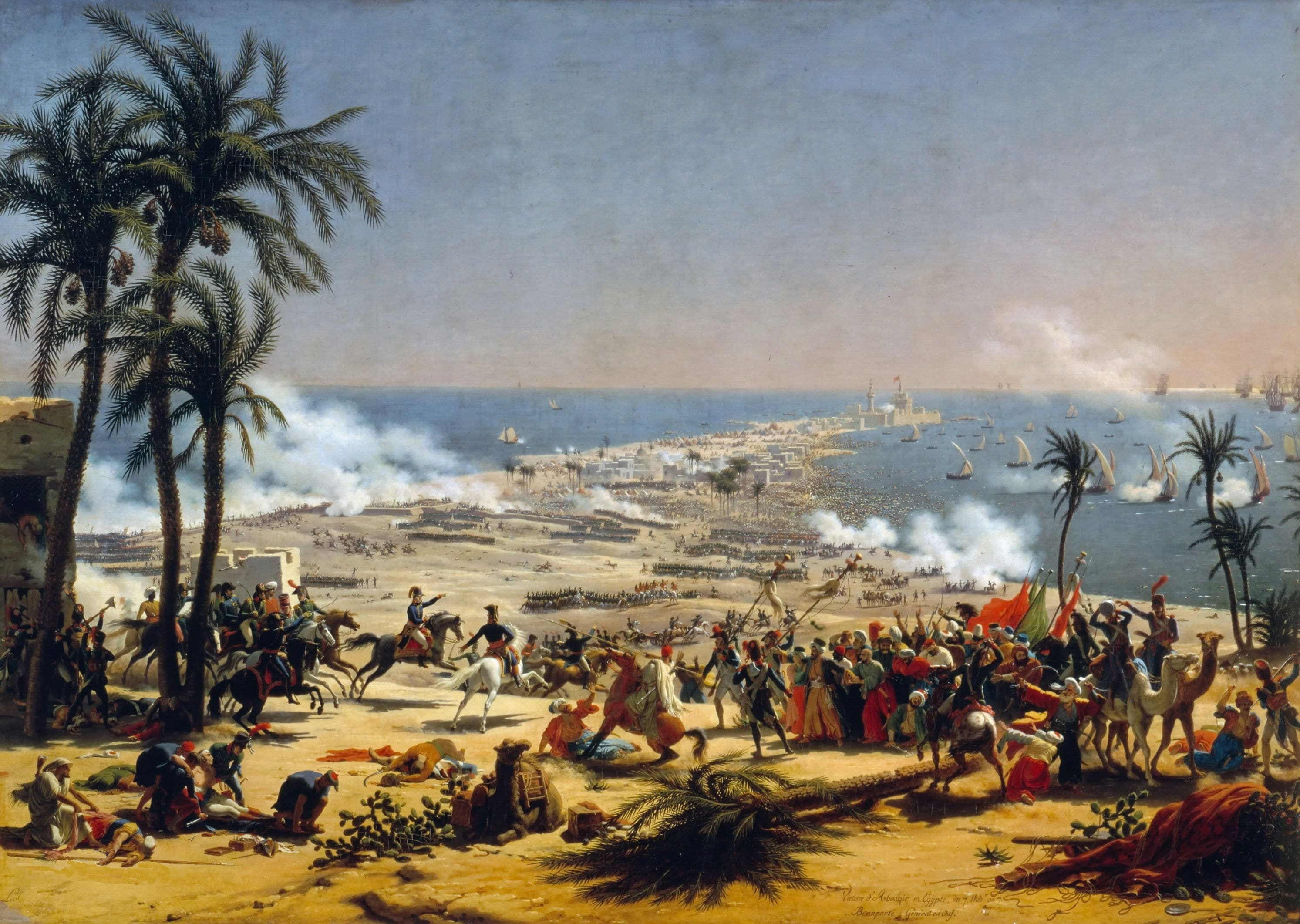
Battle of Aboukir, 27 July 1799 (1804)

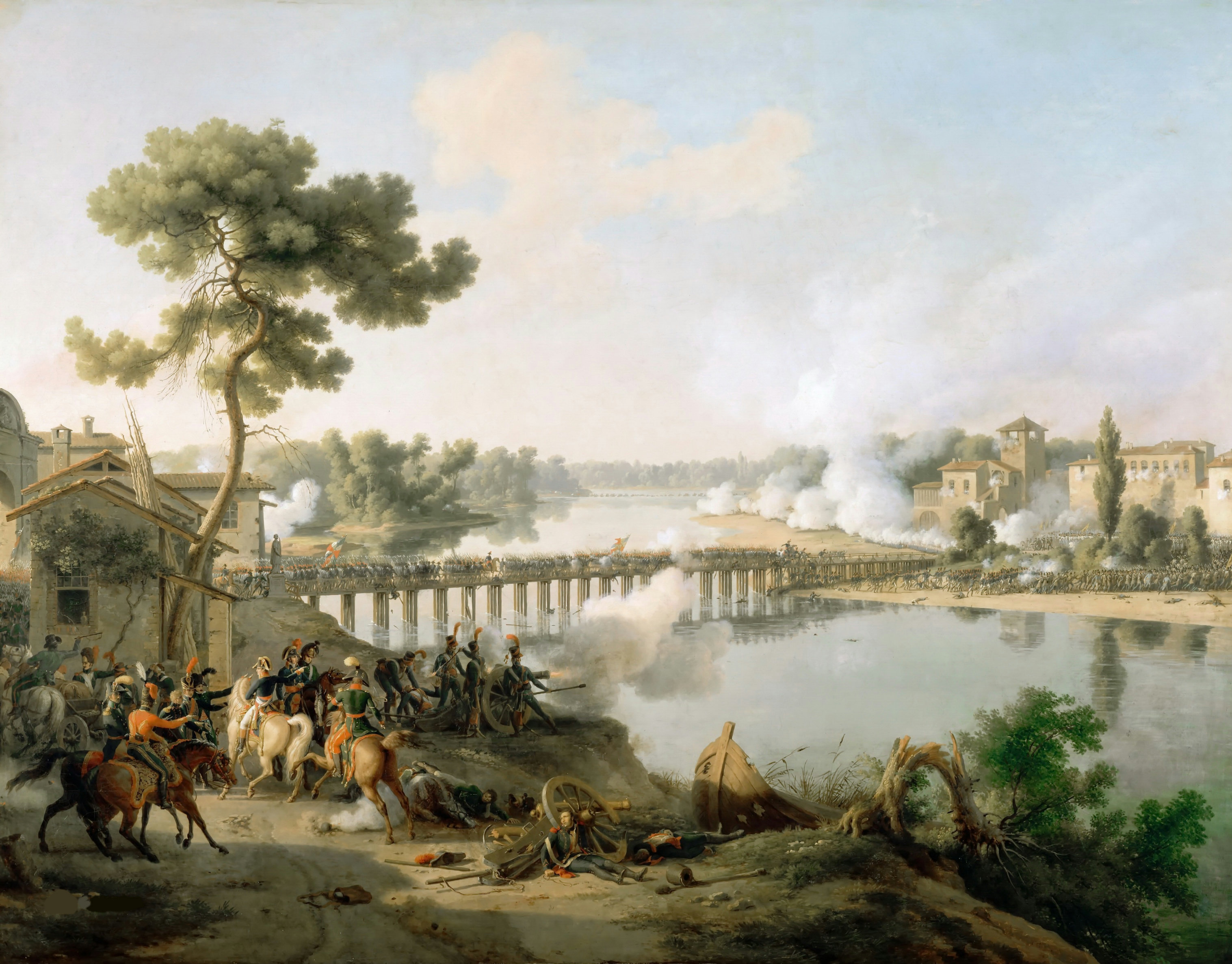
The Battle of Lodi (1804)

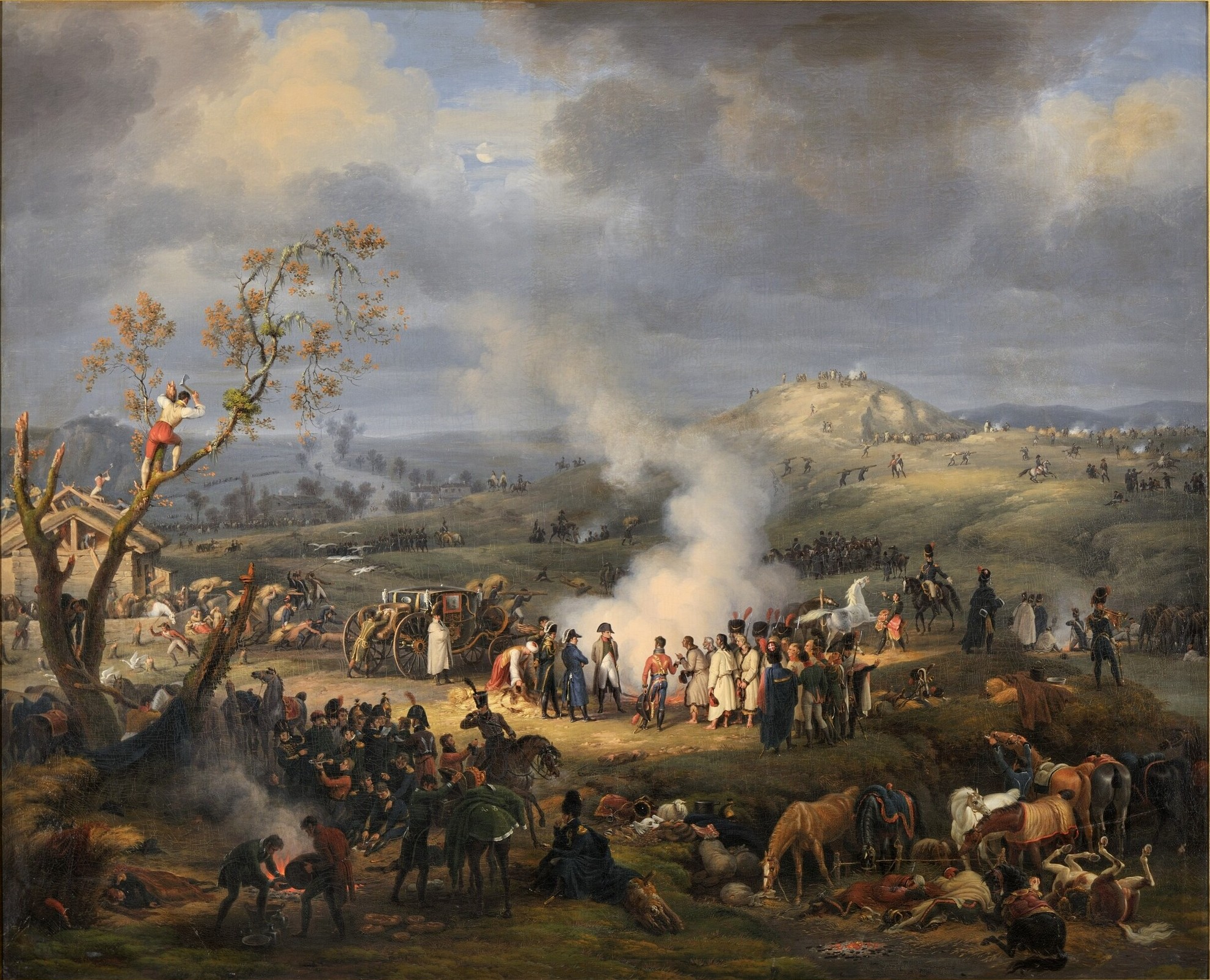
Bivouac on the Eve of the Battle of Austerlitz (1808)

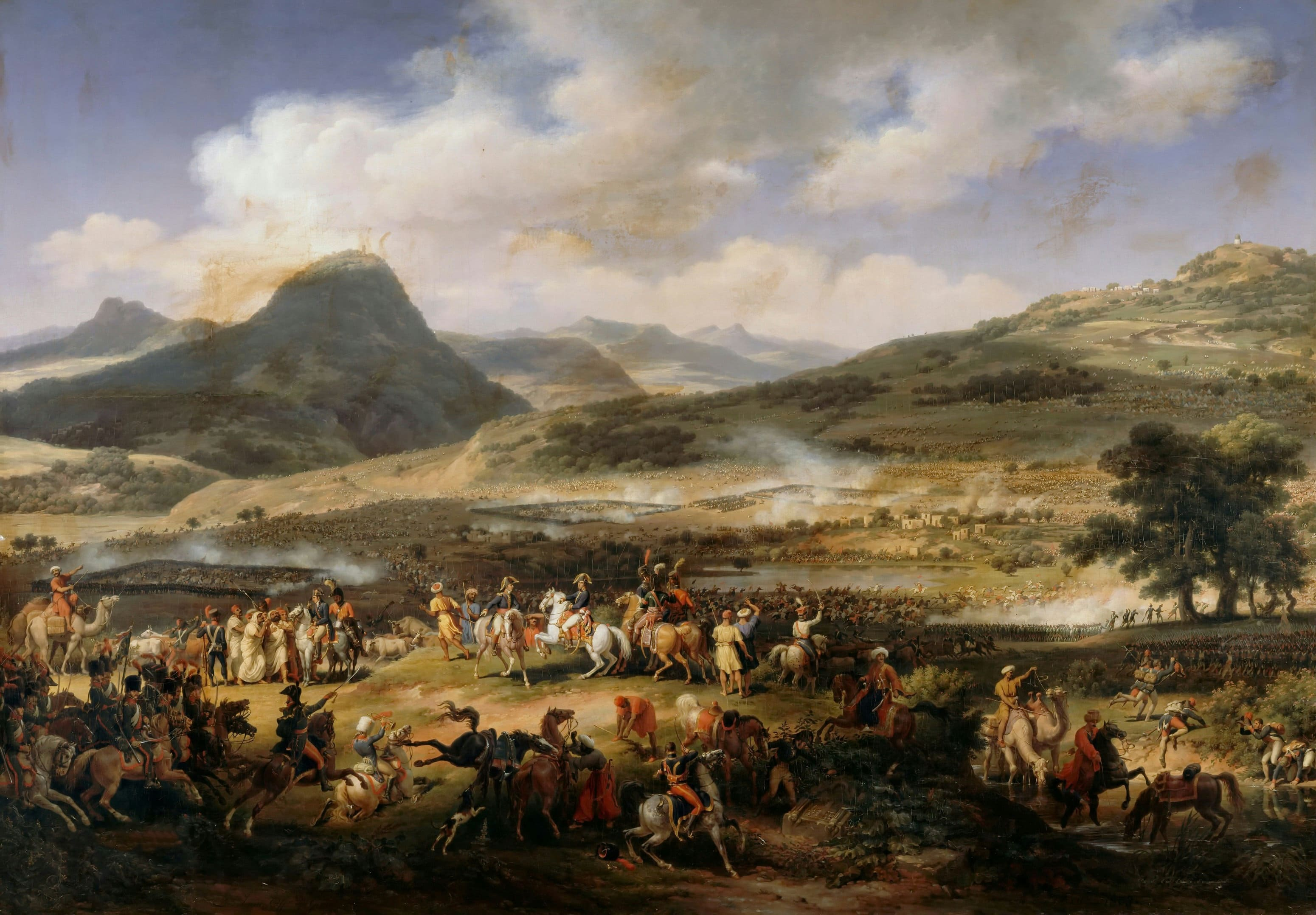
The Battle of Mount Tabor (1808)

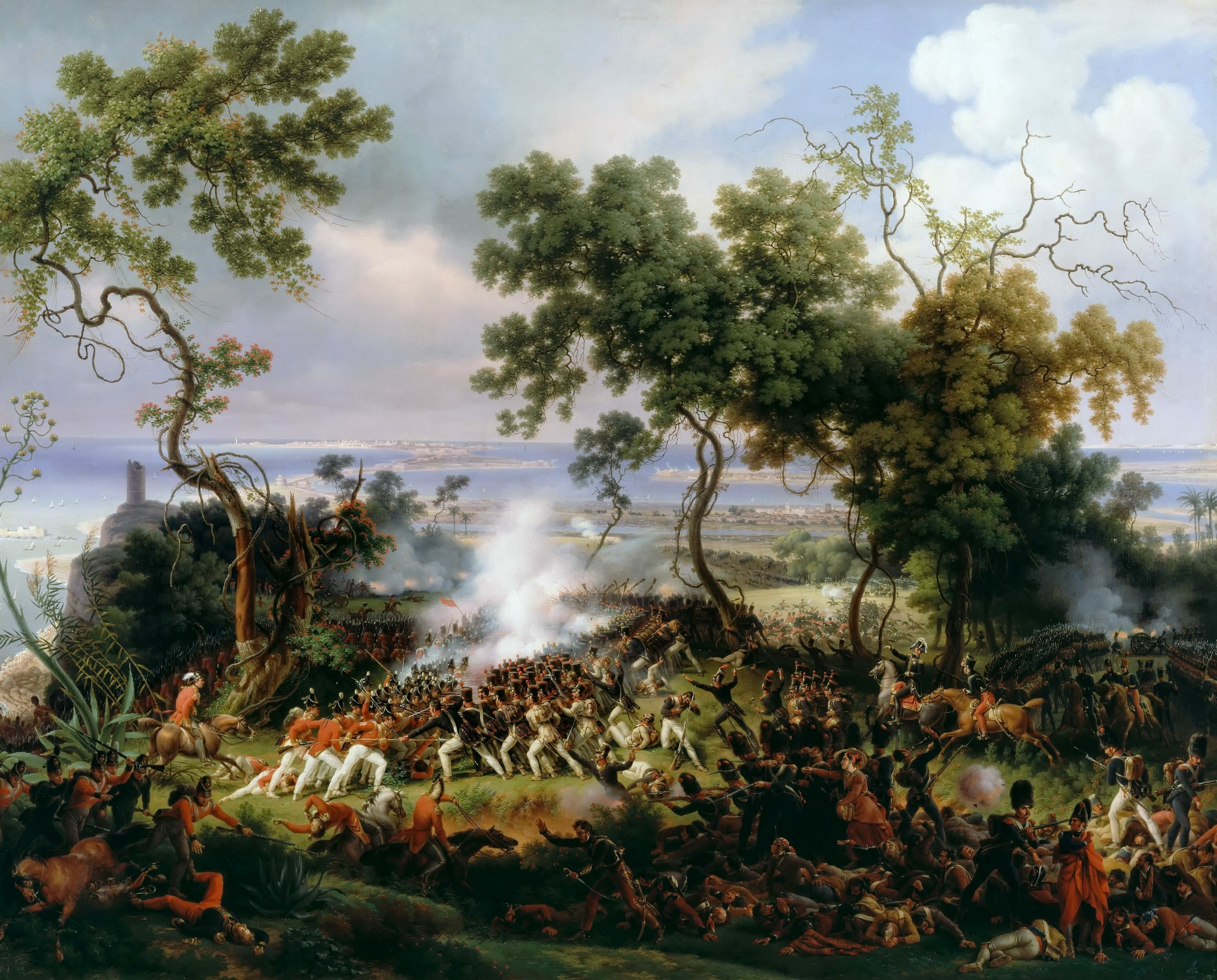
Battle of Chiclana, 5 March 1811 (1812)

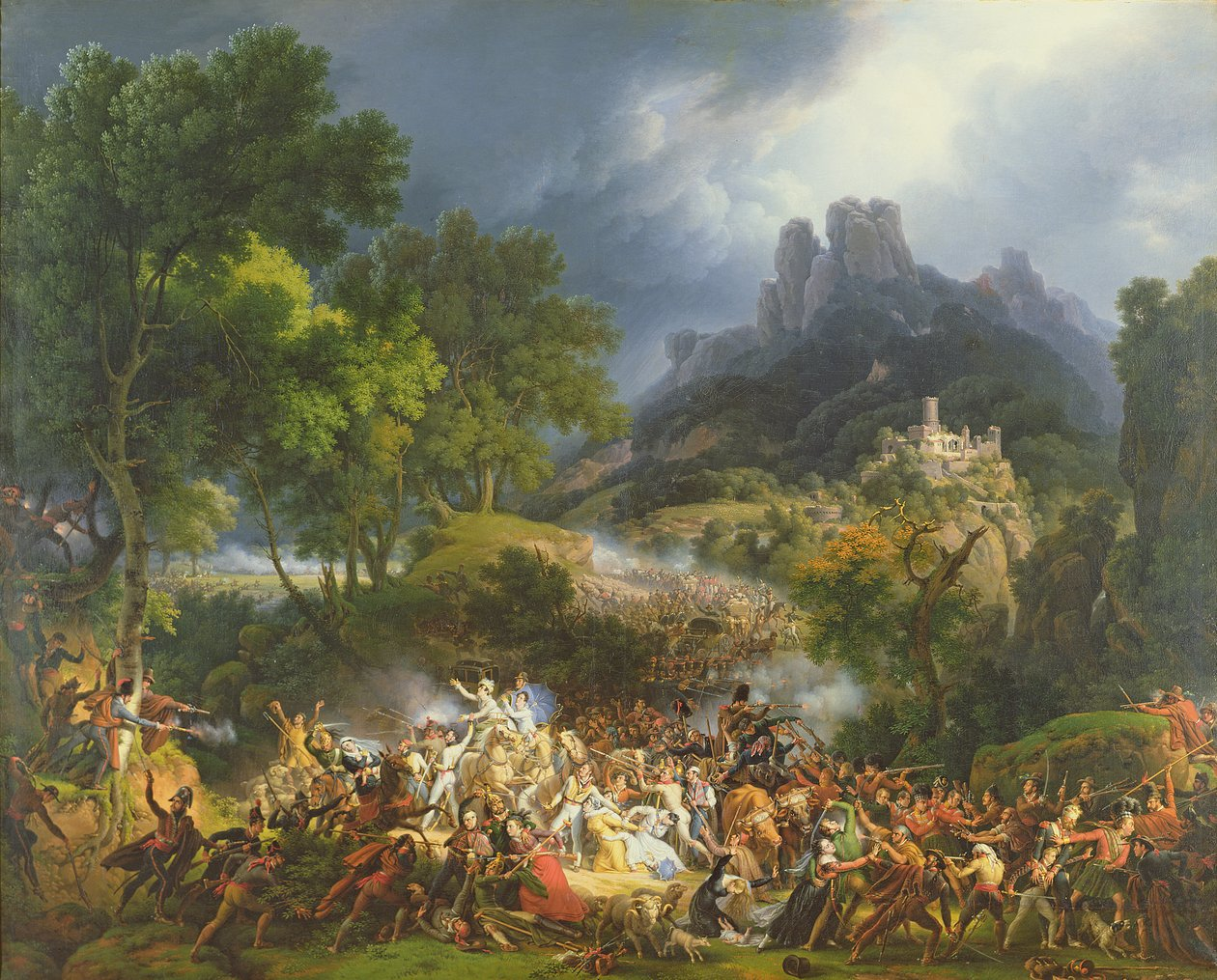
Attack on a Large Convoy at Salinas (1819)

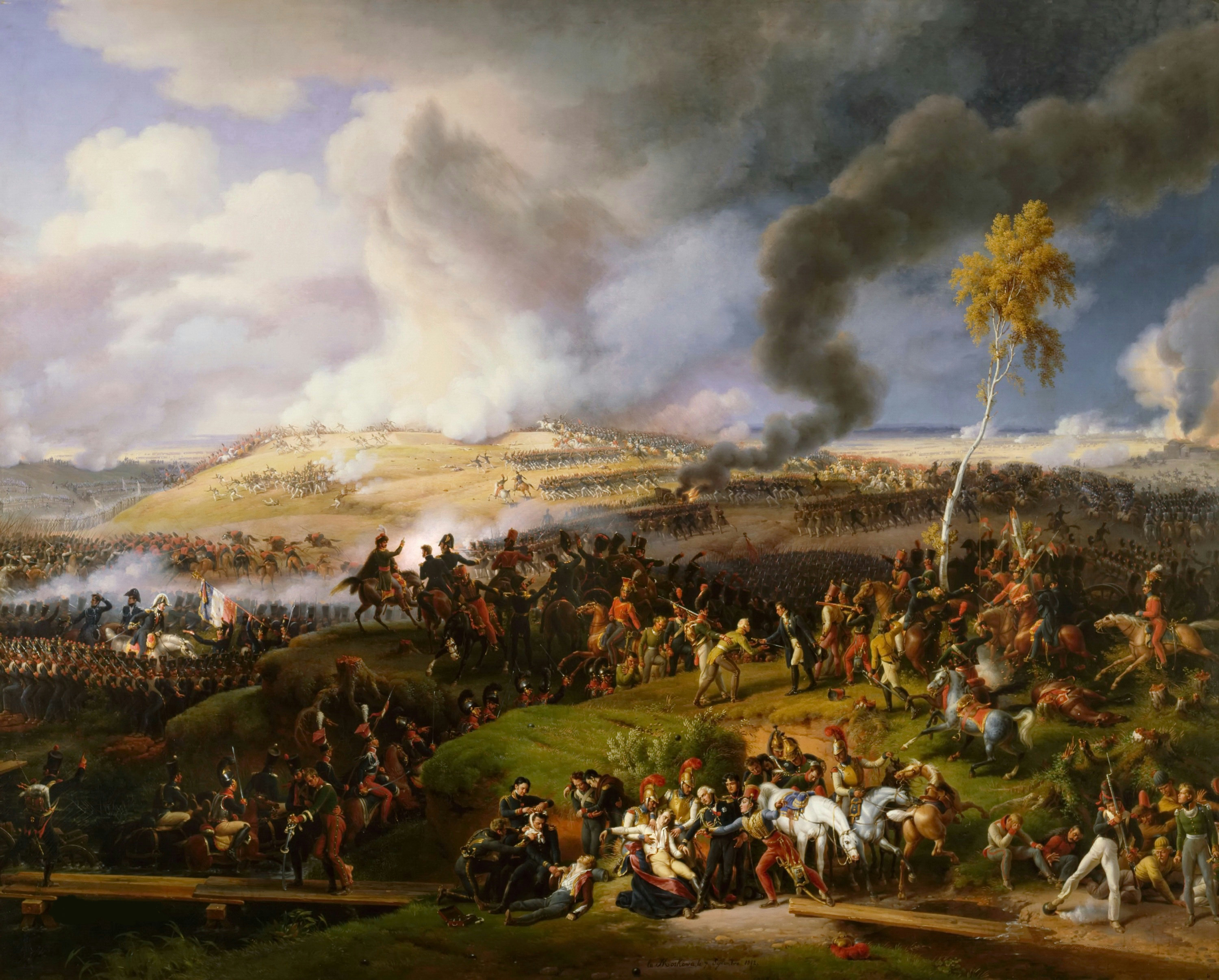
The Battle of Moscow (1822)

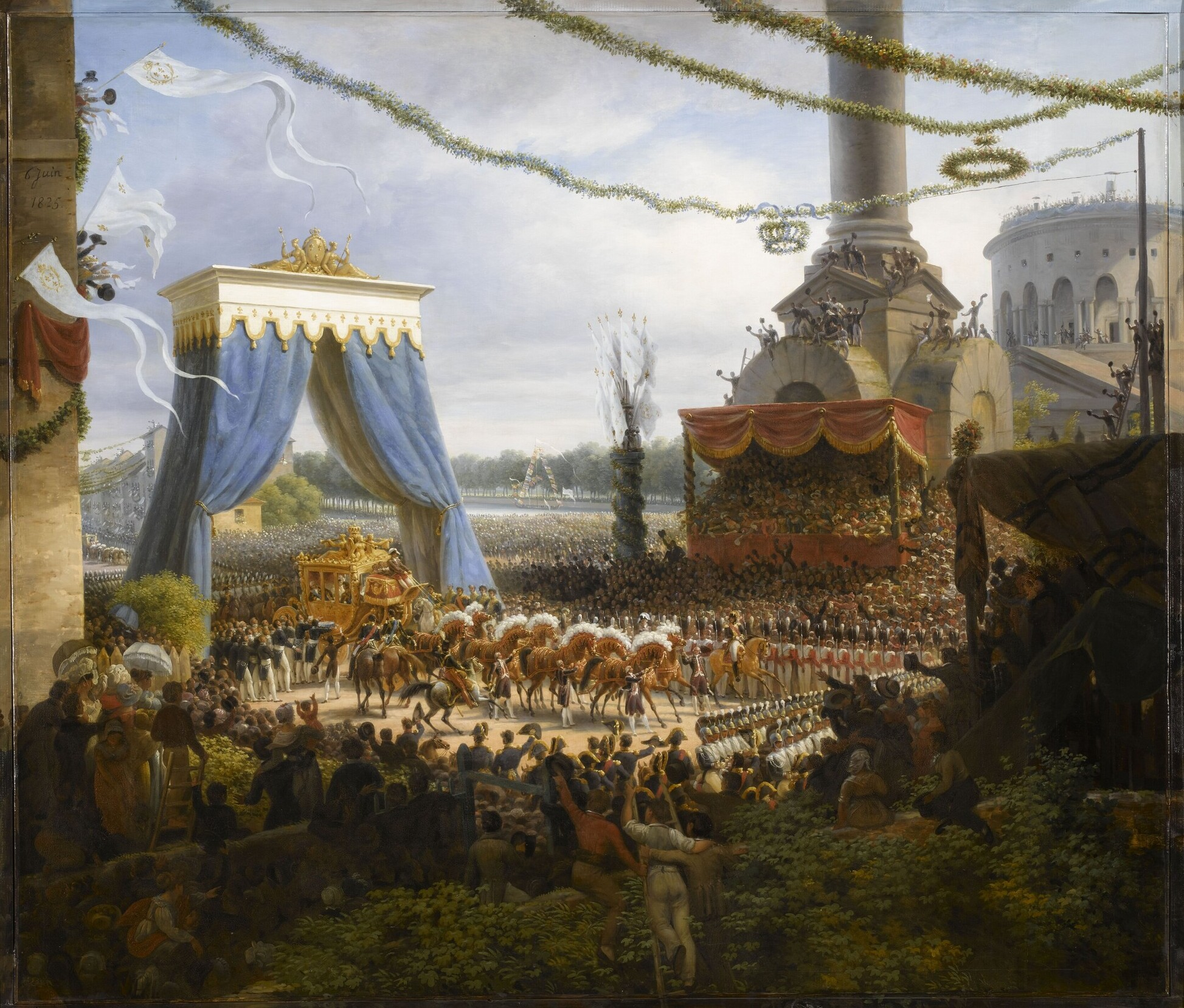
Entry of Charles X into Paris After His Coronation (1825)

== Sources ==
- Fournier Sarlovèze, Raymond-Joseph (1902). "Le Général Lejeune". Artistes oubliés (in French). Paris: P. Ollendorf. pp. 167–192.
- Maenius, Chase (2014). The Art of War[s]. Blurb. ISBN 9781320309554.
