= Montenotte campaign order of battle =

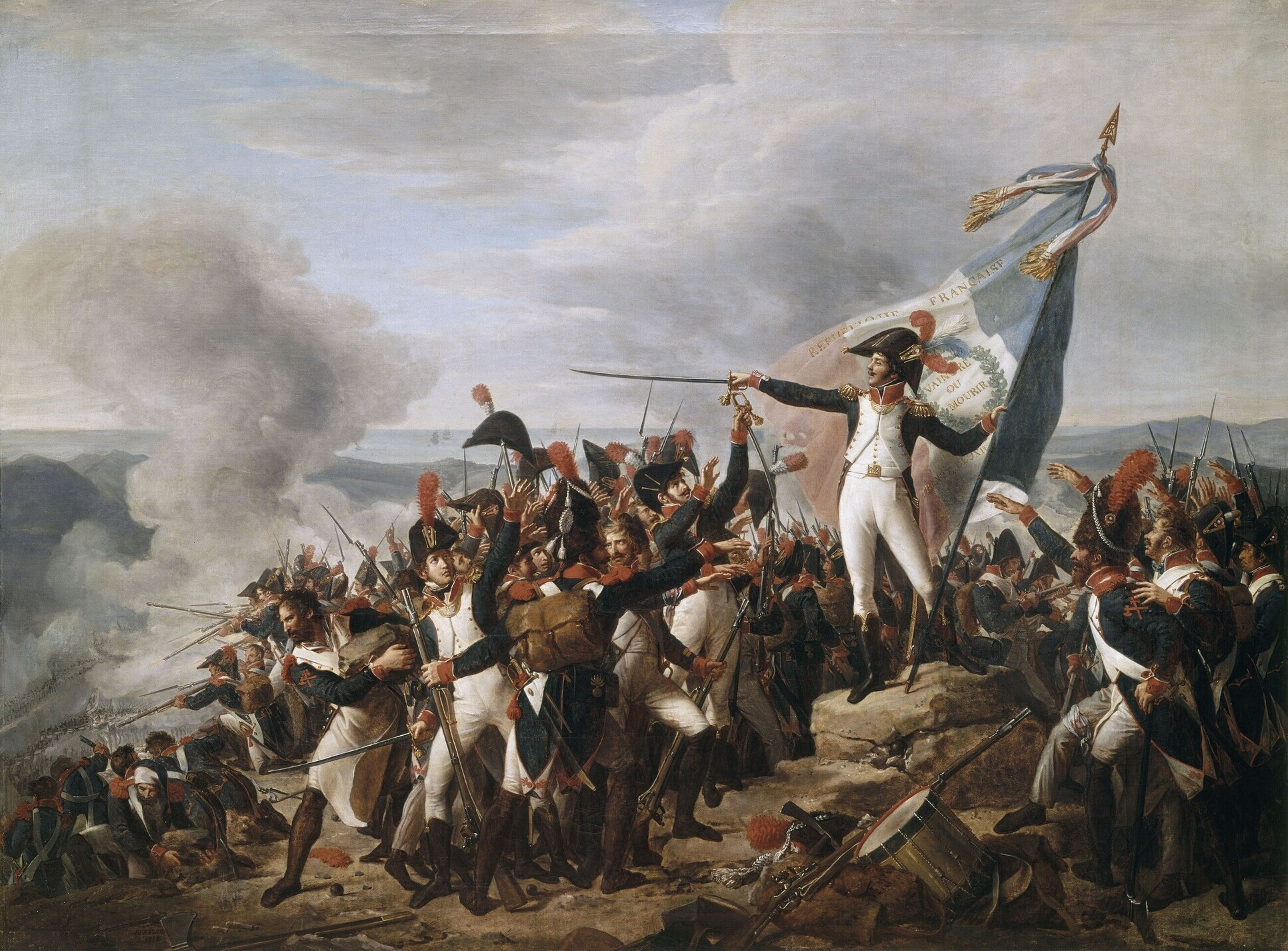
The Battle of Montenotte, the campaign's second engagement

In the Montenotte campaign between 10 and 28 April 1796, General Napoleon Bonaparte's French Army of Italy broke the link between Feldzeugmeister Johann Peter Beaulieu's Austrian army and Feldmarschallleutnant Michelangelo Alessandro Colli-Marchi's Sardinian army. In subsequent engagements, the French defeated the Austrians, pursued Colli to the west, and forced the Sardinians to withdraw from the First Coalition against France. Actions were fought at Voltri (now a suburb of Genoa) on 10 April, Monte Negino (Legino) on 11 April, Montenotte on 12 April, Millesimo on 13 April, Second Battle of Dego on 14–15 April, Ceva on 16 April, San Michele Mondovi on 19 April, and Mondovì on 21 April.

== Abbreviations used ==
=== Military rank ===
- GD = General of Division (French army or division commander)
- GB = General of Brigade (French brigade commander)
- FZM = Feldzeugmeister (Austrian army or corps commander)
- FLM = Feldmarschall-Leutnant (Austrian division commander)
- GM = Generalmajor (Austrian brigade commander)

=== Other ===
- k = Killed
- old = The old numbers of the infantry units. In March 1796, the French army reorganized the demi-brigades and assigned new numbers. Boycott-Brown gives the new numbers while Smith gives the old ones. For example, the new 51st Line Demi-Brigade was formerly the 99th Line.

== French Army order of battle ==
=== French Army on April 9 ===
Army of Italy (France): Napoleon Bonaparte (42,717 in the field, 64,356 total)

- Cavalry: General of Division Henri Christian Michel de Stengel (k)
  - 1st Cavalry Division: Henri Stengel (3,090)
    - General of Brigade: Marc Antoine de Beaumont
    - 1st Hussar Regiment (4 squadrons)
    - 10th Chasseur Regiment (4 squadrons)
    - 22nd Chasseur Regiment (4 squadrons)
    - 25th Chasseur Regiment (3 squadrons)
    - 5th Dragoon Regiment (3 squadrons)
    - 20th Dragoon Regiment (3 squadrons)
  - 2nd Cavalry Division: General of Division Charles Edward Jennings de Kilmaine (1,778)
    - 7th Hussar Regiment (4 squadrons)
    - 13th Hussar Regiment (3 squadrons)
    - 24th Chasseur Regiment (4 squadrons)
    - 8th Dragoon Regiment (3 squadrons)
    - 15th Dragoon Regiment (3 squadrons)
- Advance Guard: General of Division André Masséna
  - 1st Division: General of Division Amédée Emmanuel François Laharpe (8,614)
    - Generals of Brigade: Jean Joseph Magdeleine Pijon, Philippe Romain Ménard
    - 17th Light Demi-Brigade (3 battalions)
    - 22nd Light Demi-Brigade (3 battalions)
    - 32nd Line Demi-Brigade (3 battalions)
    - 75th Line Demi-Brigade (3 battalions)
  - 2nd Division: General of Division Jean-Baptiste Meynier (9,526)
    - Generals of Brigade: Elzéar Auguste Cousin de Dommartin, Barthélemy Catherine Joubert, Jean-Baptiste Cervoni
    - 11th Light Demi-Brigade (2 battalions)
    - 25th Line Demi-Brigade (3 battalions)
    - 51st Line Demi-Brigade (3 battalions)
    - 27th Light Demi-Brigade (1 battalion)
    - old 51st Line Demi-Brigade (1 battalion)
    - old 55th Line Demi-Brigade (1 battalion)
- Not organized into corps:
  - 3rd Division: General of Division Pierre Augereau (10,117)
    - Generals of Brigade: Martial Beyrand, Claude Perrin Victor, Pierre Banel (k), Jean-Baptiste Dominique Rusca
    - 4th Light Demi-Brigade (2 battalions)
    - 29th Light Demi-Brigade (2 battalions)
    - 4th Line Demi-Brigade (3 battalions)
    - 18th Line Demi-Brigade (3 battalions)
    - 14th Line Demi-Brigade (1 battalion)
  - 4th Division: General of Division Jean-Mathieu-Philibert Sérurier (9,448)
    - Generals of Brigade: Jean Joseph Guieu, Pascal Antoine Fiorella, Louis Pelletier, Sextius Alexandre François de Miollis
    - 69th Line Demi-Brigade (3 battalions)
    - 39th Line Demi-Brigade (3 battalions)
    - 85th Line Demi-Brigade (3 battalions)
  - 5th Division: General of Division François Macquard (3,690)
    - Generals of Brigade: Jean David, Claude Dallemagne
    - old 22nd Line Demi-Brigade (1 battalion)
    - old 100th Line Demi-Brigade (3 battalions)
  - 6th Division: General of Division Pierre Dominique Garnier (3,136)
    - Generals of Brigade: Jean Davin, Guilin Laurent Bizanet, Joseph Colomb
    - old 20th Line Demi-Brigade (3 battalions)
    - old 7th Provisional Demi-Brigade (2 battalions)
  - 7th Division: General of Division André Mouret (4,808)
    - Generals of Brigade: Emmanuel de Serviez, Gaspard Amédée Gardanne, Pierre Verne
    - old 83rd Line Demi-Brigade (3 battalions)
    - old 13th Line Demi-Brigade (1 battalion)
    - old 10th Provisional Demi-Brigade (2 battalions)
    - Grenadiers (1 bn)
  - 8th Division: General of Division Raphael Casabianca (3,125)
    - Generals of Brigade: François Parra, François Guillot
    - old 15th Light Demi-Brigade (3 battalions)
    - old Jura and Hérault Demi-Brigade (1 battalion)
  - 9th Division: General of Division Antoine Casalta (1,045)
    - old 12th Line Demi-Brigade (1 battalion)
    - old 56th Line Demi-Brigade (1 battalion)
  - Reserve: (1,900)
    - 5 battalions

=== Key ===
- Note: It is unknown which brigadiers to whom the demi-brigades were assigned.

== Allied Army order of battle ==
=== Austrian Army on April 1 ===
Austrian Army: Feldzeugmeister Johann Peter Beaulieu (32,000 infantry, 5,000 cavalry, 148 guns)

- Division: Feldmarschallleutnant Eugène-Guillaume Argenteau
  - Brigade: General-Major Mathias Rukavina von Boynograd (Dego)
    - Carlstadt Grenz Infantry Regiment (1st battalion)
    - Preiss Infantry Regiment Nr. 24 (1 battalion)
    - Toscana Infantry Regiment Nr. 23 (1 battalion)
    - Brechainville Infantry Regiment Nr. 25 (1 battalion)
  - Brigade: General-Major Anton Lipthay de Kisfalud (Acqui Terme - Ovada)
    - Carlstadt Grenz Infantry Regiment (2nd battalion)
    - Pellegrini Infantry Regiment Nr. 49 (1 battalion)
    - Alvinczi Infantry Regiment Nr. 19 (1 battalion)
    - Erdödy Hussar Regiment Nr. 9 (2 squadrons)
- Division: Feldmarschallleutnant Karl Philipp Sebottendorf
  - Brigade: Oberst (Colonel) Karl Wetzel (Tortona)
    - Wenzel Colloredo Infantry Regiment Nr. 56 (2 battalions)
    - Mészáros Uhlan Regiment Nr. 1 (2 squadrons)
  - Brigade: Oberst Karl Salisch (Alessandria)
    - Terzi Infantry Regiment Nr. 16 (1 battalion)
    - Lattermann Infantry Regiment Nr. 45 (1 battalion)
    - Stein Infantry Regiment Nr. 50 (1 battalion)
- Unattached brigades:
  - Brigade: General-Major Wilhelm Lothar Maria von Kerpen (Pavia)
    - Archduke Anton Infantry Regiment Nr. 52 (2 battalions)
    - Wilhelm Schröder Infantry Regiment Nr. 26 (1 battalion)
    - Huff Infantry Regiment Nr. 8 (1 battalion)
  - Brigade: General-Major Franz Nicoletti (Lodi)
    - Thurn Infantry Regiment Nr. 43 (3 battalions)
    - Michael Wallis Infantry Regiment Nr. 11 (1 battalion)
    - Jordis Infantry Regiment Nr. 59 (1 battalion)
  - Brigade: General-Major Gerhard Rosselmini (Lodi)
    - Deutschmeister Infantry Regiment Nr. 4 (1 battalion)
    - Strassoldo Infantry Regiment Nr. 27 (2 battalions)
  - Cavalry Brigade: General-Major Anton Schübirz von Chobinin (Pavia)
    - Archduke Joseph Hussar Regiment Nr. 2 (10 squadrons)
    - Mészáros Uhlan Regiment Nr. 1 (? squadrons)
  - Brigade: General-Major Philipp Pittoni von Dannenfeld (Near Novi Ligure)
    - Reisky Infantry Regiment Nr. 13 (3 battalions)
    - Nádasdy Infantry Regiment Nr. 39 (2 battalions)
    - Terzi Infantry Regiment Nr. 16 (1 battalion)
    - Lattermann Infantry Regiment Nr. 45 (1 battalion)
    - Szluiner Grenz Infantry Regiment (1 battalion)
  - Neapolitan Cavalry Brigade: Prince di Cuto (Lodi)
    - Rey Cavalry Regiment (4 squadrons)
    - Regina Cavalry Regiment (4 squadrons)
    - Principe Cavalry Regiment (4 squadrons)

=== Sardinian Army ===
Sardinian Army: Feldmarschallleutnant Michelangelo Alessandro Colli-Marchi

- Austrian Auxiliary Corps: Feldmarschallleutnant Giovanni Marchese di Provera
  - Belgiojoso Infantry Regiment Nr. 44 (3 battalions)
  - Strassoldo Grenadier battalion
  - Gyulai Freikorps
- Division (at Ceva): General Brempt
  - Colonel Colli-Ricci's Light Infantry (1 battalion)
  - Genevois Infantry Regiment
  - Royal Grenadiers Infantry Regiment (1 battalion)
  - Royal Allemand Infantry Regiment
  - Acqui Infantry Regiment (1 battalion)
- Division (at Ceva): General Giuseppe Felice, Count Vital
  - Foot Chasseurs
  - Savoy Infantry Regiment (1 battalion)
  - Stettler Infantry Regiment (3 battalions)
  - Royal Grenadiers Infantry Regiment (1 battalion)
  - Oneglia Infantry Regiment (2 battalion)
  - Piedmontese Freikorps
  - Mondovì Infantry Regiment (1 battalion)
- Division (at Ceva): General Count di Torneforte
  - Tortona Infantry Regiment (1 battalion)
  - Mondovì Infantry Regiment (1 battalion)
  - Acqui Infantry Regiment (1 battalion)
- Others in the campaign:
  - Commanders: General Jean-Gaspard Dichat de Toisinge (k), General Count de la Chiusa
  - La Marina Infantry Regiment (2 battalions)
  - Montferrat Infantry Regiment (1 battalion)
  - 3rd Grenadiers (1 battalion)

=== Key ===
- Note that Colli-Marchi was an Austrian fighting in the Sardinian army.
