= Battle of Montenotte =

Battle of the Montenotte campaign

- Part of the Montenotte campaign and the Italian campaign of 1796–1797
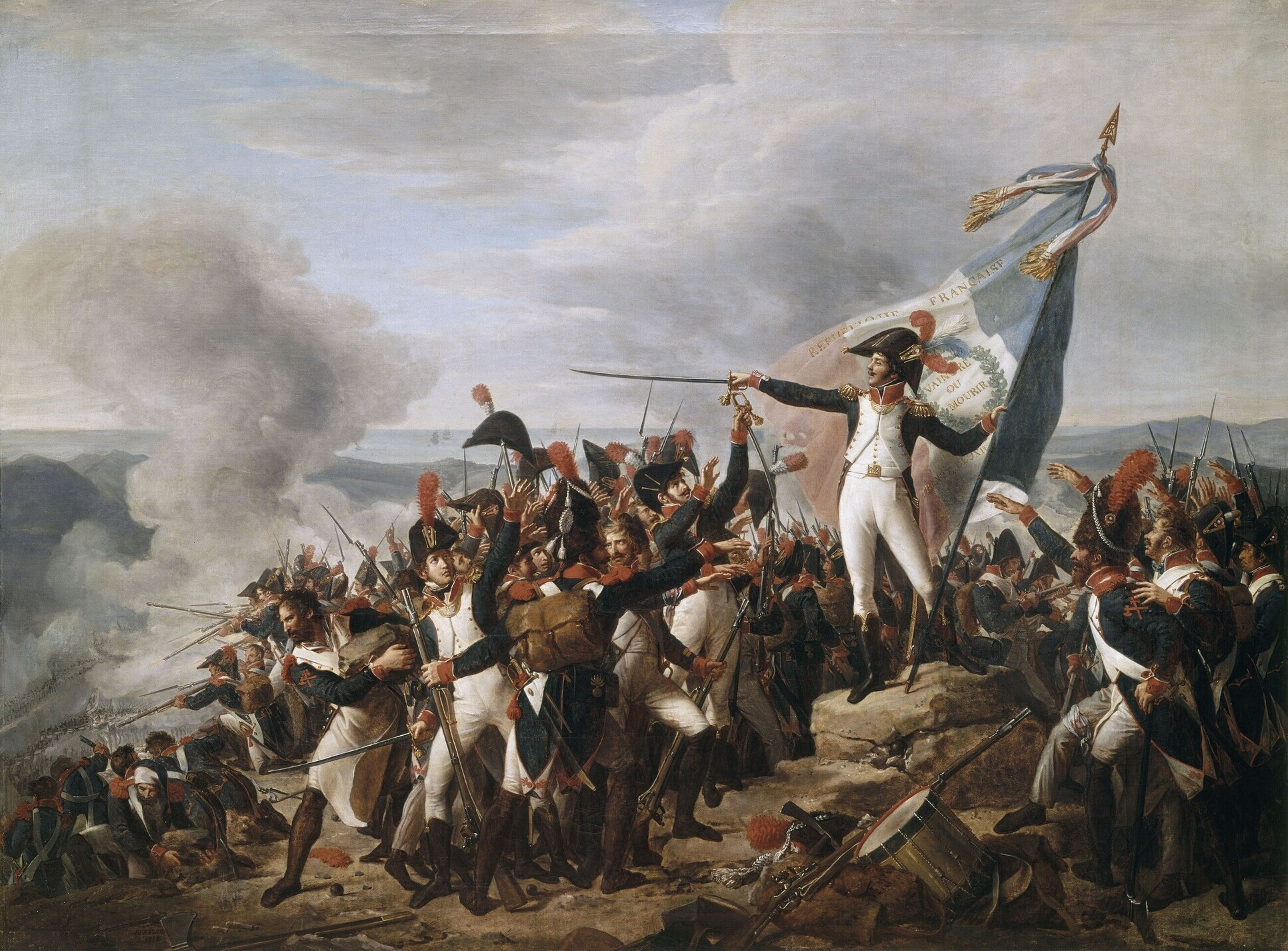
- 1812 painting of the battle
| Date | 11–12 April 1796 |
| Location | Near Cairo Montenotte, (Note: Proximity to M San Giorgio and Naso di Gatto make Montenotte Superiore a far more likely battle location than modern Cairo Montenotte) Italy 44.4000°N 8.2667°E |
| Result | French victory |

Belligerents
| (French First Republic) French Republic | Habsburg monarchy Kingdom of Sardinia |

Commanders and leaders
| (French First Republic) Napoleon Bonaparte (French First Republic) André Masséna (French First Republic) Amédée Laharpe (French First Republic) Antoine Rampon | (Habsburg monarchy) Eugène Argenteau (Habsburg monarchy) Mathias Rukavina |

Strength
| 9,000, 18 guns | 6,000, 12 guns |

Casualties and losses
| ~200 | 3,500; 12 guns |

The Battle of Montenotte was fought on 12 April 1796, near Montenotte Superiore (then in the Kingdom of Sardinia, now in Italy), being the opening engagement of Napoleon Bonaparte's Italian Campaign and the second engagement of the Montenotte campaign. The French Army of Italy, under the command of General Napoleon Bonaparte, defeated an Austrian corps under Field Marshal Eugène-Guillaume Argenteau. The victory successfully severed the connection between the Austrian army and their allies, the army of the Kingdom of Sardinia, allowing Bonaparte to isolate and defeat each force in detail.

By the morning of the 12th, Bonaparte concentrated large forces against Argenteau's now-outnumbered troops. The strongest French push came from the direction of the mountaintop redoubt, but a second force fell on the weak Austrian right flank and overwhelmed it. In its hasty retreat from the field, Argenteau's force lost heavily and was badly disorganized. This attack against the boundary between the Austrian and Sardinian armies threatened to sever the link between the two allies. This action was part of the Montenotte campaign.

== Background ==
See Montenotte 1796 Campaign Order of Battle for the organization of the French, Austrian, and Sardinian armies.

On 27 March 1796, a young General Bonaparte arrived in Nice to take over the Army of Italy, his first army command. His army included 63,000 troops, but of these, only 37,600 men and 60 artillery pieces were capable of being put into the field. The soldiers were badly fed, months behind in pay, and poorly equipped. Consequently, morale in many units was low and in a few cases this had led to mutiny. Bonaparte's Austrian opponent, Feldzeugmeister Johann Peter Beaulieu was also new to the Italian theater of operations. Beaulieu directly controlled 19,500 Austrians of whom half were still in winter quarters. Beaulieu's subordinate Argenteau commanded an additional 11,500 Austrians who were deployed farther to the west around Acqui Terme. A Kingdom of Sardinia-Piedmont army of about 20,000 men was west of Argenteau's corps.

Bonaparte planned to advance from the Ligurian coast to drive a wedge between Beaulieu's Austrian army to the northeast and Feldmarschall-Leutnant Michelangelo Alessandro Colli-Marchi's 21,000-strong Austro-Sardinian army to the northwest. Colli, an Austrian on loan to the Sardinian army, shared a personal friendship with Beaulieu. However, the Austrian government secretly warned Beaulieu not to trust his Sardinian ally. This made it difficult for the two allied leaders to agree on a joint strategy. Colli feared an attack that would split the allied armies, which was exactly the plan that Bonaparte was contemplating. He argued for the allied armies to concentrate in the center. But Beaulieu became convinced that the French intended to seize Genoa, and he intended to thwart that possibility with an attack of his own.

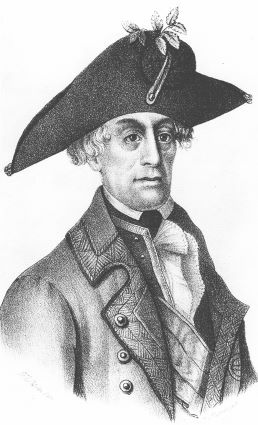
Johann Peter Beaulieu

Based on a muster roll from 9 April, Bonaparte's field army consisted of four divisions under Generals of Division Amédée Emmanuel Francois Laharpe, Jean-Baptiste Meynier, Pierre Augereau, and Jean-Mathieu-Philibert Sérurier. Laharpe and Meynier's divisions formed the advance guard under André Masséna. Laharpe's 8,614 soldiers were divided between the 17th and 22nd Light Infantry Demi-Brigades and the 32nd and 75th Line Infantry Demi-Brigades. Meynier commanded 9,526 men in the 11th and 27th Light and the 25th, 51st, old 51st, and 55th Line. Augereau led 10,117 troops in the 4th and 29th Light and 4th, 14th, and 18th Line. Sérurier directed 9,448 men in the 69th Light, 39th Line, and 85th Line. General of Brigade Jean-Baptiste Cervoni was detached at Voltri with the 3,181 troops of the 75th Line and 2,000 soldiers of the 51st Line.

Beaulieu planned to fall on Cervoni with two columns under General-major Philipp Pittoni von Dannenfeld and Feldmarschall-Leutnant Karl Philipp Sebottendorf. Pittoni had infantry five battalions and four cavalry squadrons totalling 3,350 foot soldiers and 624 horsemen. Sebottendorf led 3,200 troops in five battalions. Argenteau counted 9,000 infantry and 340 cavalry in 11 battalions and two squadrons. These were scattered, with four battalions near Sassello, one at Acqui Terme, two at Mioglia, one at Dego, one at Cairo Montenotte, and two others nearby. Pittoni was ordered to move through the Bocchetta Pass north of Genoa while Beaulieu accompanied Sebottendorf's column through the Turchino Pass, northwest of Genoa.

On 10 April, the left wing of the Austrian army under Beaulieu, Sebottendorf, and Pittoni attacked Cervoni's French brigade in the Battle of Voltri. Cervoni made a fighting retreat and escaped intact to Savona down the coast. Beaulieu belatedly realized that he was now dangerously separated from his right wing under Feldmarschall-Leutnant Argenteau. He made arrangements to shift his left wing west to support his colleague and directed reinforcements from Lombardy to concentrate at Acqui.

The road net in the vicinity of the Montenotte battlefield resembled a triangle (Δ). The village of Altare, which was on the main east-west road from Savona to Ceva, lay at the bottom of the left leg, to the west. Altare was on the important Cadibona Pass road. The village of Madonna di Savona was located at the bottom of the right leg, to the east. Montenotte Superiore could be found at the top of the triangle. From Montenotte Superiore, the road continued north from the top of the Δ to Montenotte Inferiore. Three peaks were spaced at intervals along the right leg on the triangle. Starting from the top of the Δ, they were Monte San Giorgio, Monte Pra, and Monte Negino (or Monte Legino).

== Battle ==
=== Monte Negino ===
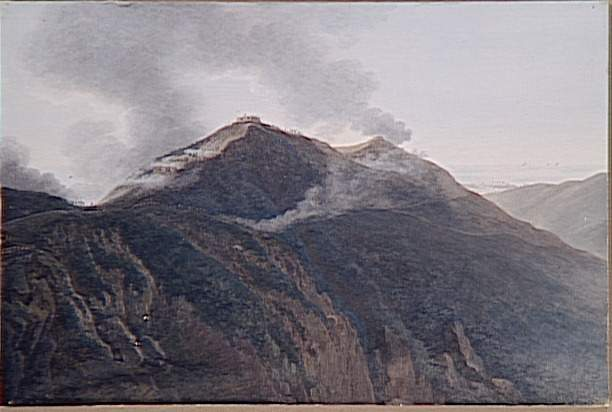
Attack on the redoubt of Monte-Legino by Giuseppe Pietro Bagetti (1764-1831)

Due to poor staff work, the attack of Argenteau's right wing did not begin until 11 April. On that day, the Austrians moved with 3,700 soldiers against a French position on Monte Negino. Argenteau led one battalion of Alvinczi Infantry Regiment Nr. 19 and two battalions of Archduke Anton Infantry Regiment Nr. 52 to a position near Montenotte Superiore. There, the Austrian rendezvoused with General-major Mathias Rukavina von Boynograd, who commanded one battalion each of Stein Infantry Regiment Nr. 50 and Pellegrini Infantry Regiment Nr. 49 plus three companies of Grenz infantry from the Gyulai Freikorps.

The Austrians began to press southeast down the right leg of the Δ, driving in the enemy outposts on Monte San Giorgio and Monte Pra. Colonel Henri-François Fornésy with about 1,000 French troops of the 17th Light Infantry Demi-Brigade held an old Austrian-built redoubt atop Monte Negino. These soldiers were joined by Colonel Antoine-Guillaume Rampon who assumed overall command. An additional 1,192 men of the 32nd Line from Madonna di Savona also arrived to help.

The road to Monte Negino followed the crest of the Apennines. Led by the Croats of the Gyulai Freikorps in skirmish order, the Austrians pressed their attacks. At a moment when the French troops were wavering, Rampon rallied them by making them swear to "conquer or die", according to one eyewitness. All the Austrian attacks failed and Rukavina was shot in the shoulder. Argenteau called a halt to operations about 4:00 PM. That evening, the Austrian commander sent a courier to Oberstleutnant Karl Leczeny in Sassello asking for reinforcements. Rampon estimated Austrian losses at 200 to 300, but they were probably closer to 100. The French reported 57 casualties.

=== Montenotte ===
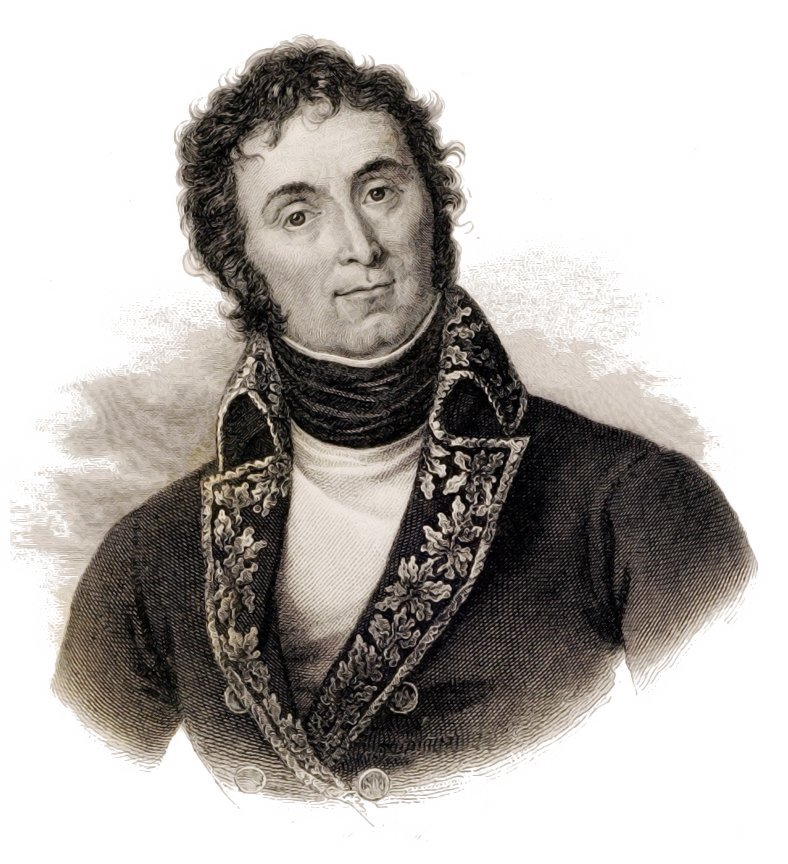
André Masséna

Argenteau's attack precipitated an immediate counteroffensive by Bonaparte, who moved General of Division André Masséna's two divisions from Savona to the area of the Cadibona Pass. Satisfied that Beaulieu was too far to the east to intervene effectively, Bonaparte was determined to crush Argenteau. He ordered General of Division Amédée Emmanuel Francois Laharpe's division to join Rampon's force, making a total of 7,000 soldiers at Monte Negino on the right leg of the Δ. Masséna marched from Altare, up the left leg of the Δ, with General of Brigade Philippe Romain Ménard's 4,000-man brigade. In order to reach their jumping off positions, the troops started at 2:00 AM and marched in a rain storm. General of Division Pierre Augereau's division and other units concentrated near the Cadibona Pass.

The 3rd battalion of the Terzi Infantry Regiment Nr. 16 marched all night to reach Montenotte at dawn. Argenteau deployed this unit, some Croats, and several detached companies from his other regiments to guard the Altare road. The rest of the Austrians still faced Monte Negino. One battalion of the Preiss Infantry Regiment Nr. 24 arrived in the area but was not committed to the next day's battle.

Fog shrouded the area at dawn on 12 April. When it cleared, several French cannons began firing from Monte Negino on the Austrians below them and Argenteau saw that he was confronted by a large force. Shortly afterward, Masséna's soldiers launched their attack on the weakly held Austrian right flank, swamping the defenders with superior numbers. Argenteau deployed the Stein and Pellegrini battalions under Oberstleutnant Nesslinger to hold the center and assigned the two Archduke Anton battalions to defend the left flank on Monte Pra. Then he took the Alvinczi battalion to the rescue of the 3rd Terzi battalion on his right flank.

While Masséna overwhelmed Argenteau's right, Laharpe fell on the Austrians defending Monte Pra. At first the Austrians conducted a stout defense. But Masséna's assault made such rapid progress that Argenteau ordered a retreat. The 3rd Terzi battalion was nearly destroyed and Nesslinger's two battalions were badly cut up. In the Austrian retreat from Montenotte Superiore, the Alvinczi battalion provided the rear guard. The battalion had to fight its way out, losing its color and many soldiers. Argenteau's men barely cleared out of Montenotte Inferiore before Masséna's and Laharpe's flanking forces converged on the hamlet. By 9:30 AM the battle was over.

== Results ==
The battle was General Bonaparte's first victory in the Montenotte campaign. By the next morning, Argenteau reported only 700 men with the colors. The rest were lost in combat or scattered. Historian Martin Boycott-Brown presented French losses as light; a sampling of reports show that the 32nd Line, 51st Line, 75th Line, and 17th Light lost 10, 8, 27, and 19 casualties, respectively. The Austrians admitted losing 166 killed, 114 wounded, and 416 missing, for a total of 696. Three historians assert that losses were more severe. Digby Smith wrote that the French suffered 800 killed, wounded, and missing out of a total of 14,000 troops and 18 guns. The Austrians went into the action with 9,000 men and lost 2,500 killed, wounded, and captured, with 12 guns lost. Most of Argenteau's casualties were prisoners. Gunther E. Rothenberg listed Austrian casualties as 2,500 and 12 guns out of 4,500 engaged, while French losses were 880 out of 10,000 available troops. David G. Chandler gave Austrian losses as 2,500 out of 6,000, but listed no French losses out of a total of 9,000.

A badly shaken Argenteau pulled his surviving soldiers back to cover Acqui, while other forces under Rukavina held Dego, about 7.5 kilometres (4.7 mi) to the northwest of Montenotte Superiore. Argenteau sent an alarming dispatch to Beaulieu stating that his command was "almost completely destroyed". Bonaparte issued orders to exploit his success by widening the gap between the Austrian and Sardinian armies by thrusting west toward Millesimo and north toward Dego. The next actions were the Battle of Millesimo on 13 April and the Second Battle of Dego on 14 and 15 April.

== See also ==
- Battle of Voltri, 10 April 1796
- Battle of Millesimo, 13 April 1796
- Second Battle of Dego, 14–15 April 1796
- Battle of Ceva, 16 April 1796
- Battle of Mondovì, 21 April 1796

== Notes ==
Footnotes

Citations
