= Battle of Faenza =

18th century Battle part of French Revolutionary wars

Coordinates: 44°19′N 11°48′E

- Part of the Italian campaign of 1796–1797 in the War of the First Coalition
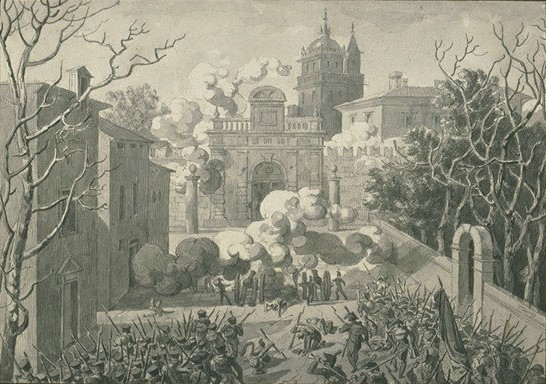
- The French army captures Faenza, 4 February 1797 by Nicolas-Antoine Taunay
| Date | 3 February 1797 |
| Location | Castel Bolognese, Faenza, Papal States |
| Result | French victory |

Belligerents
| French Republic | Papal States |

Commanders and leaders
| Claude-Victor Perrin | Michelangelo Colli |

Strength
| 9,000 | 7,000 |

Casualties and losses
| 100 killed or wounded | 800 killed or wounded 1,200 captured 14 artillery guns captured |

The Battle of Faenza, also known as the Battle of Castel Bolognese on 3 February 1797, saw 7,000 troops from the Papal Army commanded by Michelangelo Alessandro Colli-Marchi face 9,000 troops from the French Army under the command of Claude-Victor Perrin. The veteran French troops quickly overran the Papal army, inflicting disproportionate casualties. The town of Castel Bolognese was located on the banks of the Senio River 40 kilometres (25 mi) southeast of Bologna, and the city of Faenza was also nearby. The action took place during the War of the First Coalition, as part of the French Revolutionary Wars.

== Background ==
The Siege of Mantua came to an end on 2 February 1797, when Austrian Field Marshal Dagobert Sigismund von Würmser capitulated to the army of General Napoleon Bonaparte. Only 16,000 members of the garrison were capable of marching out as prisoners of war. Leaving General Jean-Mathieu-Philibert Sérurier to oversee the surrender, Bonaparte invaded Romagna, which formed part of the Papal States. The Papal army was led by Austrian Field Marshal Lieutenant Michelangelo Alessandro Colli-Marchi, a veteran of the Seven Years' War. Colli had served in the army of the Kingdom of Sardinia-Piedmont from 1793 to 1796 and had faced Bonaparte before in the disastrous Montenotte campaign. He was an intelligent and capable officer, but sometimes had to be carried on a stretcher due to old wounds.

The French Revolutionary Army was highly skilled, and fresh off recent successes in Italy. The Papal army, on the other hand, consisted of several regular “permanent regiments” reinforced by organized town or regionally trained militia battalions or cavalry squadrons called out in times of need. This was typical of many minor Italian state armies of this period including the Sardinian-Piedmontese army defeated by Bonaparte in 1796. The Papal army included several fortress garrison battalions, tasked with defending the state fortresses dotting the seacoast, ports and major towns. Through the 18th century the small Pontifical force had recruited its officer corps by commissioning individuals who were able to varying numbers of recruits - ranging from 100 men for a lieutenancy to 1,600 for a colonelcy. Training reflected an obsolete military culture with an emphasis on parade ground drill and spiritual exercises. The result in 1797 was a poorly resourced and unprofessionally led force, adequate for constabulary functions within the Papal States but not for facing the highly motivated and experienced French.

== Battle ==
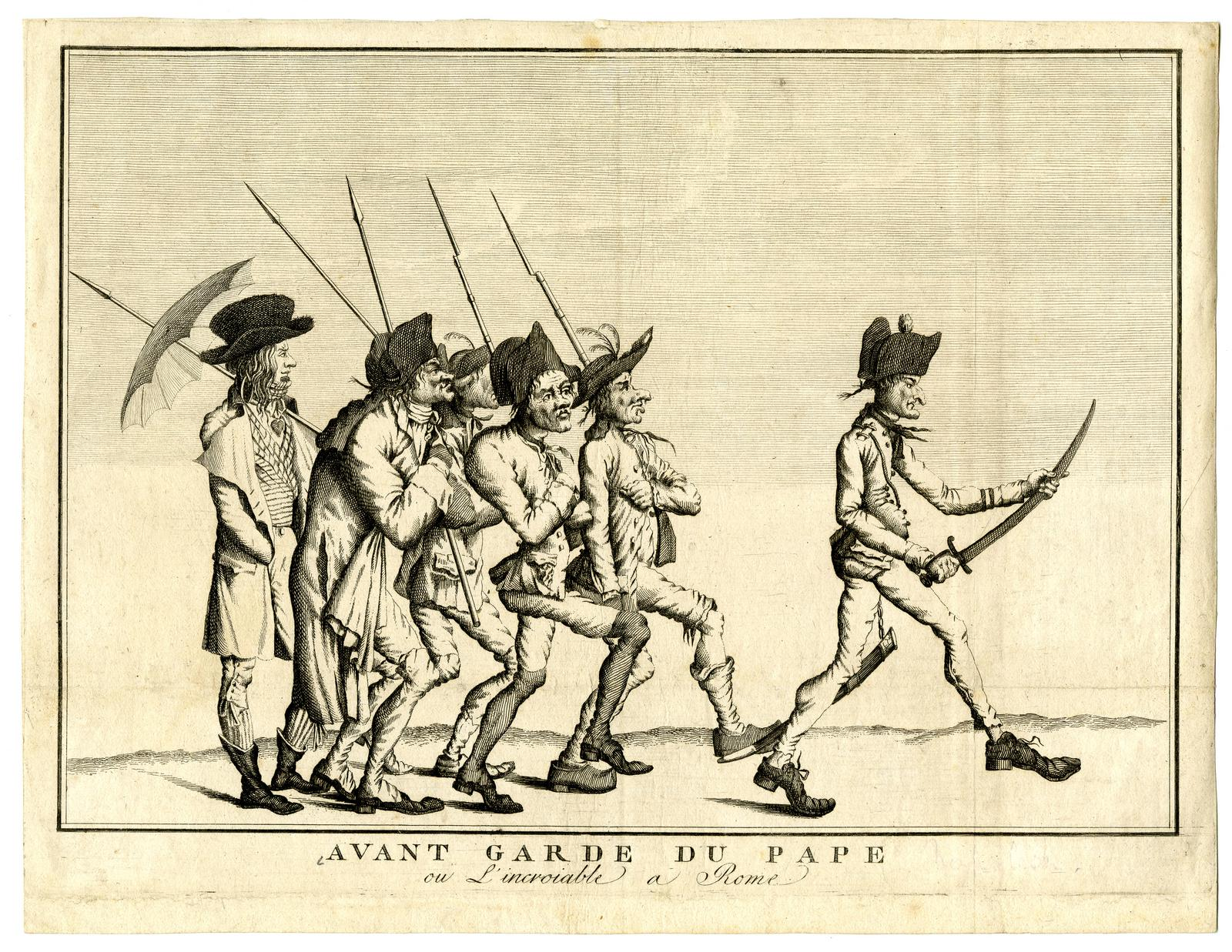
French satirical cartoon of the Papal Army before the battle

On 3 February, Victor sighted Colli's troops on the Senio at Castel Bolognese near Faenza. The Papal artillery began firing upon the advancing French forces, inflicting casualties. The French army then launched an assault over the Senio, dispersing the Papal infantry and cavalry and capturing 14 artillery guns. The French army made short work of their adversaries - for a loss of 100 casualties, Victor's soldiers inflicted 800 casualties on the Papal troops. In addition, the French captured 1,200 men, 14 artillery pieces, eight caissons, and eight colors. Victor's corps included a grenadier reserve commanded by General Jean Lannes.

== Aftermath ==
The port of Ancona surrendered to Victor on 9 February with its Papal garrison of 1,200 men and 120 artillery guns. There were no French casualties. By the Treaty of Tolentino on 19 February, Pope Pius VI was forced to deliver works of art, treasures, territory, and 30 million francs to France.

== In popular culture ==
The defeat was recorded not only by revolutionaries such as Francesco Saverio Salfi (who wrote a satirical pantomime about it), but also with sarcasm by the reactionary count Monaldo Leopardi and much later by his son, the poet Giacomo Leopardi.

== See also ==
- War of the First Coalition
- Michelangelo Alessandro Colli-Marchi
