= Battle of Ceva =

Battle of the Montenotte campaign

- Part of the Montenotte campaign
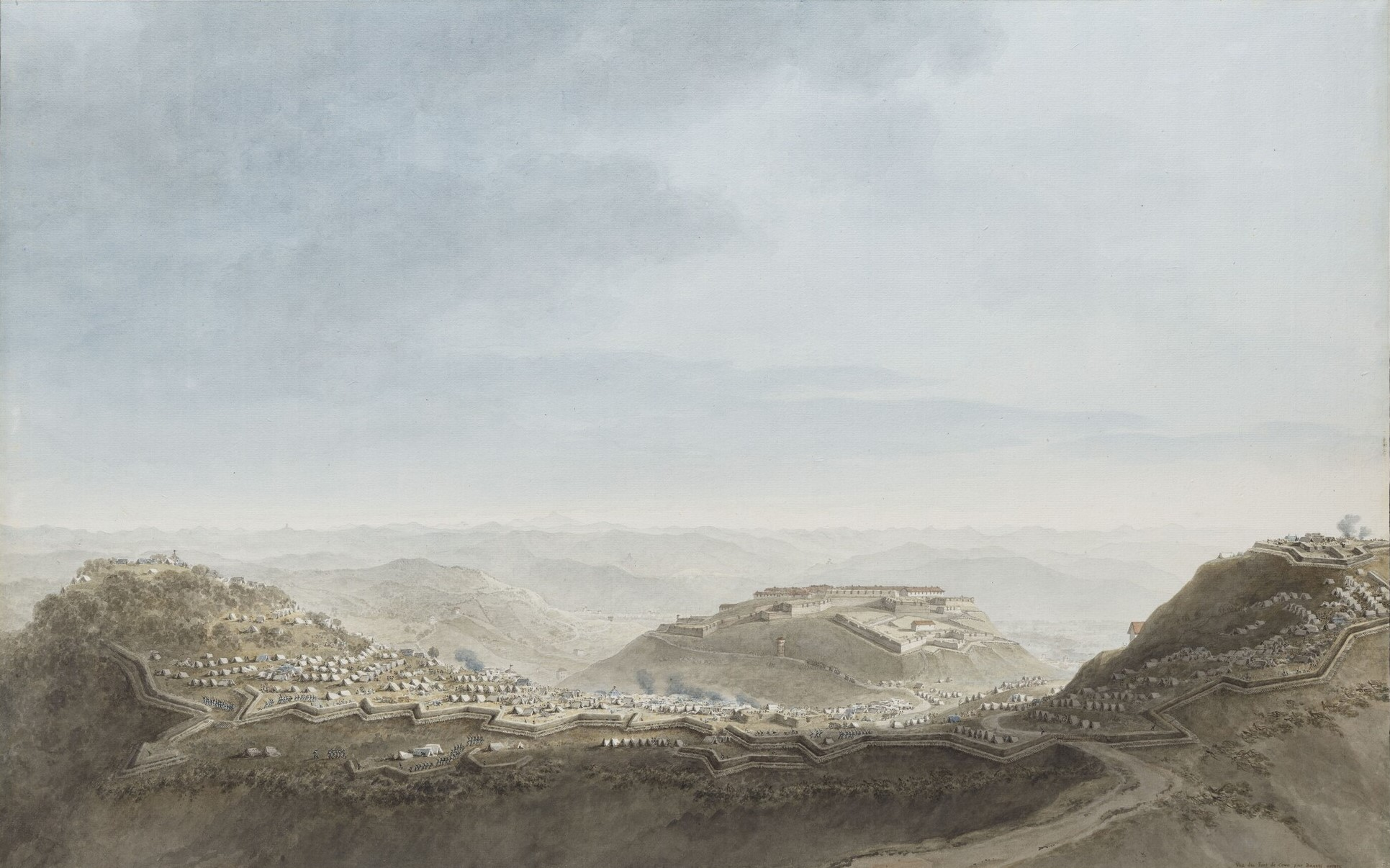
- View of the fort of Ceva, 16 April 1796; Giuseppe Pietro Bagetti, c. 1802–1806
Date	16 April 1796
Location	Ceva, Piedmont (present day Italy) 44°23′N 08°02′E
Result	French victory

Belligerents
(French First Republic) France	(Kingdom of Sardinia) Sardinia

Commanders and leaders
(French First Republic) Napoleon Bonaparte (French First Republic) Charles-Pierre Augereau	(Kingdom of Sardinia) Michelangelo Colli-Marchi (Kingdom of Sardinia) Giuseppe Felice, Count Vital

Strength
7,908	6,000

Casualties and losses
600	over 150

In the Battle of Ceva on 16 April 1796, troops of the French First Republic under General Pierre Augereau fought against part of the army of the Kingdom of Sardinia-Piedmont led by General Giuseppe Felice, Count Vital. Augereau assaulted the strong defensive position without success. At the direction of the Sardinian army commander, Feldmarschal-Leutnant Michelangelo Colli, Vital withdrew on the 17th in order to avoid being trapped by a second French division.

== Campaign ==
=== Operations ===
The Montenotte Campaign began on 10 April when Feldzeugmeister Johann Beaulieu's Austrian army attacked the extreme right flank of General of Division (MG) Napoleon Bonaparte's army near Genoa. Bonaparte launched a successful counterattack on 12 April at the Battle of Montenotte. On 13 April, MG Augereau's reinforced division defeated part of Colli's Sardinian army at the Battle of Millesimo. In the Second Battle of Dego on 14 and 15 April, the Austrians were defeated again. While Beaulieu reorganized his badly shaken army at Acqui Terme to the northeast, Bonaparte prepared to increase the separation between the Piedmontese from their Austrian allies by driving Colli farther to the west.

On 15 April, Colli assembled a force on high ground at Montezemolo in order to cover the fortress of Ceva. Meanwhile, MG Jean Sérurier's division advanced from Ormea north toward Ceva along the Tanaro River valley. Fearing he might be cut off from Ceva, the Piedmontese commander fell back to the fortress. Marching from the east, Augereau occupied Montezemolo early on 16 April, then his division moved north and west in an attempt to outflank Ceva.

=== Forces ===
See the Montenotte 1796 Campaign Order of Battle for a list of French, Austrian, and Sardinian units and organizations.

== Battle ==
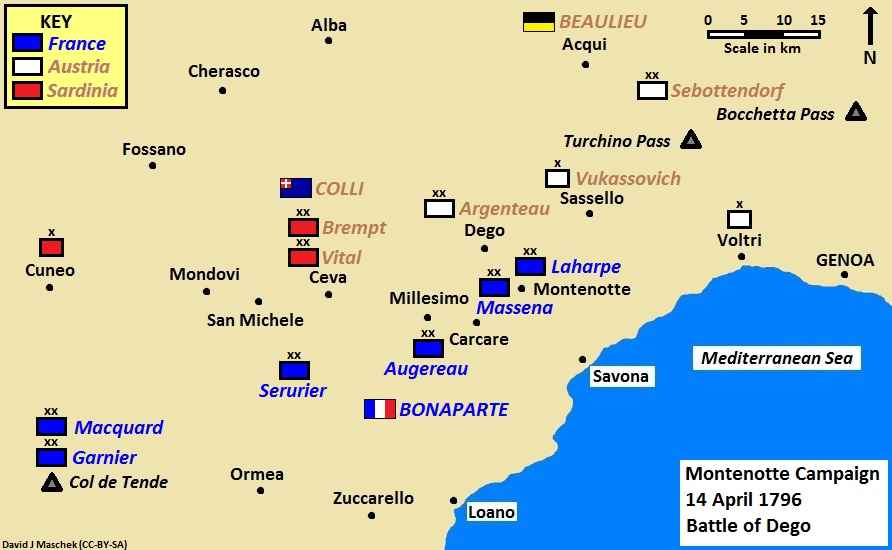
Montenotte Campaign, 14 April 1796

In 1796, the fortress loomed over the north side of Ceva. The Sardinians deployed atop a ridge that runs from the fortress north about seven kilometers to the hamlet of La Pedaggera, where the modern SP 661 and SP 32 intersect. Sardinian and Austrian engineers had fortified the ridge, which overlooks the Bovina stream, with a series of redoubts. General Brempt held the north end of the line with several Piedmontese battalions plus the Austrian Belgioso Infantry Regiment # 44. Vital defended the south end of the line with nine battalions, and General Count di Tornaforte commanded the three battalions in the fortress.

Augereau's division formed several columns under General of Brigade (BG) Martial Beyrand and BG Barthélemy Joubert. Two French columns pressed home their attacks on Brempt's left flank while one column assaulted Vital's position near Mondoni in the center. The Sardinians repelled all attacks on the ridge.

That evening Sérurier camped within sight of Ceva, threatening to turn the southern flank of the Sardinian line. On the northern flank, Brempt reported that he might be cut off if attacked again. Though they had won a defensive success, the mood of the Piedmontese generals was gloomy and they recommended a retreat. That night, Colli held a council of war in which he decided to withdraw most of the army west behind the Corsaglia River, leaving Tornaforte with one battalion to hold Ceva fortress. Some units were sent northwest to Cherasco to prevent the French from cutting between Colli and the Piedmontese capital of Turin.

== Result ==
Augereau occupied the abandoned Sardinian positions on 17 April. Bonaparte decided to mask the fortress with a force under BG Jean Rusca and continue to press the Piedmontese back on Cuneo. The French lost about 600 men killed and wounded. Brempt reported a loss of 150 while Vital's casualties are unknown. The Sardinians won another rear guard action at San Michele Mondovi on 19 April. This was followed by the decisive French victory at the Battle of Mondovì on 21 April.
