= Michelangelo Alessandro Colli-Marchi =

Sardinian General

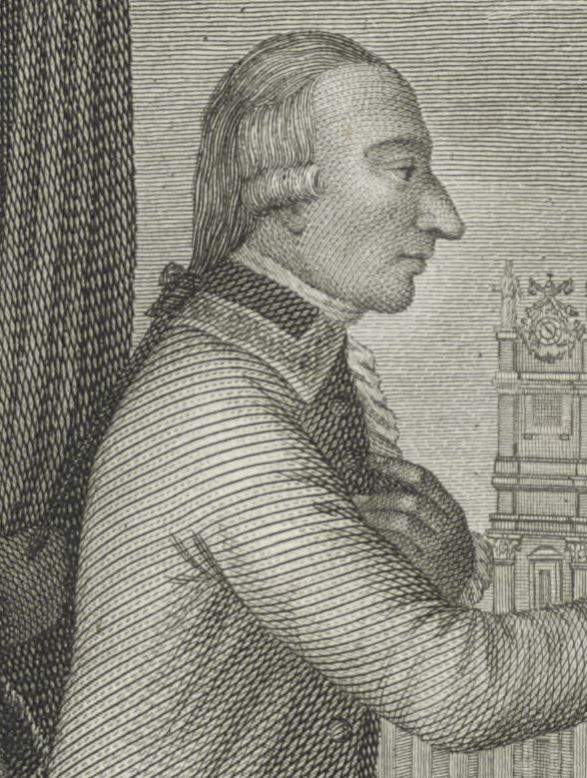
- Michelangelo Alessandro Colli-Marchi
- Born: 1738; Vigevano or Milan
- Died: 22 December 1808 (aged 70); Florence
- Military career
- Allegiance: Austrian Empire; Kingdom of Sardinia; Papal States; Kingdom of Naples
- Rank: Feldmarschall-Leutnant
- Conflicts: Seven Years' War; Battle of Prague; Battle of Torgau; War of the Bavarian Succession; Austro-Turkish War (1788–1791); Siege of Belgrade; War of the First Coalition; First Battle of Saorgio; Second Battle of Saorgio; Battle of Ceva; Battle of Mondovì; Battle of Borghetto; Battle of Faenza
- Awards: Order of Saints Maurice and Lazarus

Michelangelo Alessandro Colli-Marchi or Michelangelo da Vigevano or Michael Colli (1738, Milan – 22 December 1808, Florence) entered the Habsburg Austrian army as a commissioned officer and became a general officer after fighting in the Seven Years' War, War of the Bavarian Succession, and Austro-Turkish War. During the War of the First Coalition, he was loaned to the Kingdom of Sardinia-Piedmont for three years. In 1796, his army was defeated by Napoleon Bonaparte in a swift campaign that knocked Sardinia-Piedmont out of the war. In early 1797, he was given command of the army of the Papal States, but his troops were defeated at Faenza.

== Early career ==
Michelangelo Alessandro Colli-Marchi was born in either Vigevano or Milan in 1738. His father Giuseppe Antonio Colli (1698–1766) had represented Vigevano with the Habsburg government in Milan and was granted a title of nobility. Well educated, Colli was commissioned as an Fähnrich (Ensign) at the age of 18 in the Pallavacini Infantry Regiment Nr. 15. He transferred to the General Staff and served at the Battle of Prague in 1757. He fought during the Seven Years' War with distinction. He was promoted to Unterleutnant in December 1757, and to Leutnant and Hauptmann (Captain) in 1758. He was wounded at the Battle of Torgau in 1760.

When the General Staff was reduced, Colli transferred to the Baden Infantry Regiment Nr. 23 on 1 May 1764. He received the noble title Freiherr in 1764. He transferred again to the Caprara Infantry Regiment Nr. 48 with the rank of Oberstleutnant (Lieutenant Colonel) on 1 November 1768. He led a battalion in the main army during the War of the Bavarian Succession. Colli was promoted Oberst (Colonel) on 1 May 1779 and assigned to the Milan garrison. During the Austro-Turkish War he led his troops in battle at Osijek (Esseg) in December 1787. His bravery was noted in the capture of Šabac. He received promotion to Generalmajor on 26 December 1788 to date from 30 November 1788. He fought at the Siege of Belgrade where he was badly wounded. He became the vice-commander of Josefstadt fortress in 1789.

== Italian service ==
=== 1792–1795 ===
Though it was obvious that the French First Republic would invade the Kingdom of Sardinia-Piedmont, King Victor Amadeus III was unable to conclude a defense treaty with Habsburg Austria until 22 September 1792. By then it was too late because two days later, the French occupied Chambéry. Having lost the Duchy of Savoy and County of Nice thanks to the incompetence of his generals, Victor Amadeus asked the Austrians to provide his kingdom with an overall commander. On 21 December 1792, Feldzeugmeister Joseph Nikolaus de Vins was selected to fill the post. At about the same time, Colli and Generalmajor Eugène-Guillaume Argenteau were also loaned to the Sardinian kingdom. De Vins imposed a very awkward chain of command. He intended to direct operations from the capital at Turin. Meanwhile, Colli was ordered to obey his superior, Charles-François Thaon, Count of Saint-André, but only if de Vins approved. Unfortunately, Colli and Saint-André did not like each other. Also, the Piedmontese officer corps detested de Vins' chief of staff Argenteau.

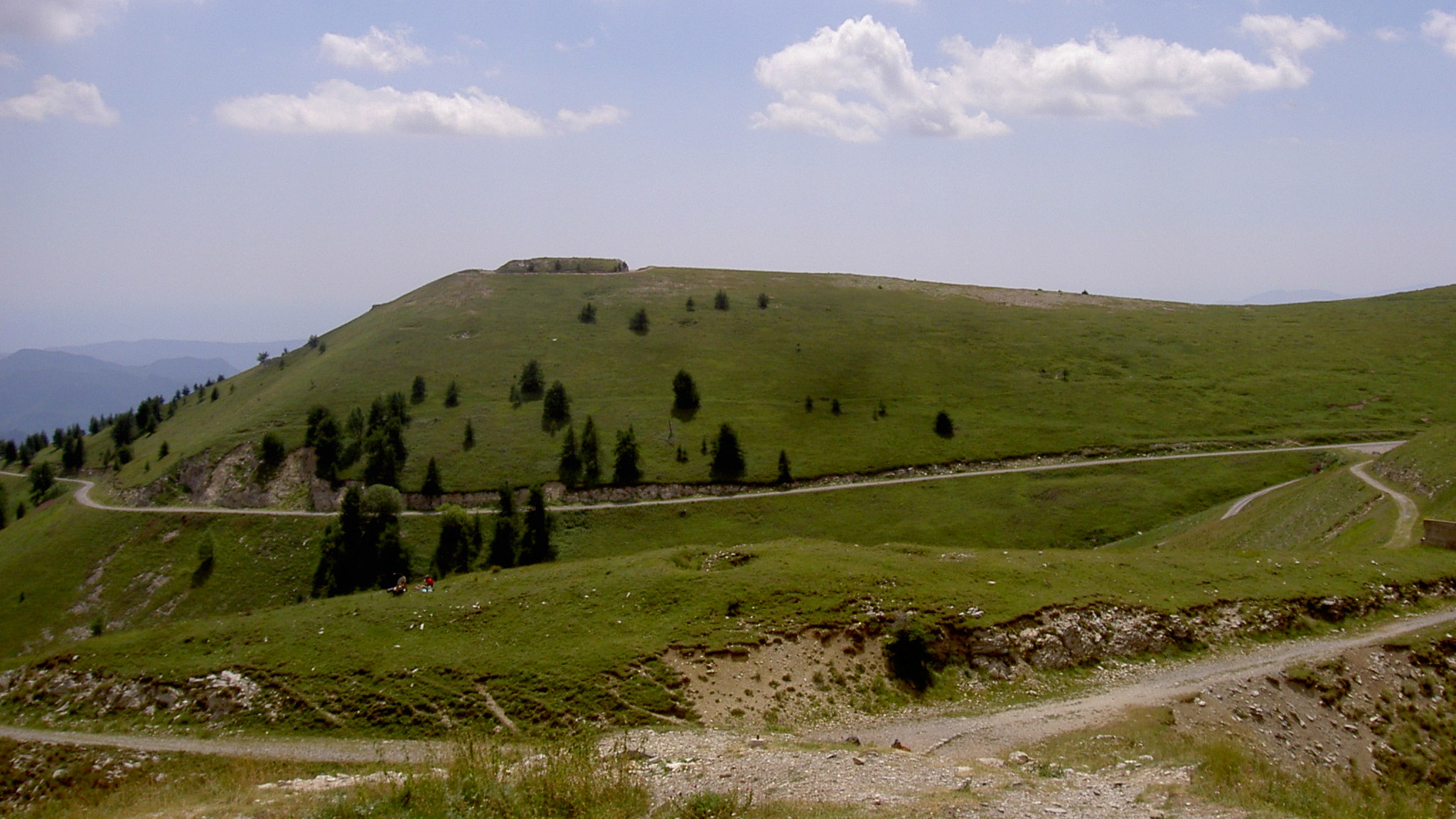
Massif de l'Authion

The Piedmontese defenses in the south were based on a 20 mi (32 km) long line of peaks running from Roquebillière in the west through the Col de Raus, Authion massif, Colle Basse, and Saorge (Saorgio). This line was based on defensive redoubts. From Saorge, the line curved to the northeast toward the Colle Ardente and Monte Saccarello. In May and June 1793, the French army commander Gaspard Jean-Baptiste Brunet began a series of attacks on these positions which culminated in the First Battle of Saorgio on 12 June. The French were repulsed with losses of 280 killed and 1,252 wounded. Saint-André commanded the sector, but Colli was the local commander who defeated the French attacks on 8 and 12 June. Another French attack on Authion was defeated at the end of July 1793. Historian Digby Smith named Colli as the Piedmontese commander in the 12 June engagement. Colli was promoted Feldmarschall-Leutnant on 29 December 1793.

In the Second Battle of Saorgio in April 1794, Pierre Jadart Dumerbion's French army turned the eastern flank of the Saorge defenses which were held by Colli and 16,000 Piedmontese soldiers. With 20,000 men, André Massena thrust east along the coast, then turned north. Massena drove off forces under Argenteau and captured Ormea on 17 April. Massena then turned west and stormed the Colle Ardente. The Saorge position was outflanked on its left and attacked in front by the divisions of Jean-Mathieu-Philibert Sérurier and François Macquard. Colli's troops were driven out of Saorge on 28 April and the French seized the Col de Tende.

On 22 November 1795, de Vins became too sick to command and was replaced by Feldzeugmeister Olivier, Count of Wallis. The next day, the French army under Barthélemy Louis Joseph Schérer attacked to open the Battle of Loano. The French division under Sérurier attacked Colli on the Allied right flank, but after fierce fighting was repulsed by the Piedmontese. Meanwhile, the Austrians in the center and on the left flank were overwhelmed by the French divisions of Massena and Charles-Pierre Augereau, losing 3,500 killed and wounded, 4,000 prisoners, and 48 guns. However, the victory was not exploited because the French troops were badly supplied and Schérer's nerve failed him. At some point after Loano, Colli was appointed to overall command of Sardinia's army.

=== 1796 ===
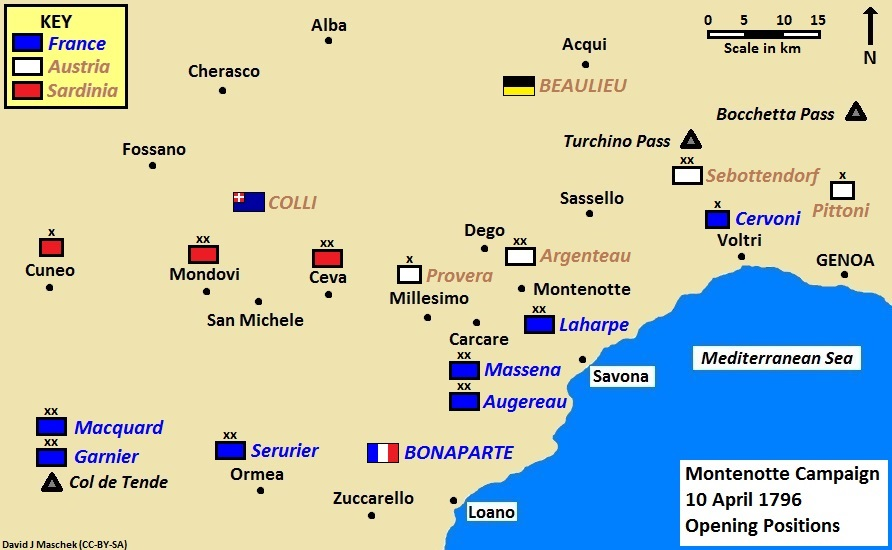
Bonaparte severed the link between the Austrian and Sardinian armies near Dego, then turned west against Colli. The decisive battle was fought at Mondovì and peace was signed at Cherasco.

Colli was described by his Piedmontese chief of staff C. A. Costa de Beauregard as, "of medium height and very thin; an aquiline nose, a very small graceful mouth, and very lively, big blue eyes, gave him a very remarkable face. He joined to this much natural intelligence and great finesse". In early 1796, Costa noted that Colli felt that he was in an awkward situation, working for two masters, Austria and Sardinia. Costa remarked that Colli was not consumed by the greed for material wealth that other generals displayed. Sometimes Colli's war wounds caused him to be carried around on a stretcher. In mid-March 1796, the 70-year-old Johann Peter Beaulieu was promoted Feldzeugmeister and appointed to replace Wallis as commander of the Austrian army in Italy. Beaulieu and Colli were old friends.

Unfortunately, relations between the Sardinian kingdom and their Austrian allies were strained. The Austrian government gave Beaulieu secret instructions warning him that the Piedmontese might drop out of the war or even change sides. So, despite Colli being a personal friend, Beaulieu could not confide in him, nor could the two generals work out a coherent allied strategy. Beaulieu proceeded to mass his troops to attack across the Bocchetta Pass toward Genoa. This proved to be a mistake. Colli worried that while Beaulieu's troops were involved near Genoa, the French might attack the Piedmontese army instead.

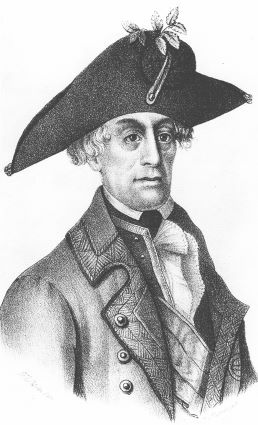
Johann Beaulieu

At the start of the Montenotte campaign, Colli commanded 20,000 Piedmontese troops and 5,000 Austrians in the so-called Auxiliary Corps. Colli's troops were camped near Mondovì and Ceva. Beaulieu led 32,000 infantry, 5,000 cavalry, and 148 guns, not counting the Auxiliary Corps, but the number of soldiers present for duty was probably less. On 10 April 1796, Beaulieu attacked the French at Voltri with about 7,000 Austrians. Farther west, Argenteau's Austrian division had 9,000 infantry and 340 cavalry. They were opposed by Napoleon Bonaparte's army, in which Massena led two divisions numbering 8,614 and 9,526 men, Augereau's division counted 10,117 men, and Sérurier's division mustered 9,448 men. Of these, the French at Voltri counted 5,000 men.

The Austrian victory at the Battle of Voltri was rapidly followed by the defeats of Argenteau's division at the Battle of Montenotte and the Second Battle of Dego. The Battle of Millesimo cost the French 700 casualties, but ended when the survivors of the 988 Austrian-Sardinian force surrendered on 14 April. Colli's army fended off a French attack in the Battle of Ceva but withdrew west that night. At this time, Colli received information that Beaulieu intended to retreat to the north. In a clash at San Michele Mondovì on 19 April, Colli's Piedmontese again repulsed a French attack. However, Colli called a council of war at which it was decided to retreat to Mondovì. The French launched a rapid pursuit that overran Colli's defenses and routed his army in the Battle of Mondovì on 21 April. The next day, Victor Amadeus asked for an armistice and notified Colli. The armistice was signed at 2:00 am on 28 April at Cherasco. Historian Martin Boycott-Brown wrote, "If the Austrians had chosen to concentrate closer to the Piedmontese positions, as Colli had wanted, it would have been less easy for Bonaparte to effect their separation".

The Armistice of Cherasco released Colli from his obligations to Victor Amadeus, so he joined Beaulieu's army and was assigned to guard the upper Ticino River with 2 infantry battalions and 2 cavalry squadrons. After the French outflanked Beaulieu, Colli was instructed to retreat through Milan and leave a garrison there. His small force crossed the Adda River and rejoined Beaulieu's army on 10 May 1796. Colli commanded Beaulieu's left wing at Goito during the Battle of Borghetto on 30 May. Under his command were 2,583 infantry and 80 cavalry under Generalmajor Mathias Rukavina von Boynograd, 518 Austrian Uhlans, and 377 Kingdom of Naples dragoons. As soon as Colli found that the French had seized Valeggio sul Mincio, he marched there with his forces. However, when Beaulieu ordered a retreat to the Tyrol, Colli sent Rukavina's brigade into the fortress of Mantua as directed and rejoined Beaulieu with his cavalry. This action ended Colli's tenure with the Austrian army of Italy.

== Later career ==
On 21 January 1797, Bonaparte sent Claude-Victor Perrin on an expedition against the Papal States with 4,000 infantry and 600 cavalry. Victor was joined by some newly recruited Italian allied troops. Pope Pius VI thought that the French army was weakened after the Battle of Arcole, so he decided to resist the French. Colli was in command of the army of the Papal States, but he never left Rome. Victor dispersed the papal forces at the Battle of Faenza (Castel Bolognese) on 3 February 1797, then easily captured Ancona on 9 February. The French hoped to appropriate the valuables stored at the House of Loretto, but Colli had already removed most of them to a safer location. On 19 February, the pope was forced to sign the Treaty of Tolentino at an exorbitant cost in specie and jewels.

Later, Colli served in the Kingdom of Naples army. From 5 March 1804 to 10 December 1807 he served as an Austrian Envoy extraordinary and Minister plenipotentiary in Etruria. He died at Florence on 22 December 1808.
