= Battle of Mondovì =

Battle of the Montenotte campaign

- Part of the Montenotte campaign
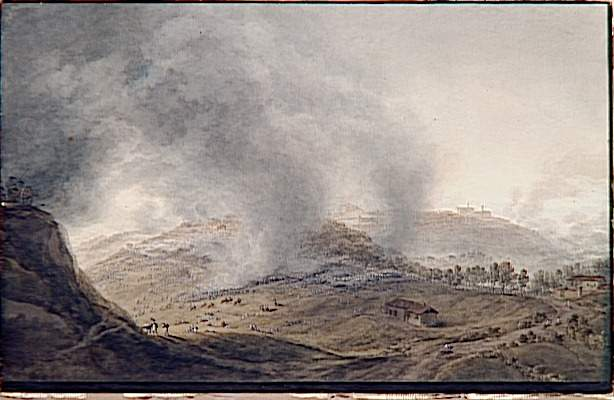
- View of the Battle of Mondovi; Giuseppe Pietro Bagetti, c. 1802–1806
Date	20–21 April 1796
Location	Mondovì, Piedmont, Italy 44.3833°N 7.8167°E
Result	French victory: Armistice of Cherasco

Belligerents
(French First Republic) French Republic	(Kingdom of Sardinia) Sardinia

Commanders and leaders
(French First Republic) Napoleon Bonaparte (French First Republic) Charles-Pierre Augereau (French First Republic) André Masséna (French First Republic) Jean Sérurier (French First Republic) Henri Christian Michel de Stengel (DOW)	(Kingdom of Sardinia) Michelangelo Colli-Marchi (Kingdom of Sardinia) Jean-Gaspard Dichat de Toisinge †

Strength
17,500	13,000

Casualties and losses
600 killed, wounded or captured	1,600 killed, wounded or captured 8 cannons lost

The Battle of Mondovì was fought on 21 April 1796 between the French army of Napoleon Bonaparte and the army of the Kingdom of Sardinia-Piedmont led by Michelangelo Alessandro Colli-Marchi. The French victory meant that they had put the Ligurian Alps behind them, while the plains of Piedmont lay before them. A week later, King Victor Amadeus III sued for peace, taking his kingdom out of the First Coalition. The defeat of their Sardinian ally wrecked the Austrian Habsburg strategy and led to the loss of northwest Italy to the French First Republic.

== Campaign ==
=== Operations ===
This was the last battle of the Montenotte Campaign in which Bonaparte's Army of Italy thrust between Feldmarschall-Leutnant Colli's 21,000-man Austro-Sardinian army and Feldzeugmeister Johann Beaulieu's 28,000-strong Austrian army. In the initial battles, Bonaparte savaged Beaulieu's army and drove it northeast. Then the French general turned his main attack to the west against the Piedmontese. Colli conducted a series of well-fought rear guard actions, including the Battle of Millesimo on 13 April and the Battle of Ceva on 16 April. Nevertheless, Bonaparte drove the Sardinian army relentlessly westward toward the fortress of Cuneo and the plains of Piedmont. On 18 April, Colli retreated into a strong position behind the Corsaglia River.

=== Forces ===
See Montenotte 1796 campaign order of battle for a list of French, Austrian, and Sardinian organizations and units that fought in the campaign.

=== Geography ===
The Corsaglia runs in a northeasterly direction until it flows into the northwest-flowing Tanaro River near the town of Lesegno. In April the streams were swollen by snow-melt and rain which rendered them generally unfordable. On the west bank are hills that dominate the river crossings. These heights are Madonna della Cassette in the north, La Bicocca in the center, and Buon Gesù in the south near the town of San Michele Mondovi. The Ellero River and the town of Mondovì lie five kilometers to the west of the Corsaglia.

=== San Michele Mondovi ===
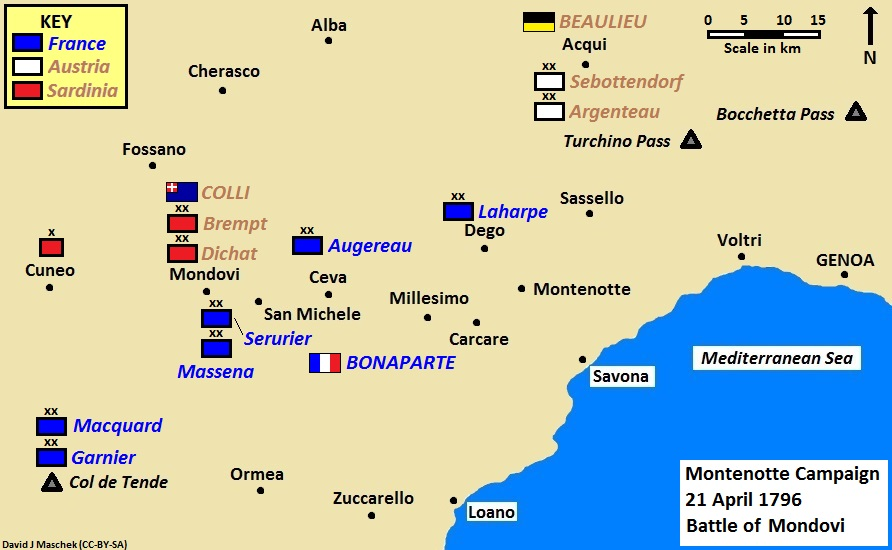
Montenotte Campaign, 21 April 1796

Colli appointed General Jean-Gaspard Dichat de Toisinge with 8,000 troops and 15 cannon to hold the position. Bonaparte planned to send the division of MG Jean-Mathieu-Philibert Sérurier in a head-on assault against San Michele while MG Pierre Augereau's division crossed the Tanaro to flank the position from the north. MG André Masséna's division hovered in the mountains north of Ceva, threatening a northwestward lunge to cut Colli off from Turin. MG Henri Christian Michel de Stengel was ordered to march the cavalry to support Sérurier. The division of MG Amedee Emmanuel Francois Laharpe watched the Austrians who were regrouping at Acqui Terme.

Augereau's men failed to get across the river due to high water and five well-placed cannon. The Piedmontese repulsed Serurier's morning attack on the San Michele bridge with loss. Later, some skirmishers of General of Brigade (BG) Jean Joseph Guieu's brigade found an unguarded footbridge to the south near the hamlet of Torre Mondovì. Soon Guieu's men crossed in strength and began rolling up the Sardinian right flank. The defenders of San Michele broke for the rear, allowing BG Pascal Antoine Fiorella's troops to cross the bridge and occupy the town. In the confusion, Colli was nearly taken prisoner. Dichat was caught, but he escaped by bribing his captor.

The hungry, badly-paid, and poorly disciplined French troops immediately ran wild in the town, stealing food and pillaging the houses. A company of Swiss grenadiers in Sardinian pay, noting that the French were out of control, retook part of the town. Colli organized a major counterattack in the early afternoon which drove Sérurier's division out of San Michele, though Guieu managed to hold on to his small bridgehead. One authority estimates that the French suffered about 600 casualties while the Piedmontese lost 300.

On the 20th, Bonaparte brought Masséna's division forward while the other troops rested. To the northeast, Beaulieu still hesitated to mount a major effort to help his ally. On the night of 20 April, Colli withdrew his army from the Corsaglia position, intending to fall back behind the Ellero River at Mondovì. After destroying the bridges and leaving their campfires burning, Colli's soldiers slipped away during the evening. At midnight, Bonaparte discovered that his enemy had decamped and mounted a rapid pursuit, using a ford discovered by some scouts.

== Battle ==
The next morning, Sérurier's advance struck the Sardinian rearguard on the heights of Buon Gesù and drove it back on the town of Vicoforte. Sérurier formed his conscripts into three heavy columns and covered them with his more experienced soldiers in skirmish order. Then, putting himself at the head of the central column, he led a charge against the Sardinians with Masséna's division following behind.

The speed of the French attack did not allow Colli to deploy his troops properly, nor were there any prepared defenses. A few of the Sardinian units panicked and fled, leaving gaps in the line. Fiorella's and Guieu's brigades, supported by BG Elzéar Dommartin's brigade of Masséna's division, converged on Vicoforte and captured it. The Sardinians at La Bicocca held firm until Dichat was killed, then they joined the disorderly retreat. Bonaparte's cavalry commander Stengel took 300 dragoons across the Ellero, but Colonel Chaffardon counterattacked with 250 Sardinian dragoons of the Regiment "Dragoni di Sua Maestà" and drove the French back. Stengel was mortally wounded in the melee.

When the French arrived at Mondovì, the governor managed to stall the pursuers for a time with negotiations, but he surrendered the town when fired on at about 6 PM. Bonaparte forced the municipal authorities to provide large contributions of food to his hungry soldiers, so the town was not sacked.

== Results ==
According to historian Gunther E. Rothenberg, Bonaparte's forces lost 600 killed and wounded out of 17,500. The Piedmontese lost 8 cannons and 1,600 men killed, wounded, and captured out of 13,000. Digby Smith lists a strength of 15,000 for the French and 11,000 for the Sardinians, but gives no losses. A third source lists 1,000 total French casualties versus 800 Piedmontese killed and wounded, plus an additional 800 to 1,500 captured. Bonaparte ordered a vigorous pursuit of the defeated Sardinians. On the evening of 23 April, Colli asked for an armistice, but the French general ordered his troops to continue their advance. Bonaparte demanded that Sardinia hand over the fortresses of Cuneo, Ceva, and either Alessandria or Tortona as the price of peace. On 28 April, the Sardinian government finally signed the Armistice of Cherasco, which effectively knocked the Kingdom of Sardinia out of the First Coalition. The next action was the Battle of Fombio in early May.
