= Johann Peter Beaulieu =

Walloon military officer (1725–1819)

Johann Peter de Beaulieu
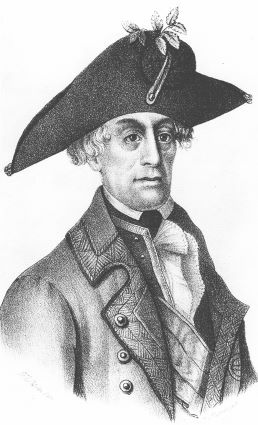
- Johann Peter de Beaulieu
- Born: 26 October 1725; Lathuy, Jodoigne, Austrian Netherlands
- Died: 22 December 1819 (aged 94); Linz, Austria
- Military career
- Allegiance: Habsburg monarchy
- Branch: Infantry
- Service years: 1743–1796
- Rank: Feldzeugmeister
- Conflicts: Seven Years' War; Brabant Revolution; French Revolutionary Wars; • Battle of Quiévrain (1792); • Battle of Courtrai (1793); • Battle of Arlon (1794); • Battle of Voltri; • Battle of Fombio; • Battle of Borghetto
- Awards: Military Order of Maria Theresa, KC (1760), CC (1790), GC (1794)
- Other work: Inhaber Infantry Regiment Nr. 31 (1792–1794); Inhaber, Infantry Regiment Nr. 58 (1794–1819)

Johann Peter de Beaulieu, also Jean Pierre de Beaulieu (26 October 1725, in Lathuy, Brabant, Belgium – 22 December 1819), was a Walloon military officer. He joined the Habsburg army and fought against the Prussians during the Seven Years' War. A cultured man, he later battled Belgian rebels and earned promotion to general officer. During the French Revolutionary Wars he fought against the French First Republic and attained high command. In 1796, a young Napoleon Bonaparte won some of his first victories against an army led by Beaulieu. He retired and was the Proprietor (Inhaber) of an Austrian infantry regiment until his death.

== Early career ==
Born in Lathuy Castle, Jodoigne in the Austrian Netherlands (now Walloon Brabant, Belgium) in 1725, Beaulieu joined the Habsburg army in 1743 and fought in the War of the Austrian Succession. During the Seven Years' War he served first as an infantry officer and later on the staff of Feldmarschall Leopold Joseph von Daun. Beaulieu was wounded in the Battle of Kolin and also fought at the battles of Leuthen, Hochkirch, Maxen, and other actions. He received the Knight's Cross of the Military Order of Maria Theresa in 1760. "As a young man, his bold and fiery character combined with his great energy and constant activity had made him well-suited to the military life."

Beaulieu married Marie-Louise Robert in 1763; in 1776 she died. He was artistically inclined. He designed improvements for several palaces, designed and laid out a formal garden, and collected art work. He became a General-Major in 1789 and helped crush the Brabant Revolt against Austrian rule, though his only son was killed during the uprising. For his services, in 1790, the Habsburg army promoted him to Feldmarschall-Leutnant and awarded him the Commander's Cross of the Military Order of Maria Theresa.

== French Revolutionary Wars ==
=== 1792–1795 ===
In the years from 1792 to 1795, Beaulieu fought against France in the Flanders Campaign and later on the Rhine. On 28–29 April 1792, he won one of the first engagements of the War of the First Coalition at Mons. With 5,000 Austrian troops and 18 artillery pieces, he defeated Armand Louis de Gontaut, Duke of Biron's 7,500 soldiers and 36 guns, inflicting 400 casualties for a loss of only 30. He bested the French in another clash at Harelbeke on 23 June. On this occasion he led a corps of 11,050 men and 10 guns against 7,000 Frenchmen and 6 guns from Nicolas Luckner's army. At the unsuccessful siege of Lille from 25 September to 8 October, he commanded a division in the army of Duke Albert of Saxe-Teschen. His command included three and a half infantry battalions under Karl von Biela, nine cavalry squadrons led by Ludwig Franz Civalart d'Happoncourt, eight squadrons commanded by Charles Eugene, Prince of Lambesc, and Karl Friedrich von Lindenau's sappers and pontonniers.

On 6 November 1792, Beaulieu led Saxe-Teschen's left wing at the Battle of Jemappes. His command included one battalion of the Hohenlohe Infantry Regiment Nr. 17, two battalions of the Stuart Infantry Regiment Nr. 18, five companies of the Serbian Freikorps, and one squadron of the Blankenstein Hussar Regiment Nr. 16. He led a force during the successful defense of Trier in December 1792. With 5,000 troops, including five battalions and four squadrons, he repulsed an 8,000-man French attack on Wervik on 28 August 1793. He participated in the Siege of Le Quesnoy from 28 August to 13 September. In this successful action in which 5,000 French soldiers were killed or captured, he was subordinate to François Sébastien de Croix de Clerfayt.

On 26 June 1794, he commanded the fifth column in the Battle of Fleurus. This powerful column consisted of 16 battalions, 22 squadrons, and 18 guns. After the defeat at Fleurus, Prince Josias of Coburg, who disliked Beaulieu, dismissed him. From 1792 to 1794, he was Proprietor (Inhaber) of Infantry Regiment Nr. 31, a Hungarian unit. He succeeded Joseph Orocz as Inhaber and was succeeded in turn by Johann Andreas Benjowsky. On 7 July 1794, Beaulieu received the Grand Cross of the Military Order of Maria Theresa.

=== 1796 ===
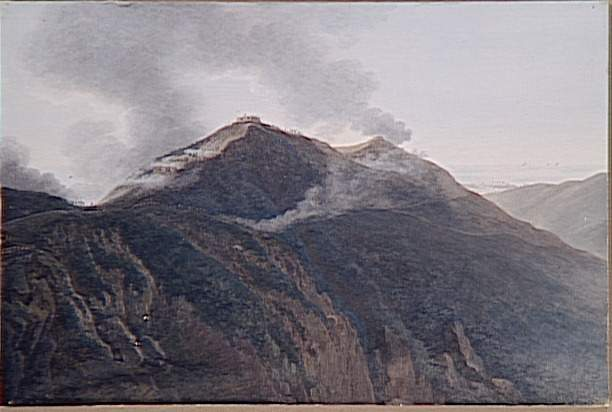
Battle of Montenotte. "Attack on the redoubt of Monte Legino" by Giuseppe Bagetti (1764–1831)

On 4 March 1796, Beaulieu was promoted to Feldzeugmeister and transferred to command the 32,000-strong Habsburg army in northern Italy. He faced a French army with a newly created commander, Napoleon Bonaparte. Together with a 17,000-man army from the Kingdom of Piedmont-Sardinia, Beaulieu's task was to defend the crest of the Ligurian Alps and the northern Apennines in order to keep the French armies from entering the Po River basin of northern Italy. Secret orders from the Austrian government warned him that his Piedmontese ally might soon change sides, and was not to be trusted. These instructions prevented Beaulieu from effectively cooperating with the Sardinian commander of the Piedmontese forces, Michelangelo Colli-Marchi, a personal friend.

In the event, Bonaparte outmaneuvered Beaulieu during the Montenotte Campaign. After the French mauled his right wing in battles at Montenotte and Dego, Beaulieu watched in stunned inactivity as the French knocked Sardinia out of the war at the battles of Millesimo, Ceva, and Mondovì. Beaulieu withdrew his army behind the Po, hoping the river would stop the French advance. But Bonaparte marched west to cross the river near Piacenza, behind the Austrian left flank. The French defeated Anton Lipthay de Kisfalud at the Battle of Fombio on 7 to 9 May 1796. Hastily, Beaulieu withdrew his army to the east, dropping off a force under Karl Philipp Sebottendorf to hold the bridge over the Adda River at Lodi. Bonaparte seized the bridge in the Battle of Lodi on 10 May and drove Sebottendorf back with losses of 2,000 casualties and 14 guns. The Austrians abandoned Duchy of Milan and pulled back to the Mincio River. A minor defeat at the Battle of Borghetto on 30 May forced Beaulieu to abandon the Mincio line and retreat north to the Tyrol. Before leaving the Po valley, he left a strong garrison in the fortress of Mantua. The Siege of Mantua would become the focus of many battles during the remainder of 1796. During the retreat, Beaulieu relieved Lipthay from command of the rearguard for retreating too quickly. Thomas Graham, a British observer with the Habsburg army, noted that Beaulieu seemed to expect too much from his soldiers, was irritated and tended to blame the failure of his plans on others for not properly executing his orders. Graham also deplored the "petty intrigue" among the Austrian officers.

== Retirement ==
After Borghetto, Emperor Francis II replaced Beaulieu with Dagobert Sigmund von Wurmser. Beaulieu went into retirement after the 1796 campaign. In 1794, he had become proprietor of a Walloon regiment. Beaulieu succeeded Karl von Vierset as Inhaber of Infantry Regiment Nr. 58 and, at his death, was succeeded by Joseph L'Espine. The regiment served in the Danube theater during the War of the Third Coalition and the War of the Fifth Coalition. Beaulieu died in Linz, Austria in 1819.

== Notes ==
Military offices
| Preceded by Joseph Orosz de Csicsér-Balázsfalva | Proprietor (Inhaber) of Infantry Regiment Nr. 31; 1792–1794 | Succeeded by Johann Andreas Benjowsky von Benjow und Urbanow |
| Preceded by Karl-Albrecht von Vierset | Proprietor (Inhaber) of Infantry Regiment Nr. 58; 1794–1819 | Succeeded by Joseph L'Espine |
