= Battle of Millesimo =

Battle of the Montenotte campaign

- Part of the Montenotte campaign
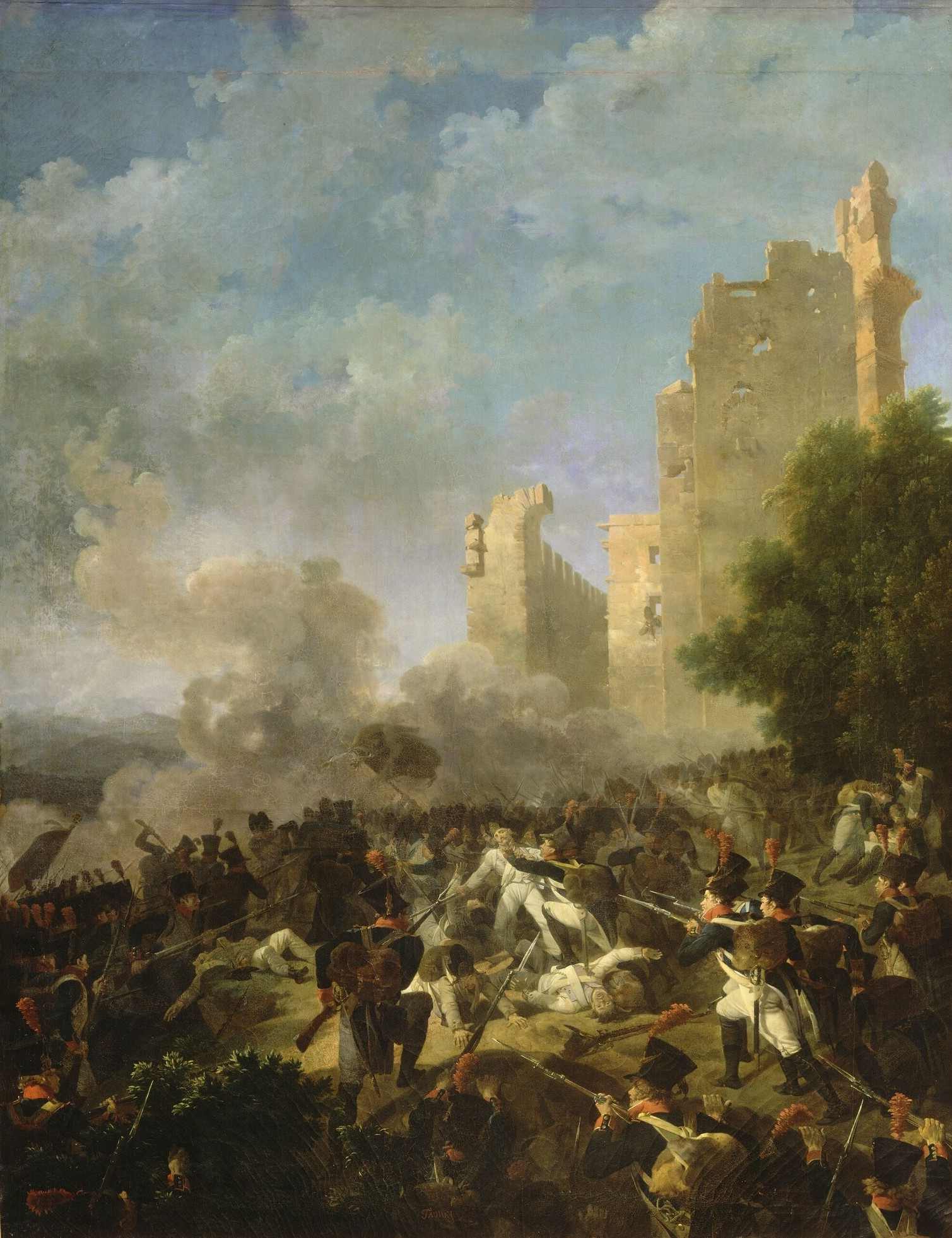
- 1812 painting of the battle
Date	13–14 April 1796
Location	Millesimo, Italy 44°22′N 8°12′E
Result	French victory

Belligerents
(French First Republic) French Republic	Kingdom of Sardinia (Holy Roman Empire) Habsburg monarchy

Commanders and leaders
(French First Republic) Napoleon Bonaparte (French First Republic) Auguste de Marmont (French First Republic) Louis-Gabriel Suchet (French First Republic) Pierre Augereau	(Holy Roman Empire) Giovanni di Provera (Kingdom of Sardinia) Filippo del Carretto †

Strength
9,000; 23 guns	Millesimo: 4,000; Cosseria: 988

Casualties and losses
Millesimo: 700; Cosseria: 1,000	Millesimo: 2,000–3,000, 18 guns; Cosseria: 988, 2 guns

The Battle of Millesimo, fought on 13 and 14 April 1796, was the name that Napoleon Bonaparte gave in his correspondence to one of a series of small battles that were fought in Liguria, Northern Italy between the armies of France and the allied armies of the Habsburg monarchy and of the Kingdom of Sardinia-Piedmont.

== Background ==
In late March 1796, General Bonaparte took command of the French Army of Italy, which consisted of around 40,000 men under arms. After being attacked near Genoa on 10 April by the left wing of the Habsburg army, under Feldzeugmeister Johann Beaulieu, Bonaparte initiated the Montenotte Campaign. The French advanced through the Cadibona Pass to defeat the isolated right wing of the Habsburg army, commanded by Feldmarschal-Leutnant (FML) Eugène-Guillaume Argenteau, at the Battle of Montenotte on 12 April. The French then moved further inland, intending to capture Dego and increase the separation between the Habsburg army and that of its ally, Piedmont-Sardinia.

== Battle ==
After his first victory at the Battle of Montenotte, Bonaparte swung the main weight of his offensive to the west against FML Michelangelo Colli's 21,000-strong Sardinian army. To keep Beaulieu's Habsburg army from interfering, the French commander sent André Masséna's division to seize Dego to the north. On 13 April, General of Division Pierre Augereau attacked FML Giovanni di Provera's weak Austrian Auxiliary Corps east of Millesimo and defeated him.

To cover the withdrawal of his command, Provera retreated to Cosseria Castle with part of the Hasbsburg Gyulai Freikorps and two grenadier companies of the Strassoldo Infantry Regiment # 27. Colonel Filippo Del Carretto's newly arrived Sardinian 3rd Grenadier battalion soon joined Provera. Bonaparte ordered the partly ruined hilltop castle to be taken. Augereau and General of Division Meynier's divisions mounted repeated assaults, but the allied garrison resisted stoutly. After leading the last attack of the day, Colonel Barthélemy Joubert wrote,

Nothing more terrible could be imagined than the assault, where I was wounded passing through a loophole; my carabiniers held me up in the air, with one hand I grasped the top of the wall. I parried the stones with my saber, and my whole body was the target for two entrenchments dominating the position ten paces off.

That evening, Augereau invested the castle while Bonaparte regrouped his forces. Early the next morning Augereau summoned the castle to surrender, whereupon Provera capitulated. By that time his men were out of food, ammunition, and water.

The report that Bonaparte wrote to the French government regarding the actions that took place around Millesimo, and which he called "The Battle of Millesimo" is confusing, and perhaps even deliberately misleading, as it is probable that Bonaparte did not want to reveal at the time how serious French casualties had been, and how close he had been to having his plans seriously compromised. There was, in fact, no real battle at Millesimo itself, but rather a confused action on 13 April, in which a number of small enemy units were driven back, followed by a short but very costly siege of the castle of Cosseria, which was defended by only about a thousand Austrians and Piedmontese under Provera and Del Carretto. It was only after the defenders had been forced to surrender the castle on 14 April, due to lack of ammunition, food and water, that the French advance inland could continue in safety. Bonaparte later admitted to the Piedmontese chief-of-staff, Colonel Joseph Costa that the siege of Cosseria had been a mistake and had been due to his impatience. It was probably because he wanted to cover up this mistake that Bonaparte's report of the "Battle of Millesimo" was so misleading.

== Results ==
The French lost 700 men in their fruitless attacks on 13 April. Provera's 988 men suffered only 96 killed and wounded, but the remainder became prisoners of war. The French Adjutant General Jean Quenin and General of Brigade Pierre Banel were killed, as was the Sardinian Del Carretto. Louis Suchet received promotion when his colonel was killed in the attack. Losses in the brief action earlier in the day are not known. The surrender of the castle allowed the French offensive to continue. On 14 April, Masséna won the Second Battle of Dego. Soon after, Bonaparte launched his army in a relentless westward drive against Colli's Austro-Sardinian forces.

=== See also ===
- Battle of Montenotte 12 April 1796
- Second Battle of Dego 14–15 April 1796
- Battle of Ceva 16 April 1796
- Battle of Mondovì 21 April 1796
- Montenotte Campaign
