= Montenotte campaign =

1796 campaign of the War of the First Coalition

- Part of the Alps Campaign and Italian campaign of 1796–1797
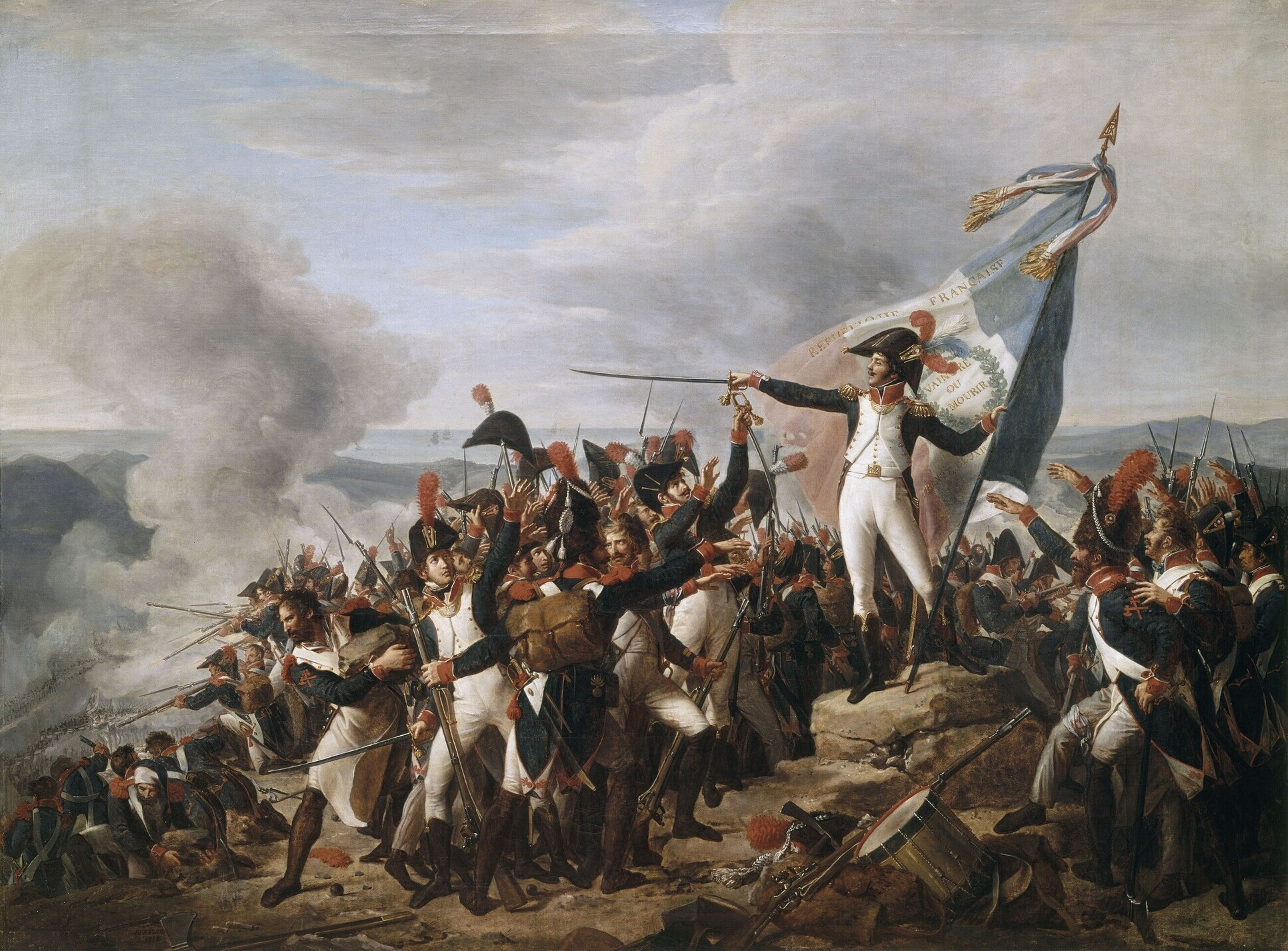
- The Battle of Montenotte, a major battle of the campaign
Date	10–28 April 1796 (2 weeks and 4 days)
Location	Republic of Genoa and Kingdom of Sardinia today Liguria and Piedmont regions in Italy 44°39′N 7°52′E
Result	French victory

Belligerents
(French First Republic) Republican France	Kingdom of Sardinia; Habsburg monarchy

Commanders and leaders
(French First Republic) Napoleon Bonaparte (French First Republic) André Masséna (French First Republic) Pierre Augereau (French First Republic) Jean-Baptiste Meynier (French First Republic) Jean-Mathieu-Philibert Sérurier	(Kingdom of Sardinia) Michelangelo Colli (Habsburg monarchy) Johann Beaulieu

Strength
37,600, 60 guns	67,000 total

Casualties and losses
6,000	25,000 total
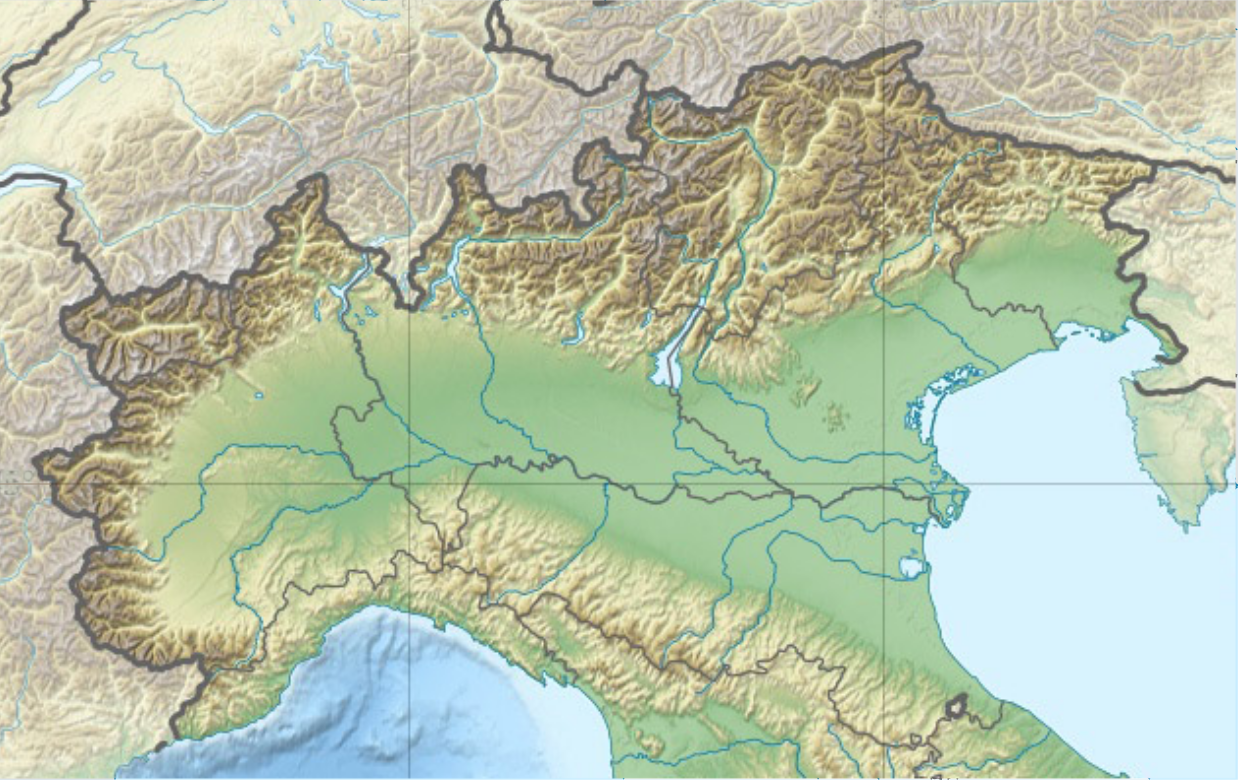
- Location within Northern Italy Montenotte campaign (Europe)

War of the First Coalition:
Italian Campaign
current battle
Napoleon as subordinate
Napoleon in command

The Montenotte campaign began on 10 April 1796 with an action at Voltri and ended with the Armistice of Cherasco on 28 April. It was the beginning of the Italian Campaign of 1796–1797, which would ultimately end the War of the First Coalition a year later. In his first army command, Napoleon Bonaparte's French army separated the army of the Kingdom of Sardinia-Piedmont under Michelangelo Alessandro Colli-Marchi from the allied Habsburg army led by Johann Peter Beaulieu. The French defeated both Habsburg and Sardinian armies and forced Sardinia to quit the First Coalition. The campaign formed part of the Wars of the French Revolution. Montenotte Superiore is located at the junction of Strada Provinciale 12 and 41 in the Liguria region of northwest Italy, 15 kilometres (9 mi) northeast of Carcare municipality. However, the fighting occurred in an area from Genoa on the east to Cuneo on the west.

In the spring of 1796, Bonaparte planned to launch an offensive against the combined armies of Sardinia and the Habsburg Monarchy. However, the Habsburg army moved first, attacking the French right flank at Voltri, near Genoa. In response, Bonaparte counterattacked the center of the enemy array, striking the boundary between the armies of his adversaries. Beating the Austrians at Montenotte, the budding military genius strove to drive the Piedmontese west and the Austrians northeast. Victories at Millesimo over the Sardinians and at Second Battle of Dego over the Austrians began to drive a deep wedge between them. Leaving a division to observe the stunned Austrians, Bonaparte's army chased the Piedmontese west after a second clash at Ceva. A week after the French drubbed the Sardinians at Mondovì the Sardinian government signed an armistice and withdrew from the War of the First Coalition. In two and a half weeks, Bonaparte had overcome one of France's enemies, leaving the crippled Habsburg army as his remaining opponent in northern Italy.

== Background ==
See Montenotte campaign order of battle for a list of French, Habsburg, and Sardinian units and organizations.

=== Before the campaign ===
The morale of the army was not of the highest order; the units were strung out in numerous small detachments[...], their communications exposed [...] For their meager rations they were dependent on the whim of fraudulent army contractors, who were amassing private fortunes at the expense of the soldiers [...] officers and men alike [...] quitted their units every day in search of food [...] their pay, already months in arrears [...] relied on the [...] practically bankrupt French Government. Every type of equipment was in short supply. Whole battalions were without shoes—many men even without muskets and bayonets; the entire transport facilities of the army amounted to 200 mules. [...] Part of the army was in a mutinous frame of mind, and it was common knowledge that royalist agents were at work in the ranks.

At the outset of the War of the First Coalition in 1792, the Army of Italy was raised by the French First Republic with 106,000 men. Due to a combination of desertion, sickness, and military action this had dwindled to a nominal force of 63,000 men by the time Napoleon Bonaparte took command in March 1796, and of that number only 37,600 men and 60 field guns were available for immediate action.

=== Aim and geography ===
The government of the French First Republic wished to drive Sardinia-Piedmont out of the First Coalition. To achieve this aim, the French Army of Italy first had to defeat Michelangelo Alessandro Colli-Marchi's 21,000-man Sardinian army (including 4,000 Austrians) and Johann Peter Beaulieu's 28,000-strong Habsburg army.

Several passes and river valleys crossed the Ligurian Alps between the Italian Riviera and Piedmont. From west to east, they were the Col de Tende which was guarded on the north by the fortress city of Cuneo, the Tanaro River which passed through Ceva, the Colle di Cadibona between Savona and Carcare, the Col di Giovo near Sassello, the Turchino Pass north of Voltri and the Bocchetta Pass north of Genoa. The coastal strip to the south was not sufficient to support an army unless it was well supplied. However, to the north, Piedmont and the Po valley were rich in resources. The theater of operations stretched from the Col de Tende on the west to Voltri on the east.

The town of Savona lies on the coast, 56 kilometres (35 mi) west of Genoa. Going northwest from Savona, a road crosses the Colle di Cadibona and reaches Carcare on the Bormida River, 20 kilometres (12 mi) from Savona. Continuing west from Carcare, the road passes through Millesimo after another 8 kilometres (5 mi). Crossing a divide near the hamlet of Montezemolo, the highway descends into the Tanaro River valley at the small fortress of Ceva. From Millesimo to Ceva is about 21 kilometres (13 mi). From Ceva to Mondovì is a distance of 22 kilometres (14 mi). Once past Mondovì, the road exits the mountains and enters the plains around the fortress of Cuneo (Coni). Cuneo is 25 kilometres (16 mi) west of Mondovì. The battle site at Montenotte Superiore is located on a side road 15 kilometres (9 mi) northeast of Carcare. Dego is 12 kilometres (7 mi) north of Carcare. Acqui, lies about 41 kilometres (25 mi) to the north of Dego.

=== Allied and French plans ===
Beaulieu planned for Karl Philipp Sebottendorf's Left Wing to attack the exposed French right flank. After smashing the French right, Sebottendorf would join Eugène-Guillaume Argenteau's 9,000-man Right Wing in crushing Bonaparte's main body near Savona. Beaulieu ordered Argenteau, based at Acqui, to attack Savona by way of Montenotte and Sassello. Though the Habsburg field army numbered 32,000 infantry, 5,000 cavalry, and 148 cannon, four battalions guarded Lombardy, others were marching to the front from their winter quarters in the Po River valley, and thousands were sick. Available strength may have been as low as 25,000 soldiers.

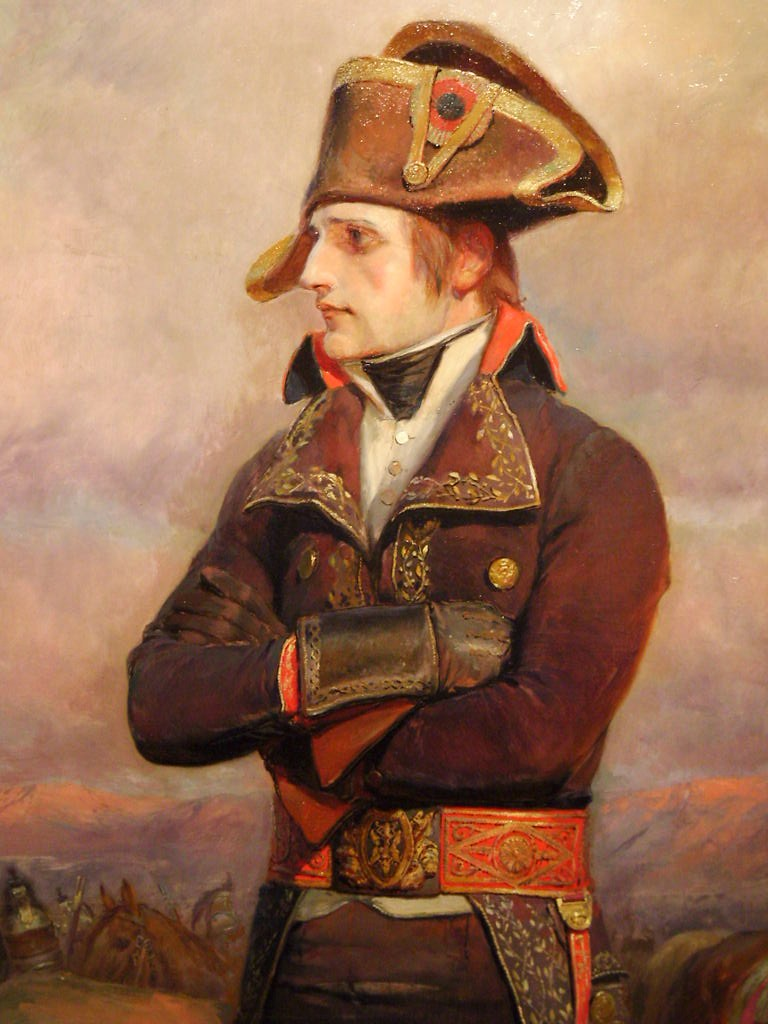
Portrait of Bonaparte in Italy by Édouard Detaille

The Austrian government feared that Piedmont wanted to drop out of the alliance and even change sides. Therefore, Beaulieu received secret instructions not to fully trust his ally. Consequently, he neglected to fully inform the Sardinians of his plans. Colli deployed his army between Dego and Cuneo, with his main weight to the west guarding the Col de Tende. He posted two battalions at Dego and part of Giovanni Marchese di Provera's Austrian brigade at Millesimo. Meanwhile, François Christophe de Kellermann's French Army of the Alps and the Prince of Corrigan's Sardinian army, each about 20,000 strong, glared at each other in the mountains west of Cuneo and Turin.

The French government found it useful to keep Jean-Baptiste Cervoni's brigade at Voltri in order to secure supplies from the nearby Republic of Genoa, which was neutral. Amedee Emmanuel Francois Laharpe stationed one brigade each on the Sassello and Carcare roads. Bonaparte posted Jean-Baptiste Meynier's division at Savona and Pierre Augereau's division farther west, with troops in the mountains. Jean-Mathieu-Philibert Sérurier's division held Ormea, while Francois Macquard and Pierre Dominique Garnier's small divisions covered the Col de Tende. About half of Henri Christian Michel de Stengel's cavalry was with the army, while the rest were en route from France. On 5 April Bonaparte received intelligence that Austrian troops were advancing on Voltri, Sassello and Dego. He placed his army on alert, but did not make any other changes.

Bonaparte rejected the Ormea route as too difficult and the Col de Tende route as too distant for his planned offensive. After a meticulous study of maps he determined to lunge across the Colle di Cadibona from Savona to seize Carcare. This town was the vital point linking the Habsburg army to the east with the Sardinian army to the west. Bonaparte planned to commit André Masséna's corps (Laharpe and Meynier) and Augereau to the main attack, while Sérurier threatened Ceva. He ordered Macquard and Garnier to make a feint in the Col di Tende area. The French offensive was set to begin on 15 April.

== Campaign ==
=== Voltri and Montenotte ===
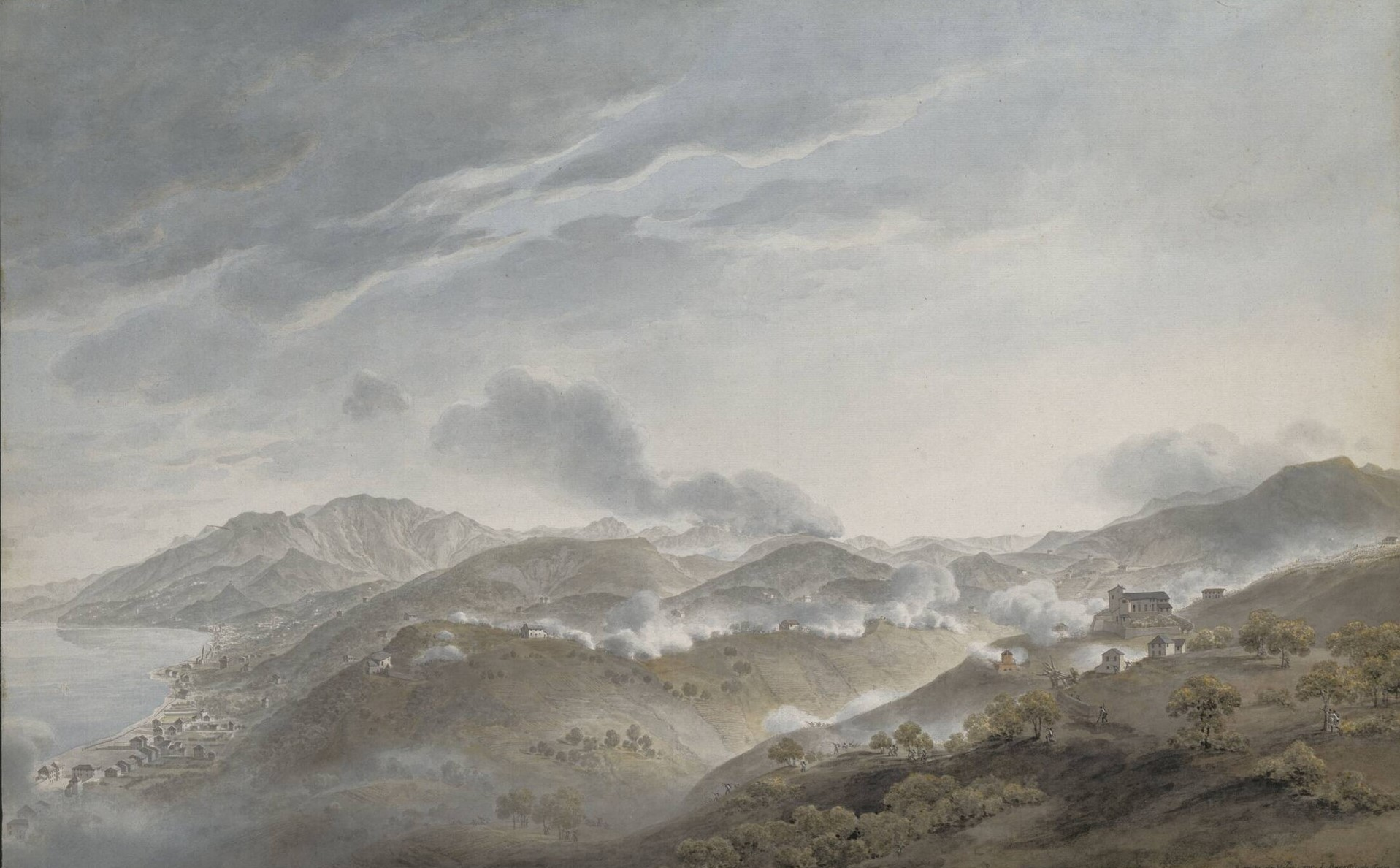
View of Voltri, 10 April 1796 (Giuseppe Pietro Bagetti, c. 1802–1806)

In the event, Beaulieu moved first. On 10 April, the Habsburg army commander accompanied Sebottendorf and 3,200 men as they advanced across the Turchino Pass to attack Cervoni's 5,000 Frenchmen in the Battle of Voltri. At the same time, Philipp Pittoni von Dannenfeld's 4,000-strong column traversed the Bocchetta Pass. "The attack was badly organized, poorly coordinated, and used a surprisingly small number of troops." Outnumbered, Cervoni "conducted a masterly withdrawal to the west" avoiding a trap. Beaulieu declined to pursue Cervoni and began transferring his units to support his right flank. He left two battalions to hold Voltri and sent four more with Josef Philipp Vukassovich to march through the hills to Sassello by a difficult road. The bulk of his troops were ordered back to Acqui.

A day late, Argenteau and Mathias Rukavina von Boynograd assembled 4,000 soldiers near Montenotte on the morning of the 11th. This force advanced southeast toward 2,000 French soldiers at Monte Negino (Monte Legino). Meanwhile, a second Austrian brigade occupied Sassello. Antoine-Guillaume Rampon repulsed several Austrian attacks at Monte Negino during the day. Bonaparte ordered Laharpe to attack Argenteau the next day with two brigades while Masséna enveloped the Austrian flank with the third brigade. He also directed Augereau and Meynier to concentrate at Carcare.

On 12 April, Bonaparte's French army defeated Argenteau's soldiers at the Battle of Montenotte. While Laharpe mounted a frontal attack with 7,000 troops from Monte Negino, Masséna moved north with 4,000 men to turn Argenteau's weak right flank. Meanwhile, 11,000 more troops were moved up behind the striking forces. Masséna's flanking movement broke through and Argenteau's efforts to plug the gap failed. The Austrian pulled back and the French mauled his outnumbered force. Argenteau withdrew his battered force to Dego, complaining that he could rally only 700 men to the colors.

=== Millesimo, Dego, and Ceva ===
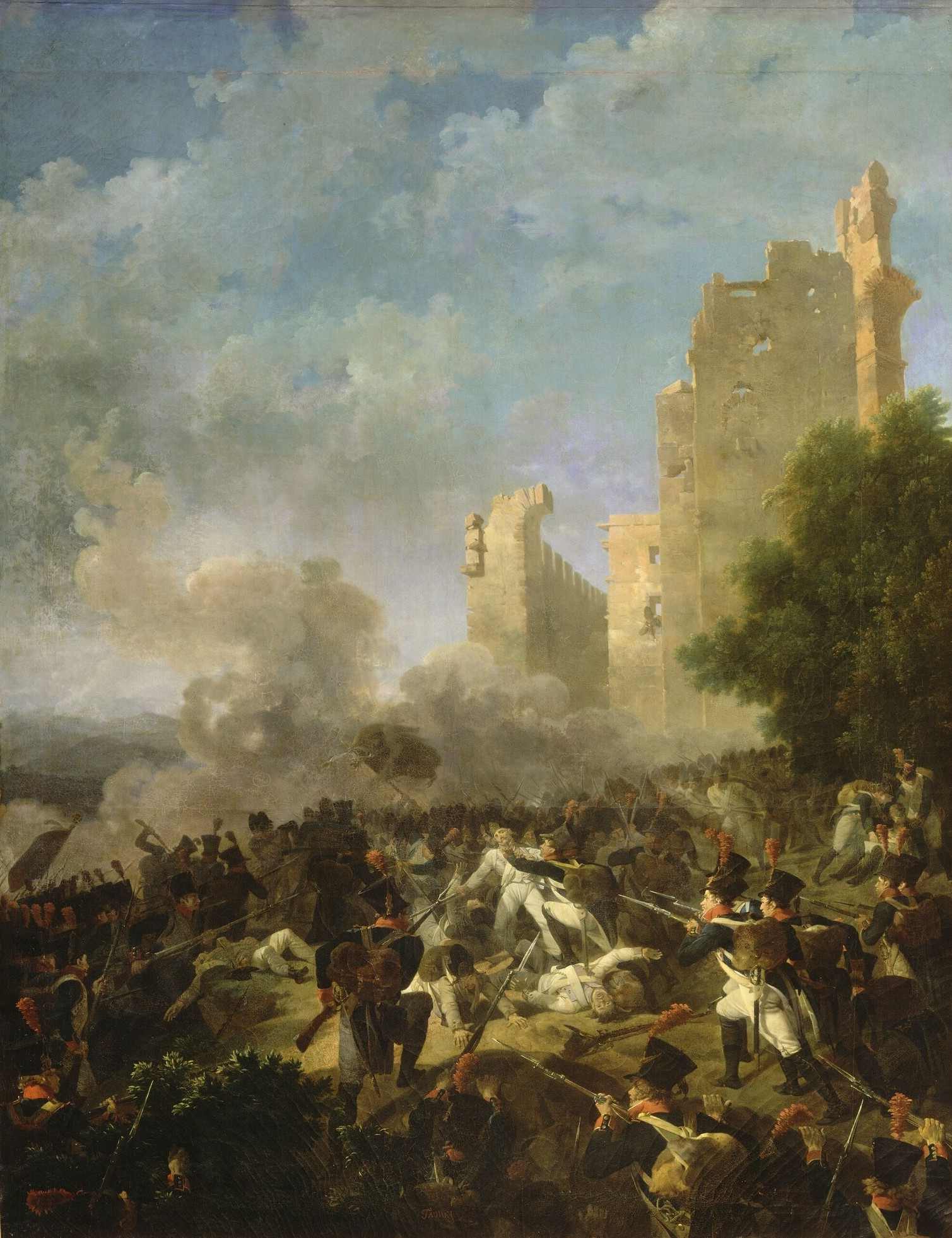
Attack on Cossaria Château, 13 April 1796 (Nicolas-Antoine Taunay, 1812)

Bonaparte turned west against Colli's army on 13 April. Augereau's division easily pushed back Provera's weak force in the Battle of Millesimo. To cover the retreat, Provera and 1,000 picked troops occupied a ruined hilltop castle. Instead of bypassing this obstacle, Bonaparte ordered Cosseria castle to be stormed. For the rest of the day, the Austro-Sardinians repelled several assaults with heavy French casualties. Provera surrendered the following morning when his defenders ran out of food, water, and ammunition. On 14 April, Bonaparte directed Masséna and Laharpe to attack Argenteau in the Second Battle of Dego. After inflicting 1,500 French casualties, most of the outnumbered Austrians were killed, wounded or captured. Argenteau led the remnant of his force back to Acqui. Bonaparte left Masséna and one of Meynier's brigades to hold Dego and ordered Laharpe back to Carcare.

Beaulieu ordered Vukassovich's brigade to Dego on the 14th but a poorly written order caused his subordinate to be a day too late. At dawn on 15 April, Vukassovich surprised Meynier's troops in the act of looting the town and routed the French. Masséna hastily recalled Laharpe to retake Dego. Several hours later, the heavily reinforced French retook the town after a tough fight, with Bonaparte supervising the assault. Vukassovich retreated to Acqui. After a clash between Augereau and Colli at Montezemolo, the Sardinians pulled back to Ceva. On 16 April, Augereau attacked the Sardinians and was repulsed in the Battle of Ceva. Fearing that Sérurier, who was approaching from Ormea, might attack him in the rear, Colli withdrew to the Corsaglia River at San Michele Mondovi. He left a battalion behind to hold Ceva's small fortress. Bonaparte ordered Laharpe to scout Sassello to determine Beaulieu's whereabouts. Meynier reported sick, so Masséna took direct command of his division, which remained near Dego.

=== Mondovì and Cherasco ===
Laharpe returned to Dego, reporting no enemy activity. Meanwhile, Beaulieu reassembled his battered army near Acqui and Colli directed Jean-Gaspard Dichat de Toisinge with 8,000 soldiers and 15 cannon to defend the Corsaglia position. On 19 April, Bonaparte ordered Sérurier to attack San Michele while Augereau flanked the river line from the north. Augereau's effort failed due to high water. Sérurier's soldiers fought their way across the river, but then dispersed in search of food and plunder. Colli counterattacked and threw the French back. That day, Bonaparte switched his supply line from the exposed Cadibona Pass to a safer route via Imperia and Ormea. Bonaparte called up Masséna to make a three division attack on the San Michele position. Laharpe guarded the army's rear against an Austrian attack.

Faced with a heavy French concentration, Colli abandoned the Corsaglia River line on the night of 20/21 April. But the vigorous French pursuit soon overran the Sardinian rearguard. Colli barely had time to arrange his troops before Sérurier attacked him in the Battle of Mondovì. The French general formed his least experienced troops into three columns and covered them with his veterans in open order. Then, leading his central column, Sérurier launched a charge with Masséna's division in support. Brushing aside spotty resistance, the French broke the Sardinian lines and forced them to abandon Mondovì. Dichat was killed. Stengel received a mortal wound while leading a force of dragoons in pursuit.

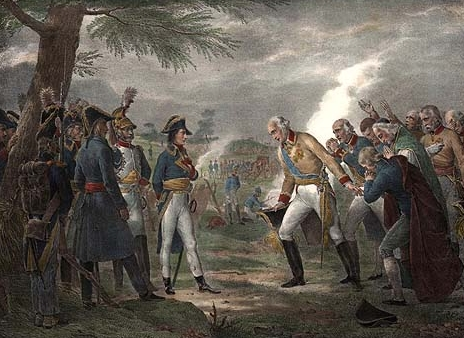
Illustration of the Armistice of Cherasco

After forcing Mondovì's municipal authorities to hand over a large quantity of provisions, Bonaparte launched his pursuit. On the morning of 23 April, the French army commander received a letter from Colli requesting an armistice. Ruthlessly, Bonaparte urged his men forward to conquer as much territory as possible. The arrival of the ragged and hungry French soldiers in the relatively wealthy plains prompted an outbreak of looting and Bonaparte had several men shot to discourage the practice. By 25 April, Sérurier was in Fossano on the left flank, Masséna held Cherasco in the center and Augereau occupied Alba on the right, while Laharpe brought up the rear. Macquard and Garnier were instructed to seize Cuneo. Bonaparte shifted his supply line again, this time to the secure Col de Tende.

Under the Armistice of Cherasco, signed on 28 April, territory east of the Stura di Demonte and Tanaro Rivers passed under French control. The fortresses of Cuneo, Ceva, and Tortona acquired French garrisons. In addition, the Sardinians granted the French army permission to cross its territory if it wished. A secret clause allowed Bonaparte to cross the Po River at the city of Valenza. Ratification of the armistice and the signing of a formal treaty was left to the French government. Bonaparte dispatched Joachim Murat to Paris with the details.

== Results ==
Succeeding where earlier armies had failed, Bonaparte and his soldiers knocked Sardinia out of the war in a single brief campaign. The French suffered 6,000 casualties during the campaign. Total Austrian and Sardinian losses stood around 25,000. With Sardinia-Piedmont pacified, the French were free to direct their attentions on their major enemy, Austria. Soon Bonaparte launched a new offensive, which resulted in victories over Beaulieu at the battles of Fombio and Lodi in May.

== Commentary ==
Historian Martin Boycott-Brown listed the reasons for Bonaparte's victory:

...not just the disastrous separation between Beaulieu and Argenteau, but also to that between the Austrian and Piedmontese armies. If the Austrians had chosen to concentrate closer to the Piedmontese positions, as Colli had wanted, it would have been less easy for Bonaparte to effect their separation. The defeat of the Piedmontese became almost inevitable from the moment Bonaparte managed to drive a wedge between the allies and obliged the Piedmontese to draw ever further from their only source of help by threatening to outflank them. It would be easy to heap the blame for this on Beaulieu, but as we have said before, he was given a difficult hand to play, and if he came off second best in a contest with one of the greatest strategists in the history of war, it is not surprising.
