= Charles-Pierre Augereau =

French military officer (1757–1816)

Marshal of the Empire Charles-Pierre-François Augereau Duke of Castiglione
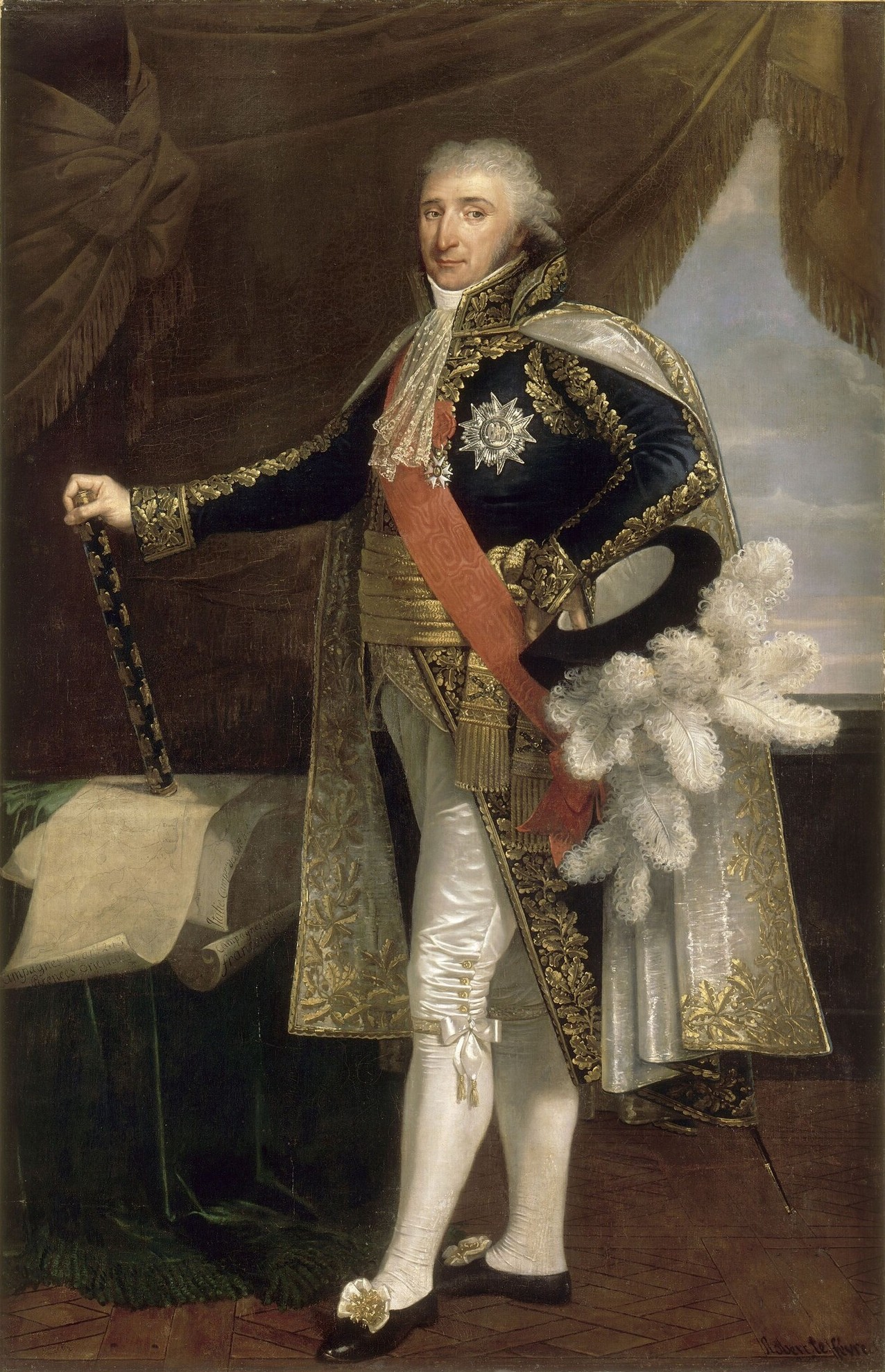
- 1805 portrait
- Born: 21 October 1757; Paris, France
- Died: 12 June 1816 (aged 58); La Houssaye-en-Brie, France
- Burial place: Père Lachaise Cemetery
- Relatives: Jean-Pierre Augereau (brother)
- Military career
- Allegiance: France
- Branch: French Army
- Service years: 1774–1815
- Rank: Marshal of the Empire
- Conflicts: Russo-Turkish War (1787–1792); Siege of Izmail; French Revolutionary Wars; Battle of Boulou; Battle of Sant Llorenç de la Muga; Battle of the Black Mountain; Battle of Loano; Montenotte campaign; Battle of Millesimo; Battle of Fombio; Battle of Borghetto; Battle of Castiglione; Battle of Rovereto; Napoleonic Wars; Ulm campaign; Battle of Jena-Auerstedt; Battle of Eylau; Third Siege of Gerona
- Awards: Grand Officer of the Legion of Honour; Grand Cross of the Order of Charles III of Spain; Knight of the Order of Saint Louis; Peer of France

Charles-Pierre-François Augereau, duc de Castiglione (English: /oʊˈʒəroʊ/ oh-ZHER-oh, French: [ʃaʁl pjɛʁ oʒʁo]; 21 October 1757 – 12 June 1816) was a French military commander and a Marshal of the Empire who served during the French Revolutionary Wars and the Napoleonic Wars. After serving in the Revolutionary Wars, he earned rapid promotion while fighting against Spain and soon found himself as a division commander under Napoleon Bonaparte in Italy. He fought in all of Bonaparte's battles of 1796 with great distinction. During the Napoleonic Wars, Napoleon entrusted Augereau with important commands. He distinguished himself as a corps commander at Jena, although at Eylau he led a charge into a snowstorm that proved disastrous. His life ended under a cloud because of his poor timing in switching sides between Napoleon and Louis XVIII. Napoleon wrote of Augereau that he "has plenty of character, courage, firmness, activity; is inured to war; is well liked by the soldiery; is fortunate in his operations". Augereau is generally counted as one of the most capable generals of the Napoleonic Wars.

== Early life ==
Augereau was born in Faubourg Saint-Marceau, Paris, as the son of a Parisian fruit seller (in some accounts, a servant). He enlisted in the army at the age of seventeen in the Clare Infantry Regiment, but was soon discharged. Later, he joined the dragoons. He became a noted swordsman and duellist, but he had to flee France after killing an officer in a quarrel. For the next 13 years Augereau drifted across Europe. He claimed to have served in the Russian Army against the Ottoman Empire, being present at the Siege of Izmail as a sergeant before deserting afterwards. He later enlisted in the infantry regiment of Prince Henry of Prussia and claimed he served in the Prussian Foot Guards as well. He deserted by masterminding a mass escape and reached Saxony, where he taught fencing.

In 1781, King Louis XVI proclaimed an amnesty for deserters, so Augereau returned to his native land. He joined the cavalry in 1784, and after serving in the carabiniers he was sent to the Kingdom of Naples as part of a military mission. While in Naples, he eloped with Gabrielle Grach and the two lovers travelled to Portugal where they spent the years 1788–1791. After the French Revolution broke out, the Portuguese jailed Augereau as a dangerous foreigner. Somehow, Gabrielle persuaded the authorities to release her husband and the couple returned to France. In September 1792, Augereau joined a volunteer cavalry unit, the German Legion, but this is without proof as Augereau claims that the papers were taken away from him during the Portuguese Inquisition.

== French Revolutionary Wars ==
Augereau's unit was sent to put down the revolt in the Vendée in April 1793. The German Legion proved useless in battle because many of the soldiers switched sides, and the officers, including Augereau and François Marceau, found themselves in prison. Released, he served briefly in the 11th Hussars before serving as wagonmaster and as aide-de-camp to General Jean Antoine Rossignol. He was then assigned to train recruits for General Jean-Antoine Marbot at Toulouse. Marbot liked his work and Augereau soon became a close friend of the Marbot family.

It is not clear when, or if, Augereau was promoted to general of brigade, but he transferred to the Army of the Eastern Pyrenees and was promoted to general of division on 23 December 1793. When General Jacques François Dugommier became commander in January 1794, the army was thoroughly reorganised. Augereau became a divisional commander and played a significant role at the Battle of Boulou from 29 April to 1 May, where his feint attacks lured the Spanish Army led by General Luis Firmín de la Unión into a false position. After the victory at Boulou, the army advanced a short distance into Spain, with Augereau holding the right wing. At the Battle of San-Lorenzo de la Muga on 13 August, he skillfully repelled the assaults of 20,000 Spanish troops with his 10,000 French troops. On 17 November, Dugommier launched a major offensive against the Spanish at the Battle of the Black Mountain. On the first day, Augereau's attack crushed the Spanish left flank while other French attacks proved unsuccessful. Dugommier was killed on the second day, but after a day's pause, the advance resumed and the Spanish were routed.

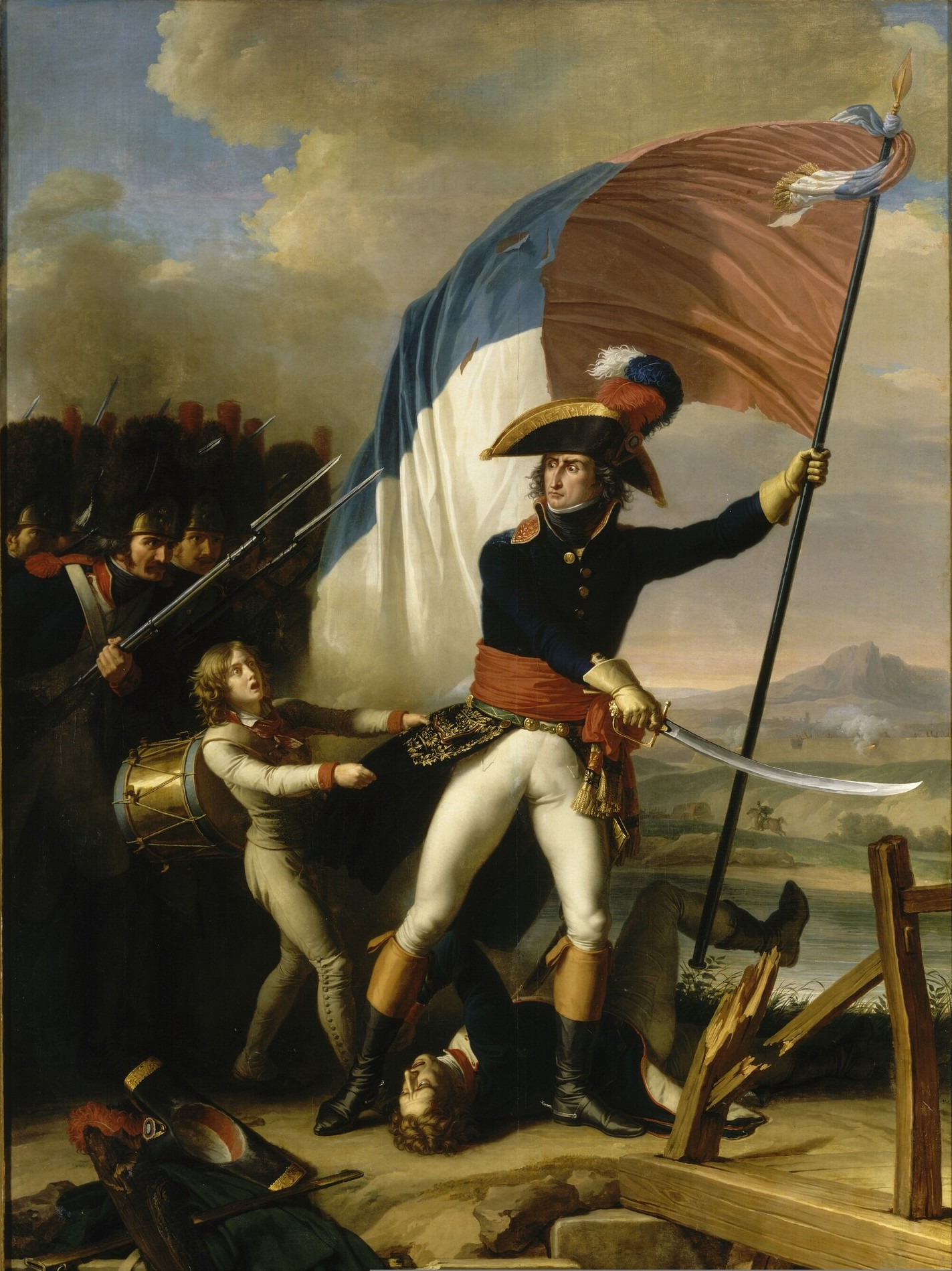
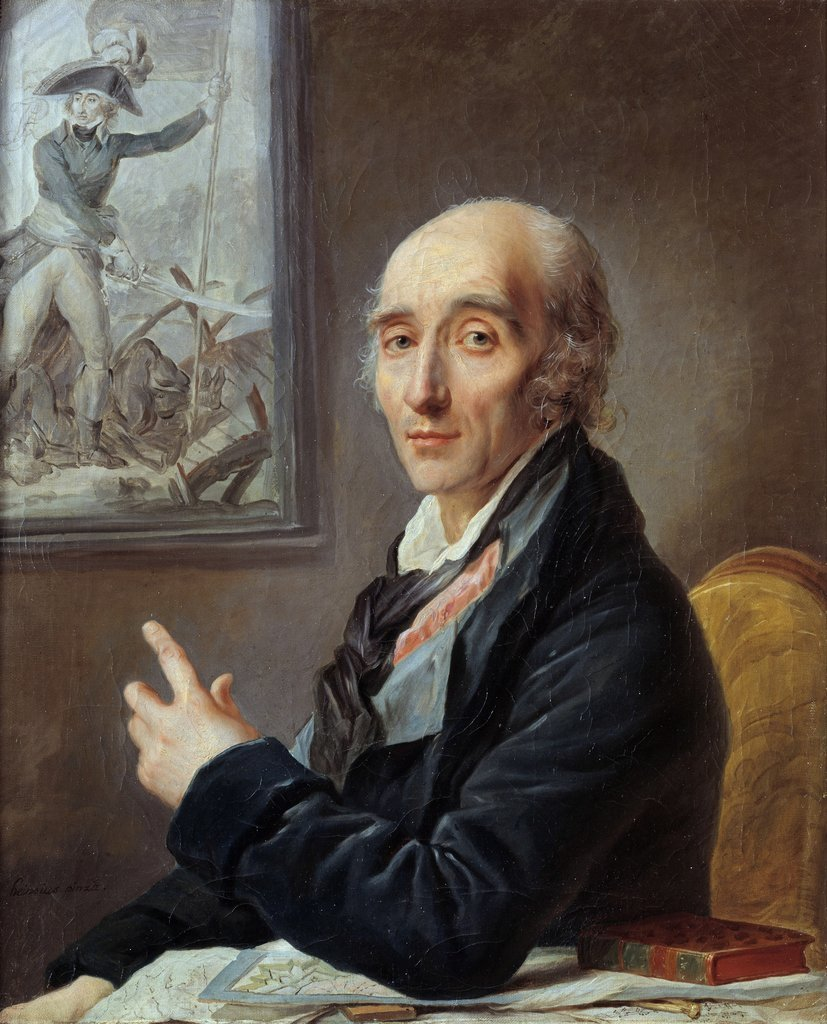
Left: General Augereau at the Bridge of Arcole by Charles Thévenin. Right: Portrait of Augereau with the Thévenin painting, by Johann Heinsius, between 1805–1812

After the Peace of Basel ended the War of the Pyrenees in July 1795, Augereau and his division were transferred to the Army of Italy. On 23 November 1795, Augereau fought at the Battle of Loano against the Austrians and Piedmontese. During the fighting, his troops attacked on the right near the coast, while General André Masséna's division pierced the Allied centre. The following April, his close association with Napoleon Bonaparte began when Bonaparte took command of the army and launched the Montenotte campaign. Augereau fought at the Battle of Millesimo on 13 April 1796, and accepted the surrender of the castle of Cosseria the next morning. He led his troops at the Battle of Ceva on the 16th, before serving in the Lodi campaign in early May and at the Battle of Borghetto on 30 May.

But it was at the Battle of Castiglione on 5 August 1796 that Augereau rendered the most notable services. In his memoirs, General Marcellin Marbot described Augereau as encouraging even Bonaparte himself in the confused situation that prevailed before that battle, though Marbot may not be the most reliable source, as he had not witnessed these events directly and because of his outspoken sympathy for Augereau. In any case, it was Bonaparte's undoubted superiority as a strategist that made the victory at Castiglione a possibility. On 3 August, while Bonaparte defeated the Austrian corps of General Peter Quasdanovich, Augereau held off the main Austrian army of General Dagobert Sigmund von Wurmser. With 11,000 men, he attacked General Anton Lipthay's brigade and drove it back on the Austrian main body. By the end of the day, Augereau faced 20,000 Austrians. The battle cost the Austrians about 1,000 casualties, while French losses were also heavy, including General Martial Beyrand who was killed. Augereau's bold front allowed Bonaparte to dispose of Quasdanovich, then mass his main strength to beat Wurmser at Castiglione two days later.

Shortly after Castiglione, Bonaparte tersely summed up Augereau's military qualities: "Much character, courage, steadiness, activity; is used to war, liked by the soldiers, lucky in his operations."

In 1797, Bonaparte sent Augereau to Paris to encourage the Jacobin Directors. Augereau and the troops led by him coerced the "moderates" in the councils and carried through the Coup of 18 Fructidor (4 September 1797). He was then sent to command French forces in Germany.

Augereau took little part in the coup d'état of 18 Brumaire in November 1799, and did not distinguish himself in the Rhenish campaign which followed. Nevertheless, owing to his final adhesion to Bonaparte's fortunes, Augereau received a Marshal's baton at the beginning of the First French Empire on 19 May 1804.

== Napoleonic Wars ==
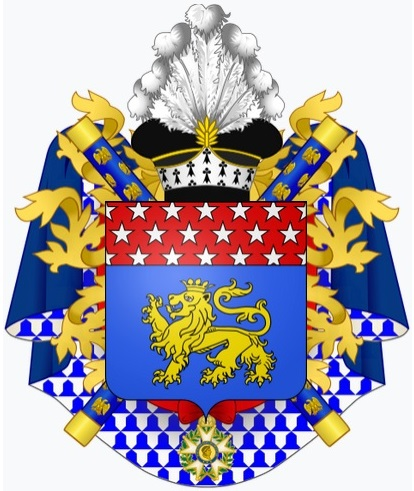
Heraldic achievement of Charles-Pierre-François Augereau, Duke of Castiglione

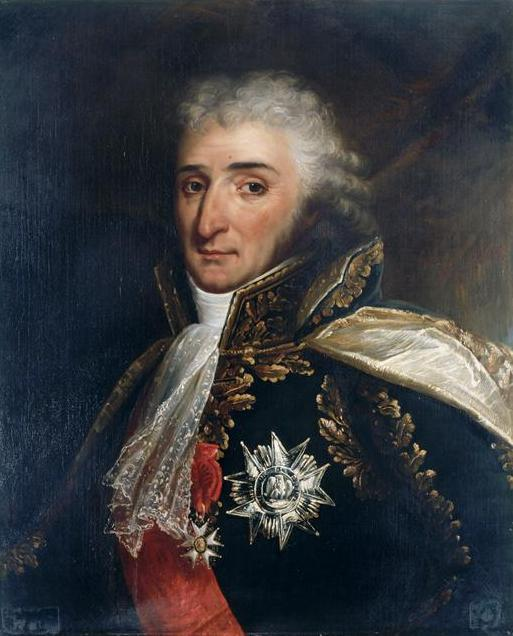
Portrait of Augereau by Jeanne Belloc, 1834

Augereau commanded a camp in Brest, Brittany, during preparations for the invasion of Britain. When Napoleon called off the invasion because of the growing threat from Austria and Russia, the camp became the VII Corps of the Grande Armée. With this force, Augereau fought in the War of the Third Coalition. His corps was charged with protecting the army's lines of communications during the Ulm campaign. He fought in the battles of Konstanz and Bregenz, before tracking down and destroying General Franz Jellacic's Austrian division at Dornbirn in Vorarlberg on 13 November 1805. This was followed by the occupation of Frankfurt am Main. His wife Gabrielle died while he was away.

During the War of the Fourth Coalition, Augereau was again commander of the VII Corps. He distinguished himself at the Battle of Jena on 14 October 1806 where his corps made up the left flank. Early in 1807, he fell ill with fever, and at the Battle of Eylau on 7 February 1807, he had to be supported on his horse. Nevertheless, he directed the movements of his corps with his usual bravery. Augereau's corps was almost annihilated and the marshal himself received a wound in the arm from grapeshot.

Augereau became Duke of Castiglione on 19 March 1808, a hereditary victory title (i.e. not in chief of an actual fief, but a hollow title), in honour of the 1796 victory. In 1809, he married the 19-year-old Adélaïde Josephine Bourlon de Chavange (1789 – 1869) whom he had become infatuated with. Adélaïde, the daughter of Gilles Bernard Bourlon de Chavange and his wife Jeanne Françoise Launuy, had no children with Augereau and the ducal title became extinct upon his death. His wife later remarried Camille de Sainte-Aldegonde (1787 – 1853), by whom she had a daughter Valentine de Sainte-Aldegonde (1820 – 1891), who married the 3rd Duke of Dino.

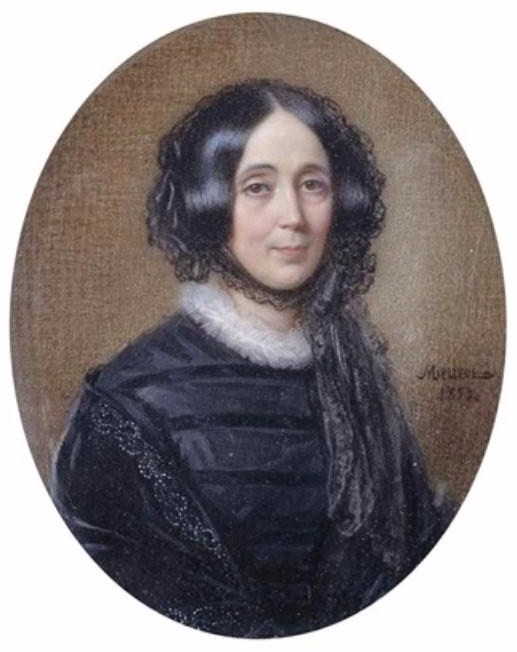
Adélaïde Josephine Bourlon de Chavange, Augereau's second wife

While serving in Catalonia during the Peninsular War from February to May 1810, Augereau gained some successes but tarnished his name with cruelty. It was Augereau's brother Jean-Pierre, serving under Louis Baraguey d'Hilliers, who was taken prisoner by the Russian vanguard near Smolensk. He sat out the German campaign in spring 1813 due to illness. Before the Battle of Leipzig in October, Napoleon reproached him with not being the Augereau of Castiglione; to which he replied, "Give me back the old soldiers of Italy, and I will show you that I am." Yet, he led the IX Corps at Leipzig with skill and brought off his command in good order.

In 1814, Augereau was given command of the army of Lyon, and his slackness exposed him to the charge of having come to an understanding with the Allies. Thereafter, he served the restored Bourbon King Louis XVIII. But, after reviling Napoleon, he went over to him during the Hundred Days. The emperor repulsed Augereau and charged him with being a traitor to France in 1814.

After being re-restored to the throne in 1815 following Napoleon's defeat, King Louis XVIII deprived Augereau of his military title and pension. Augereau died at his estate of La Houssaye only a year later. He is buried in the Père Lachaise Cemetery.
