= Battle of Monte Settepani order of battle =

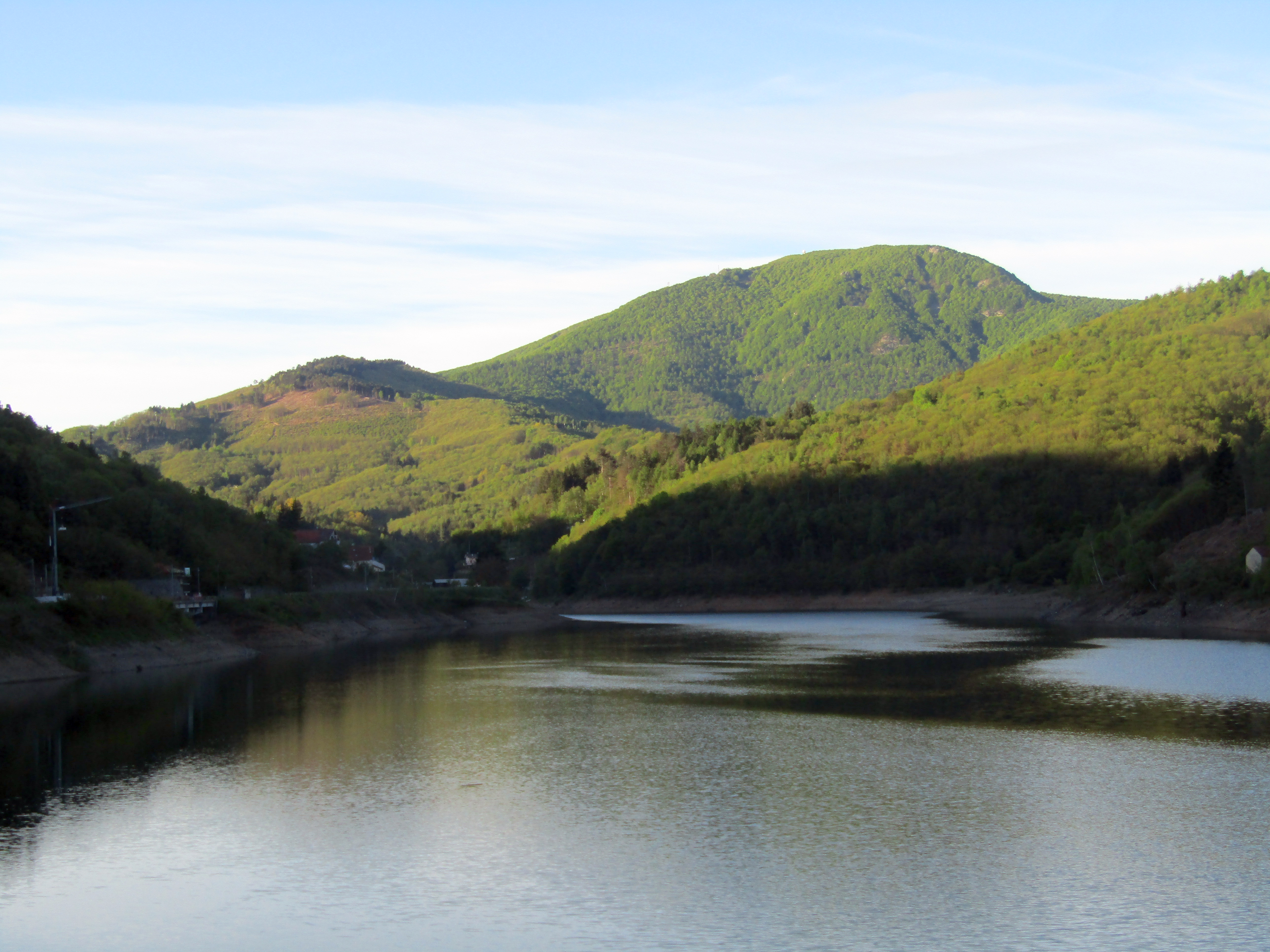
Monte Settepani as viewed from Lake Osiglia

The Monte Settepani order of battle is a detailed list of the Austrian and French forces that fought in the Battle of Monte Settepani from 24 June to 7 July 1795. The combined forces of Habsburg Austria and the Kingdom of Sardinia-Piedmont attacked the Republican French army and compelled it to retreat to a more defensible position. There are no sources for a Sardinian order of battle for 1795, so only the Austrian and French armies are listed.

== Abbreviations ==
- GD = French General of Division
- GB = French General of Brigade
- FZM = Austrian Feldzeugmeister
- FML = Austrian Feldmarschall-Leutnant
- GM = Austrian Generalmajor
- Col = Sardinian Colonel

== Austrian Army ==
- Army of Italy Commander: FZM Joseph Nikolaus de Vins

- 23,380 infantry, 2,788 cavalry, 772 artillery

Austrian Army of Italy on 20 June 1795
Division	Brigade	Units	Battalions	Squadrons
Division; FML Johann von Wenckheim	GM Mathias Rukavina	Karlstadter Grenz Regiment (Note: The list did not specify which of the Karlstadter Grenz regiments this was.)	2	0
Division; FML Johann von Wenckheim	GM Mathias Rukavina	Szluiner Grenz Regiment Nr. 63	1	0
Division; FML Johann von Wenckheim	GM Mathias Rukavina	Strassoldo Infantry Regiment Nr. 27	2	0
Division; FML Johann von Wenckheim	GM Mathias Rukavina	Meszaros Uhlan Regiment	0	2
Division; FML Johann von Wenckheim	GM Michael von Ternyey	Nadasdy Infantry Regiment Nr. 39	2	0
Division; FML Johann von Wenckheim	GM Michael von Ternyey	Archduke Anton Infantry Regiment Nr. 52	2	0
Division; FML Johann von Wenckheim	GM Philipp Pittoni	Brechainville Infantry Regiment Nr. 25	1	0
Division; FML Johann von Wenckheim	GM Philipp Pittoni	Lattermann Infantry Regiment Nr. 45	2	0
Division; FML Johann von Wenckheim	GM Philipp Pittoni	Alvinczi Infantry Regiment Nr. 19	2	0
Division; FML Johann von Wenckheim	GM Anton Lipthay	Reisky Infantry Regiment Nr. 13	3	0
Division; FML Johann von Wenckheim	GM Anton Lipthay	Terzi Infantry Regiment Nr. 16	3	0
Division; GM Karl von Türkheim	GM Joseph Canto d'Irles	Thurn Infantry Regiment Nr. 43	3	0
Division; GM Karl von Türkheim	GM Joseph Canto d'Irles	Jordis Infantry Regiment Nr. 59	1	0
Division; GM Karl von Türkheim	GM Joseph Canto d'Irles	Wilhelm Schröder Infantry Regiment Nr. 26	1	0
Division; GM Karl von Türkheim	GM Wilhelm Fischer	Meszaros Uhlan Regiment	0	6
Division; GM Karl von Türkheim	GM Wilhelm Fischer	Erdödy Hussar Regiment Nr. 9	0	2
Division; GM Karl von Türkheim	Alessandro Filangieri, Prince of Cuto (Neapolitans)	King's Dragoon Regiment	0	4
Division; GM Karl von Türkheim	Alessandro Filangieri, Prince of Cuto (Neapolitans)	Queen's Dragoon Regiment	0	4
Division; GM Karl von Türkheim	Alessandro Filangieri, Prince of Cuto (Neapolitans)	Prince Royal Dragoon Regiment	0	4

== Sardinian Army ==
- Sardinian Army commander: FML Michelangelo Alessandro Colli-Marchi

- Chief of Staff: Col Joseph Henri Costa de Beauregard

Austrian Auxiliary Corps in January 1796
Division	Units	Battalions	Squadrons
Auxiliary Corps; GM Eugène-Guillaume Argenteau (Note: In January 1796, the Auxiliary Corps was led by GM Giovanni Marchese di Provera, but at Monte Settepani it was led by Argenteau.)	Strassoldo Infantry Regiment Nr. 27	1	0
Auxiliary Corps; GM Eugène-Guillaume Argenteau	Belgiojoso Infantry Regiment Nr. 44	2	0
Auxiliary Corps; GM Eugène-Guillaume Argenteau	Schmidtfeld Infantry Regiment Nr. 48 (Note: This was sometimes known as the Caprara Regiment (Pivka, p. 84).)	2	0
Auxiliary Corps; GM Eugène-Guillaume Argenteau	Garrison Infantry Regiment (Note: It was not specified whether this was 1st Garrison Regiment Nr. 5 or 2nd Garrison Regiment Nr. 6 (Pivka, p. 82).)	1	0
Auxiliary Corps; GM Eugène-Guillaume Argenteau	Giulay Freikorps	2	0
Auxiliary Corps; GM Eugène-Guillaume Argenteau	Staff Dragoons	0	1

== French Army ==
- Army of Italy commander: GD François Christophe de Kellermann. Note: Kellermann commanded both the Army of Italy and the Army of the Alps.

- Kellermann's Chief of staff: GB Louis-Alexandre Berthier
- Army of Italy Chief of staff: GD Paul Louis Gaultier de Kervéguen
- GD André Massena commanded the three divisions of the Right Wing.

French Army of Italy on 19 June 1795
Division	Brigade	Units	Strength
1st Subdivision; Right Wing; GD François Freytag; 9,476 men	GB Jean-Baptiste Cervoni; 4,839 men	2/70th Line Demi-Brigade	429
1st Subdivision; Right Wing; GD François Freytag; 9,476 men	GB Jean-Baptiste Cervoni; 4,839 men	3/84th Line Demi-Brigade	292
1st Subdivision; Right Wing; GD François Freytag; 9,476 men	GB Jean-Baptiste Cervoni; 4,839 men	103rd Line Demi-Brigade	211
1st Subdivision; Right Wing; GD François Freytag; 9,476 men	GB Jean-Baptiste Cervoni; 4,839 men	99th Line Demi-Brigade	324
1st Subdivision; Right Wing; GD François Freytag; 9,476 men	GB Jean-Baptiste Cervoni; 4,839 men	1/101st Line Demi-Brigade	393
1st Subdivision; Right Wing; GD François Freytag; 9,476 men	GB Jean-Baptiste Cervoni; 4,839 men	118th Line Demi-Brigade	1,100
1st Subdivision; Right Wing; GD François Freytag; 9,476 men	GB Jean-Baptiste Cervoni; 4,839 men	5/Corrèze Volunteers	382
1st Subdivision; Right Wing; GD François Freytag; 9,476 men	GB Jean-Baptiste Cervoni; 4,839 men	1st Grenadier Battalion	459
1st Subdivision; Right Wing; GD François Freytag; 9,476 men	GB Jean-Baptiste Cervoni; 4,839 men	6th Grenadier Battalion	531
1st Subdivision; Right Wing; GD François Freytag; 9,476 men	GB Jean-Baptiste Cervoni; 4,839 men	7th Grenadier Battalion	531
1st Subdivision; Right Wing; GD François Freytag; 9,476 men	GB Jean-Baptiste Cervoni; 4,839 men	Artillery, sappers, miners	187
1st Subdivision; Right Wing; GD François Freytag; 9,476 men	GB Amédée Laharpe; 4,637 men	3/99th Line Demi-Brigade	275
1st Subdivision; Right Wing; GD François Freytag; 9,476 men	GB Amédée Laharpe; 4,637 men	1/100th Line Demi-Brigade	369
1st Subdivision; Right Wing; GD François Freytag; 9,476 men	GB Amédée Laharpe; 4,637 men	1/117th Line Demi-Brigade	391
1st Subdivision; Right Wing; GD François Freytag; 9,476 men	GB Amédée Laharpe; 4,637 men	129th Line Demi-Brigade	1,152
1st Subdivision; Right Wing; GD François Freytag; 9,476 men	GB Amédée Laharpe; 4,637 men	4/Ardeche Volunteers	417
1st Subdivision; Right Wing; GD François Freytag; 9,476 men	GB Amédée Laharpe; 4,637 men	Chasseurs des Hautes-Alpes	437
1st Subdivision; Right Wing; GD François Freytag; 9,476 men	GB Amédée Laharpe; 4,637 men	2/Haute-Loire Volunteers	508
1st Subdivision; Right Wing; GD François Freytag; 9,476 men	GB Amédée Laharpe; 4,637 men	3rd Grenadier Battalion	499
1st Subdivision; Right Wing; GD François Freytag; 9,476 men	GB Amédée Laharpe; 4,637 men	14th Grenadier Battalion	284
1st Subdivision; Right Wing; GD François Freytag; 9,476 men	GB Amédée Laharpe; 4,637 men	Artillery, sappers	305
2nd Subdivision; Right Wing; GD André Massena; 5,308 men	GB Louis Jean-Baptiste Gouvion; 2,029 men	3/56th Line Demi-Brigade	274
2nd Subdivision; Right Wing; GD André Massena; 5,308 men	GB Louis Jean-Baptiste Gouvion; 2,029 men	2/ and 3/101st Demi-Brigade	760
2nd Subdivision; Right Wing; GD André Massena; 5,308 men	GB Louis Jean-Baptiste Gouvion; 2,029 men	1/166th Demi-Brigade	322
2nd Subdivision; Right Wing; GD André Massena; 5,308 men	GB Louis Jean-Baptiste Gouvion; 2,029 men	9th Grenadier Battalion	526
2nd Subdivision; Right Wing; GD André Massena; 5,308 men	GB Louis Jean-Baptiste Gouvion; 2,029 men	Sappers	147
2nd Subdivision; Right Wing; GD André Massena; 5,308 men	Adjutant-General Pardon; 1,626 men	2/3rd Light Demi-Brigade	298
2nd Subdivision; Right Wing; GD André Massena; 5,308 men	Adjutant-General Pardon; 1,626 men	16th Light Demi-Brigade	679
2nd Subdivision; Right Wing; GD André Massena; 5,308 men	Adjutant-General Pardon; 1,626 men	2/103rd Line Demi-Brigade	89
2nd Subdivision; Right Wing; GD André Massena; 5,308 men	Adjutant-General Pardon; 1,626 men	11th Grenadier Battalion	490
2nd Subdivision; Right Wing; GD André Massena; 5,308 men	Adjutant-General Pardon; 1,626 men	Corsican Franche companies	70
2nd Subdivision; Right Wing; GD André Massena; 5,308 men	GB Jean Nicolas; 1,311 men	1/ and 3/70th Line Demi-Brigade	727
2nd Subdivision; Right Wing; GD André Massena; 5,308 men	GB Jean Nicolas; 1,311 men	1/99th Line Demi-Brigade	272
2nd Subdivision; Right Wing; GD André Massena; 5,308 men	GB Jean Nicolas; 1,311 men	3/166th Line Demi-Brigade	312
2nd Subdivision; Right Wing; GD André Massena; 5,308 men	Other: 342 men	Artillery	257
2nd Subdivision; Right Wing; GD André Massena; 5,308 men	Other: 342 men	Gendarmes	85
3rd Subdivision; Right Wing; GD Jean Sérurier; 5,148 men	Unknown; 1,542	19th Line Demi-Brigade	1,083
3rd Subdivision; Right Wing; GD Jean Sérurier; 5,148 men	Unknown; 1,542	52nd Line Demi-Brigade	397
3rd Subdivision; Right Wing; GD Jean Sérurier; 5,148 men	Unknown; 1,542	Artillery, sappers	62
3rd Subdivision; Right Wing; GD Jean Sérurier; 5,148 men	GB Louis Pelletier; 1,192	56th Line Demi-Brigade	857
3rd Subdivision; Right Wing; GD Jean Sérurier; 5,148 men	GB Louis Pelletier; 1,192	2/46th Line Demi-Brigade (Note: Nafziger's list says "2/56th". Since the 2nd Battalion is already included in the 56th Line Demi-Brigade, it seems reasonable to conclude it is a typographical error for the missing "2/46th" in Miollis' brigade.)	261
3rd Subdivision; Right Wing; GD Jean Sérurier; 5,148 men	GB Louis Pelletier; 1,192	Artillery	74
3rd Subdivision; Right Wing; GD Jean Sérurier; 5,148 men	GB Sextius Miollis; 2,414	51st Line Demi-Brigade	944
3rd Subdivision; Right Wing; GD Jean Sérurier; 5,148 men	GB Sextius Miollis; 2,414	1/ and 3/46th Line Demi-Brigade	604
3rd Subdivision; Right Wing; GD Jean Sérurier; 5,148 men	GB Sextius Miollis; 2,414	3/3rd Light Demi-Brigade	355
3rd Subdivision; Right Wing; GD Jean Sérurier; 5,148 men	GB Sextius Miollis; 2,414	5th Grenadier Battalion	439
3rd Subdivision; Right Wing; GD Jean Sérurier; 5,148 men	GB Sextius Miollis; 2,414	Artillery	72
Center Division; GD François Macquard; 6,397 men	GB François Léon Lebrun; 690	3/165th Line Demi-Brigade	438
Center Division; GD François Macquard; 6,397 men	GB François Léon Lebrun; 690	4/Vaucluse Volunteers	135
Center Division; GD François Macquard; 6,397 men	GB François Léon Lebrun; 690	3/20th Dragoon Regiment	117
Center Division; GD François Macquard; 6,397 men	GB Claude Dallemagne; 3,288	1/3rd Light Demi-Brigade	378
Center Division; GD François Macquard; 6,397 men	GB Claude Dallemagne; 3,288	165th Line Demi-Brigade	773
Center Division; GD François Macquard; 6,397 men	GB Claude Dallemagne; 3,288	1st Tirailleur Battalion	229
Center Division; GD François Macquard; 6,397 men	GB Claude Dallemagne; 3,288	Montferme Battalion	457
Center Division; GD François Macquard; 6,397 men	GB Claude Dallemagne; 3,288	4th Grenadier Battalion	451
Center Division; GD François Macquard; 6,397 men	GB Claude Dallemagne; 3,288	13th Grenadier Battalion	469
Center Division; GD François Macquard; 6,397 men	GB Claude Dallemagne; 3,288	Artillery	183
Center Division; GD François Macquard; 6,397 men	GB Claude Dallemagne; 3,288	Sappers	348
Center Division; GD François Macquard; 6,397 men	GB Joseph David de Barquier; 2,419	2/102nd Line Demi-Brigade	389
Center Division; GD François Macquard; 6,397 men	GB Joseph David de Barquier; 2,419	2/117th Line Demi-Brigade	499
Center Division; GD François Macquard; 6,397 men	GB Joseph David de Barquier; 2,419	1/Paris Volunteers	471
Center Division; GD François Macquard; 6,397 men	GB Joseph David de Barquier; 2,419	8/Saone-et-Loire Volunteers	274
Center Division; GD François Macquard; 6,397 men	GB Joseph David de Barquier; 2,419	10/Ain Volunteers	243
Center Division; GD François Macquard; 6,397 men	GB Joseph David de Barquier; 2,419	10th Grenadier Battalion	509
Center Division; GD François Macquard; 6,397 men	GB Joseph David de Barquier; 2,419	Artillery	34
Left Division; GD Pierre Garnier; 4,367 men	GB Pierre François Verne; 1,587	1/ and 3/20th Line Demi-Brigade	979
Left Division; GD Pierre Garnier; 4,367 men	GB Pierre François Verne; 1,587	1/24th Line Demi-Brigade	46
Left Division; GD Pierre Garnier; 4,367 men	GB Pierre François Verne; 1,587	2/102nd Line Demi-Brigade	406
Left Division; GD Pierre Garnier; 4,367 men	GB Pierre François Verne; 1,587	5/Herault Volunteers	68
Left Division; GD Pierre Garnier; 4,367 men	GB Pierre François Verne; 1,587	Artillery, sappers	88
Left Division; GD Pierre Garnier; 4,367 men	GB François Rambeaud; 1,320	15th Light Demi-Brigade	594
Left Division; GD Pierre Garnier; 4,367 men	GB François Rambeaud; 1,320	2nd Grenadier Battalion	492
Left Division; GD Pierre Garnier; 4,367 men	GB François Rambeaud; 1,320	2nd Franche Company	95
Left Division; GD Pierre Garnier; 4,367 men	GB François Rambeaud; 1,320	Marseille Chasseurs	28
Left Division; GD Pierre Garnier; 4,367 men	GB François Rambeaud; 1,320	Artillery, sappers	111
Left Division; GD Pierre Garnier; 4,367 men	GB Jean Ignace Pierre; 361	Det. 20th Line Demi-Brigade	306
Left Division; GD Pierre Garnier; 4,367 men	GB Jean Ignace Pierre; 361	Artillery	55
Left Division; GD Pierre Garnier; 4,367 men	GB Guilin Laurent Bizanet; 1,099	2/20th Line Demi-Brigade	221
Left Division; GD Pierre Garnier; 4,367 men	GB Guilin Laurent Bizanet; 1,099	84th Line Demi-Brigade	878

== See also ==
- List of orders of battle

== Notes ==
Footnotes

Citations
