= Battle of Monte Settepani =

1795 battle of the Alps Campaign

- Part of the Alps Campaign
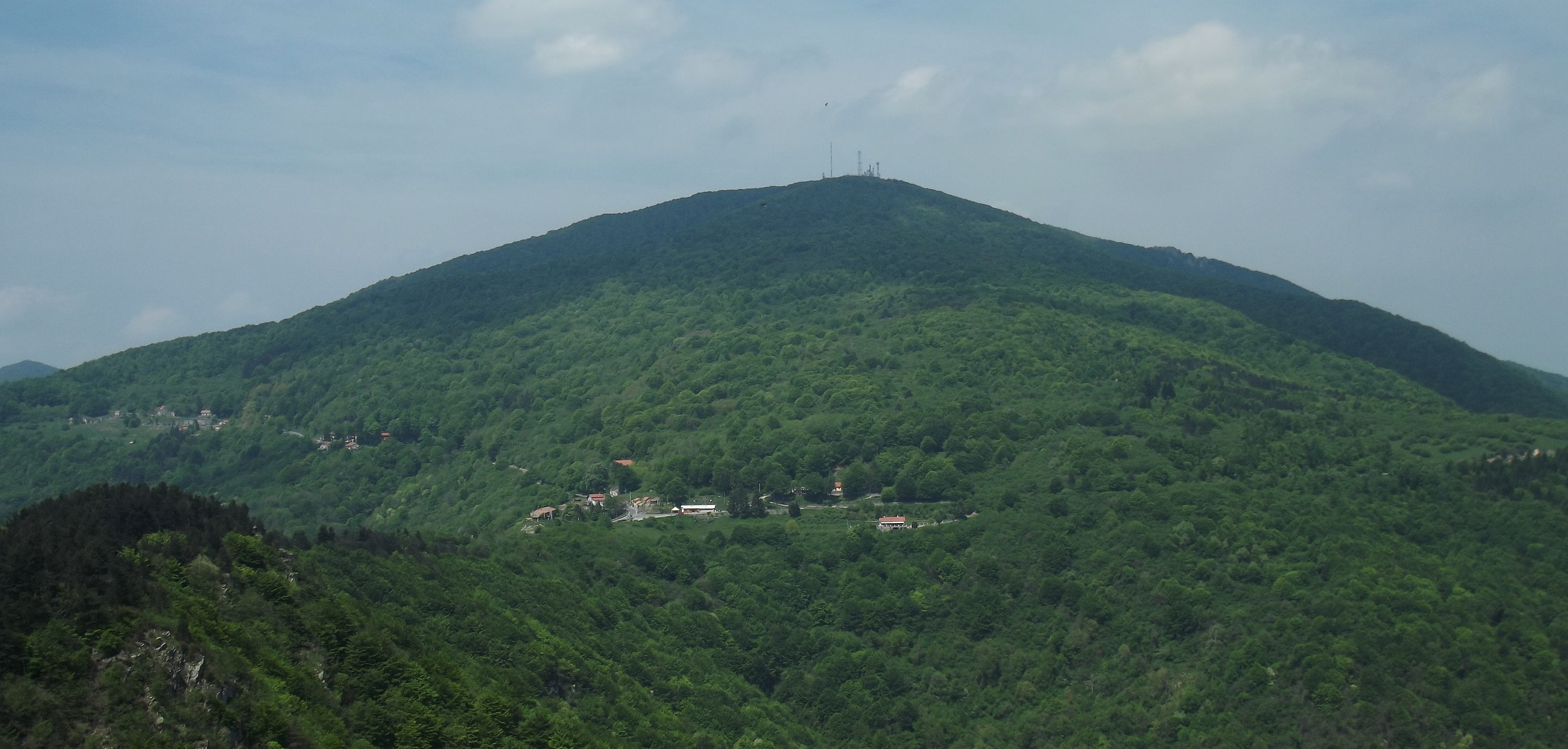
- Monte Settepani as seen from Bric Gettina
Date	24 June–7 July 1795
Location	Monte Settepani, Liguria, Italy 44°14′42″N 8°11′51″E
Result	Austro-Sardinian victory

Belligerents
Habsburg Austria; Kingdom of Sardinia	Republican France

Commanders and leaders
Joseph de Vins (Kingdom of Sardinia) Michelangelo Colli	François Kellermann

Strength
38,940	30,696

Casualties and losses
Unknown	Unknown, 20 guns

The Battle of Monte Settepani (24 June–7 July 1795) saw the Coalition armies of Habsburg Austria led by Feldzeugmeister (FZM) Joseph Nikolaus de Vins and the Kingdom of Sardinia-Piedmont led by Feldmarschall-Leutnant (FML) Michelangelo Alessandro Colli-Marchi attack the Republican French Army of Italy led by General of Division (GD) François Christophe de Kellermann during the War of the First Coalition. The attack captured a few key positions though it was repulsed by most of the French defenses. After the French failed to recapture Monte Settepani, Kellermann ordered a phased withdrawal to a more defensible position. By 7 July, the French army established itself in a new position running from Borghetto Santo Spirito on the coast northwest to the crest of the Ligurian Alps. The setback compelled the French to relinquish the territory captured in the First Battle of Dego.

== Background ==
The war between France and Sardinia-Piedmont began in the spring of 1792, but French troops did not invade the Duchy of Savoy until 21 September 1792. Savoy was rapidly overrun with little resistance. The French also invaded the County of Nice, occupying Nice on 29 September. The Sardinian army in the County of Nice withdrew to defenses in the Maritime Alps covering the key Col de Tende. Before the end of 1792, the French troops in Savoy were organized into the Army of the Alps while the troops in the County of Nice became the Army of Italy. In the First Battle of Saorgio on 12 June 1793, the Sardinians repulsed a determined French assault on the mountain barrier. On 7 September 1793, the Sardinians launched a campaign to retake the County of Nice, but it was too late in the season. The operation sputtered out after a drawn battle at Utelle on 21 October.

On 1 January 1794, GD Pierre Jadart Dumerbion assumed command of the Army of Italy. In the Second Battle of Saorgio in April 1794, the army succeeded in ousting the Sardinians from their defenses and capturing the Col de Tende. The battle plan was provided by the army's new chief of artillery, General of Brigade (GB) Napoleon Bonaparte. Noticing that the Austro-Sardinian forces were preparing an attack, Dumerbion mounted an operation in September. Also planned by Bonaparte, the offensive drove back the Austrians and ended with the First Battle of Dego, a French victory on 21 September 1794. This triumph secured the port of Vado Ligure for the French. On 21 November 1794, Dumerbion was replaced in command by GD Barthélemy Louis Joseph Schérer. During the winter of 1794–1795, many French soldiers died of typhus and other diseases. On 6 May 1795, Schérer was replaced by Kellermann who was given command of both the Army of Italy and the Army of the Alps.

== Forces ==
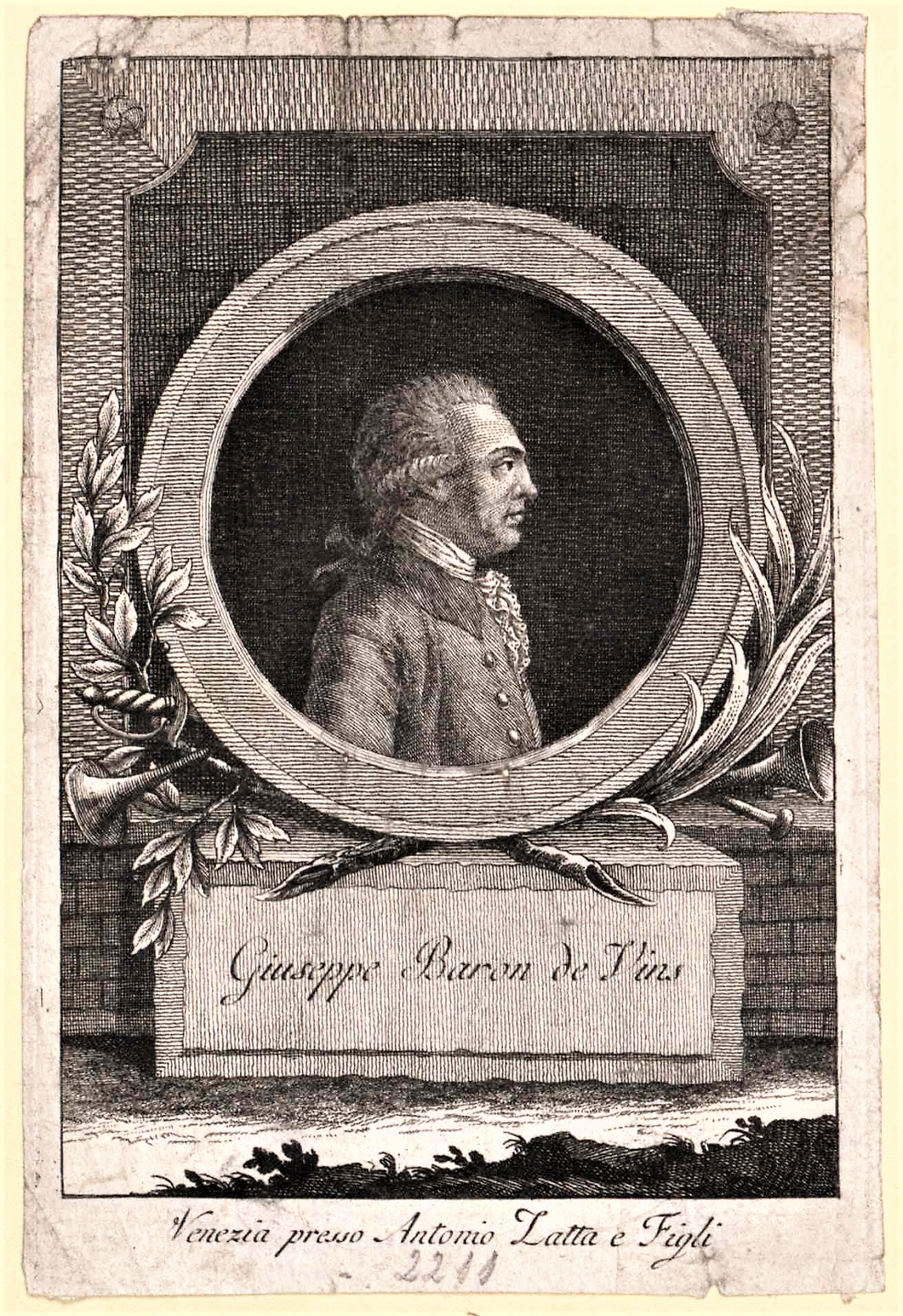
Joseph de Vins

On 20 June 1795, de Vins commanded an Austrian army composed of 23,380 infantry, 2,788 cavalry, and 772 artillerymen, a total strength of 26,940 men. Only the cavalry units from the Kingdom of Naples were not Austrian soldiers. The army was organized into two divisions led by FML Johann von Wenckheim and Generalmajor (GM) Karl von Türkheim. Wenckheim's division included four brigades led by GM Mathias Rukavina (5 battalions and 2 squadrons), GM Michael von Ternyey (4 battalions), GM Philipp Pittoni (5 battalions), and GM Anton Lipthay (6 battalions). Türkheim's division consisted of one infantry brigade led by GM Joseph Canto d'Irles (5 battalions), and two cavalry brigades led by GM Wilhelm Fischer (8 squadrons) and Alessandro Filangieri, Prince Cuto (12 Neapolitan squadrons). (Note: By convention, battalions always refer to infantry formations and squadrons always refer to cavalry formations.) Precise numbers are elusive, but there were 12,000 Sardinian troops opposing the Army of Italy in October 1795. The Sardinians were commanded by Colli whose chief of staff was Colonel Joseph Henri Costa de Beauregard.

On 19 June 1795, Kellermann's French army was organized into a strong Right Wing commanded by GD André Massena, a Center Division led by GD François Macquard (6,397 men), and a Left Division directed by GD Pierre Dominique Garnier (4,367 men). Massena's Right Wing was subdivided into three divisions led by GD François Xavier Jacob Freytag (9,476 men), Massena (5,308 men), and GD Jean-Mathieu-Philibert Sérurier (5,148 men). Freytag's division was made up of two large brigades under GB Amédée Emmanuel François Laharpe (4,637 men) and GB Jean-Baptiste Cervoni (4,839 men). The troop strength in the Army of Italy's active divisions was 30,696 men.

== Battle ==
=== Positions ===
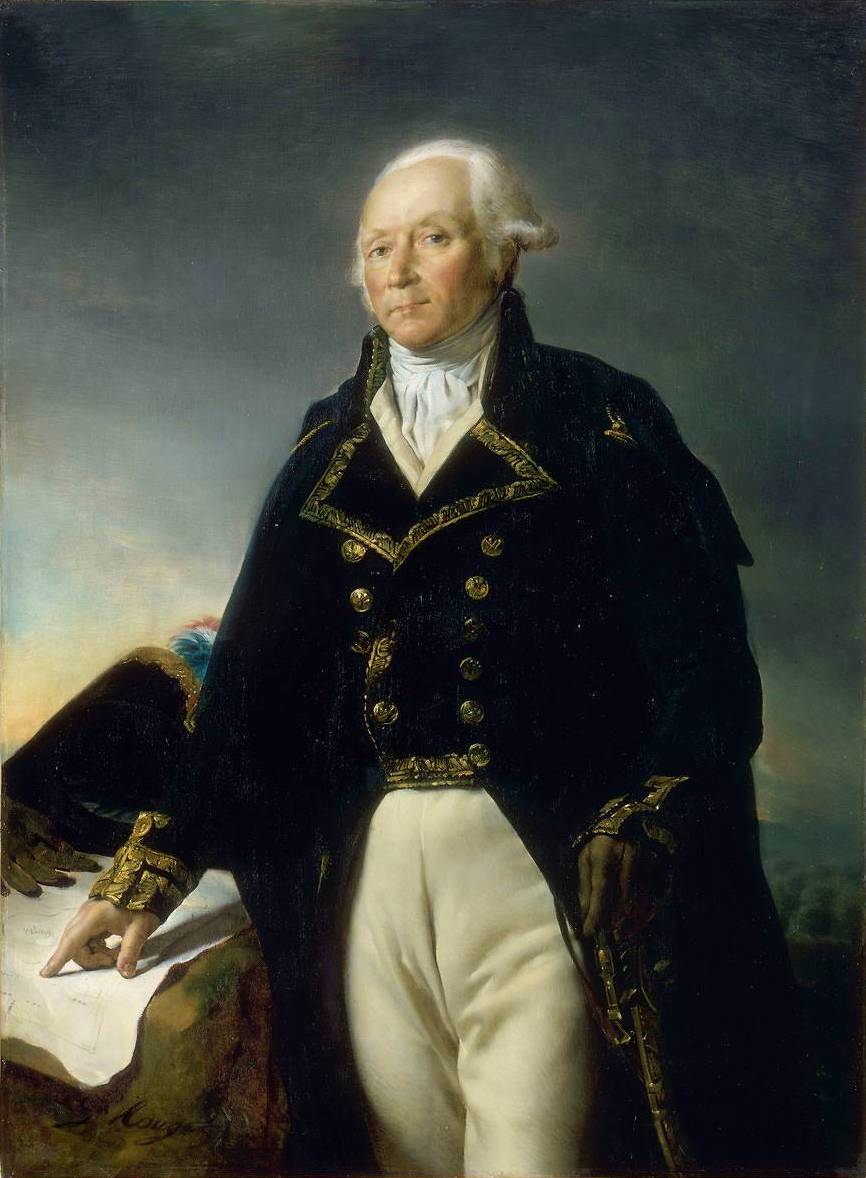
François Kellermann

Kellermann's new chief of staff was GB Louis-Alexandre Berthier who had been dismissed in July 1793 and only recalled to duty on 14 March 1795. Kellermann's aide-de-camps were his son François Étienne de Kellermann and Antoine Charles Louis de Lasalle. The Army of Italy's strategic situation was very awkward. It occupied narrow strip of coastline with its back to a sea usually controlled by the British Royal Navy. The army defended a chain of mountainous terrain with its base located on its left flank. Kellermann's two armies facing the Kingdom of Sardinia-Piedmont counted 45,000 effectives, of which 15,000 belonged to the Army of the Alps. Previously, the Sardinians had been weakly supported by their Austrian allies. However, by 1795 the Austrians fielded a full army in the Italian theater. De Vins exercised authority over both the Austrian and Sardinian armies.

The French right flank rested on the Ligurian Sea at Savona. From this place, the French defenses stretched west to include the Colle di San Giacomo, Monte Alto, Monte Settepani, and Colle del Melogno. The center division of the Army of Italy held the Col de Tende and the upper basin of the Roya River while the left division extended as far as Belvédère. To defend this line, Kellermann ordered fortifications to be constructed. Apparently, this order was carried out except on Massena's sector, so that the commanding general felt it necessary to write on 16 June, "Think once for all, my dear General, that the slightest negligence in war may have the greatest consequence." Massena began seriously fortifying only when the Austrians began massing in front of his positions on 18 June.

=== Action ===
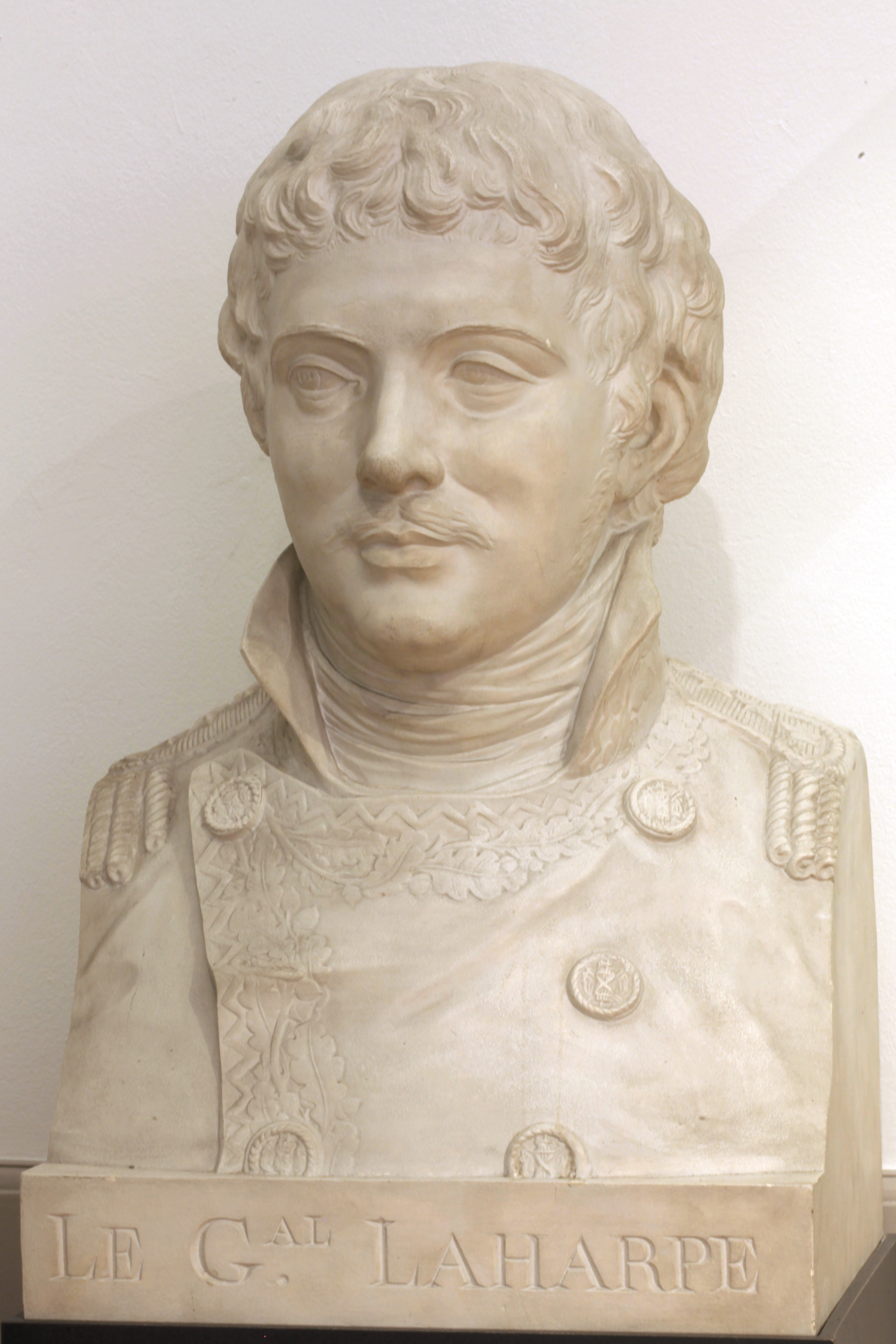
Amédée Laharpe

The port of Savona belonged to the Republic of Genoa which was neutral. Kellermann was convinced that the Austrians were going to seize the fortress of Savona, so he ordered GB Laharpe to storm the place. Laharpe and his superior GD Freytag believed that an assault would be repulsed, so a different strategy was tried. Laharpe stationed a French regiment in the suburb of Savona and was given permission by the Genoese fortress commander for French soldiers to take shelter in the covered way if threatened by the Austrians. Laharpe hoped that the Austrians might make a serious attack and thus allow the French to retreat into the fortress itself. In this way, they might gain control of the fortress. On the very early morning of 22 June, the regiment moved close to Savona, but was not attacked, so it returned to its own defenses. Laharpe ordered the regiment's commander to repeat the operation the next day and this time get his soldiers into the covered way. Accordingly, on 23 June the regiment moved close to the fortress and began skirmishing with the Austrians. The French soldiers retreated into the covered way where they were fired on by part of the garrison. Other Genoese fired on the Austrians, who did not press their attack. The French regiment remained in the covered way until 26 June when it was evacuated by sea to Vado. In any case, the Austrians were prevented from seizing Savona's fortress.

On 24 June 1795, de Vins mounted a major assault on the French defenses. From 24–26 June, Laharpe's brigade succeeded in repelling every Austrian attack in the coastal sector. Inland, the Austrians captured Monte Alto and the Colle di San Giacomo from Cervoni's brigade on 25 June, possibly because the French defenses had not been fully constructed. Cervoni's counterattack to recapture the Colle di San Giacomo failed. However, the Austrian soldiers got drunk on alcohol left by the French, panicked, and decamped. This allowed the French to briefly reoccupy the position before abandoning it to the Austrians on 26 June.

Farther west, GM Eugène-Guillaume Argenteau and 4,000 troops captured Monte Settepani though the Colle del Melogno defenses proved to be too strong. Kellermann and Massena conferred at Melogno, after which an unsuccessful attempt to recapture Monte Settepani was made. Kellermann then departed for Finale Ligure to meet with his chief of staff Berthier. Massena wished to draw reinforcements from the right flank to recapture Monte Settepani, but Kellermann refused. As historian Ramsay Weston Phipps pointed out, the Army of Italy's magazines were on the coast, and if these were captured, it meant the soldiers would starve. Massena pulled troops from his left flank forces and launched an assault on Monte Settepani on the afternoon of 27 June. This was carried out by three columns, one of which was led by Adjutant General Barthélemy Catherine Joubert. The Austrian and Hungarian defenders were fully prepared to receive the attack and a fog confused the French, so that it was repulsed.

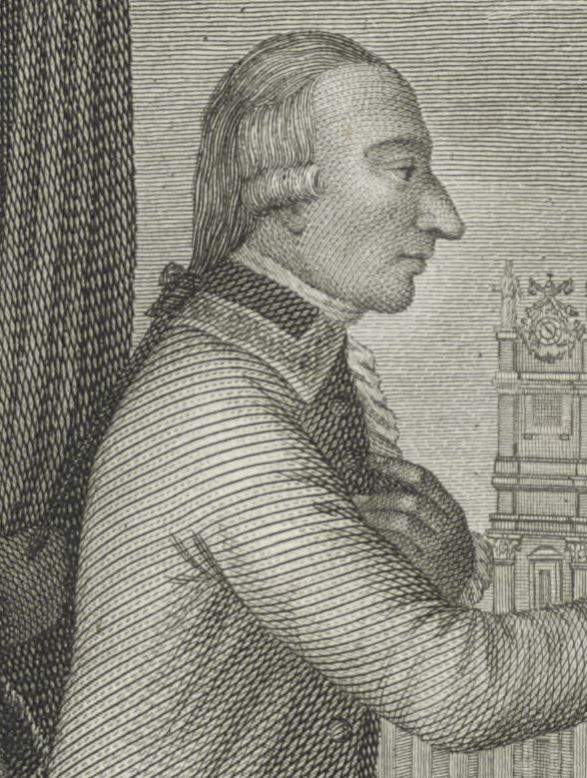
Michelangelo Colli

On 27 June, Colli's Sardinian troops drove Massena's center division from Monte Spinarda, which is between Garessio and Calizzano. This was the only other Coalition success because Colli's operations were not well-coordinated with de Vins and the French were fully entrenched near the Col de Tende. Kellermann ordered Massena's right wing to withdraw in two phases. The supply dumps at Vado and Finale were evacuated by sea while the one at Loano was also transferred farther west. By 5 July, the French right wing established its new defenses from Borghetto on the coast to Monte Galero (Note: Phipps stated that it was Monte Gale.) on the crest of the Ligurian Alps. Massena's two right flank divisions, 14,000 strong, held this line while Sérurier's 6,000-man division guarded the area around Ormea. The Army of Italy's center and left divisions held the same positions as before.

Also on 5 July, Sérurier with Massena's left division reported that the Colle dei Termini was partially captured and that his troops might have to retreat. Kellermann quickly called a council of war at Albenga with Massena, Laharpe, Berthier, and others to decide what to do if the Coalition forces seized Ponte di Nava. In that case, the Army of Italy might have to make a deep withdrawal to Sanremo or Ventimiglia, and contingent orders were drawn up. By some mistake, this message was dispatched to the Committee of Public Safety, leading that body to distrust Kellermann. In fact, late on 5 July, GB Louis Pelletier's brigade ousted its foes from their foothold, and Sérurier announced that the Colle dei Termini position was saved.

== Aftermath ==
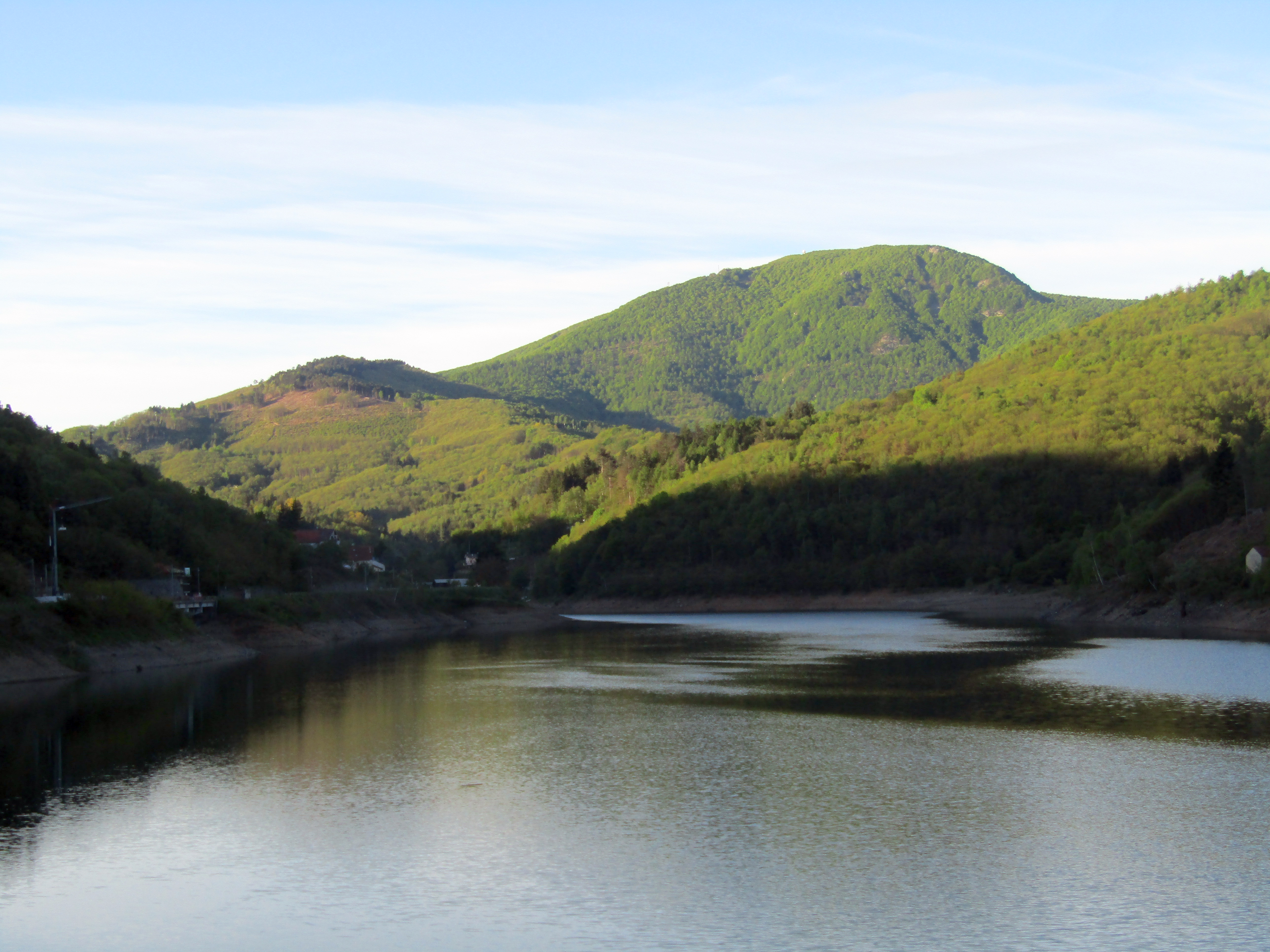
Monte Settepani is shown as viewed from Lake Osiglia.

The Coalition allies were exhausted by the fighting. They slowly followed the French withdrawal and immediately fortified their new positions. Kellermann stated that his troops showed "truly Republican courage" and believed that they inflicted more losses on the enemy than they sustained. He declared that he had merely "drawn in" his forces and was miffed that the operation was criticized by some persons as a retreat. The only Coalition trophies were 20 iron guns that the French left behind. Kellermann was not pleased at the way Garnier handled the left division, so he was replaced by Sérurier.

In May 1795, Bonaparte was transferred from his post as chief of artillery of the Army of Italy to command an infantry brigade in the Army of the West engaged in the War in the Vendée. Bonaparte had no intention of fighting in a counter-insurgency campaign and sent in his resignation. The French government reacted to its loss of territory in Italy by reappointing Bonaparte to his former rank and assigning him to the Bureau Topographique at the War Ministry. From his new post, Bonaparte soon produced a flow of strategic advice for the Army of Italy.

The Peace of Basel, signed on 22 July 1795, ended the War of the Pyrenees and freed up the French troops that had been fighting Spain and Portugal for service in Italy. A force of 10,000 troops led by GD Étienne Charlet, GD Pierre Augereau, GB Philippe Romain Ménard, and GB François Gilles Guillot was sent from the Army of the Eastern Pyrenees. However, local authorities retained many of these soldiers and the Army of Italy received only a fraction of this force, which arrived in October. An earlier batch of soldiers from the Army of the Eastern Pyrenees led by GB Claude Perrin Victor arrived in September. Another contingent of 5,000 infantry and 2,000 cavalry was sent to the Army of Italy from the Army of the Rhine and Moselle. On 29 September 1795, Kellermann was replaced in command of the Army of Italy by Schérer.

== Notes ==
Footnotes

Citations
