= Battle of Loano =

1795 battle of the Alps Campaign

- Part of the Alps Campaign
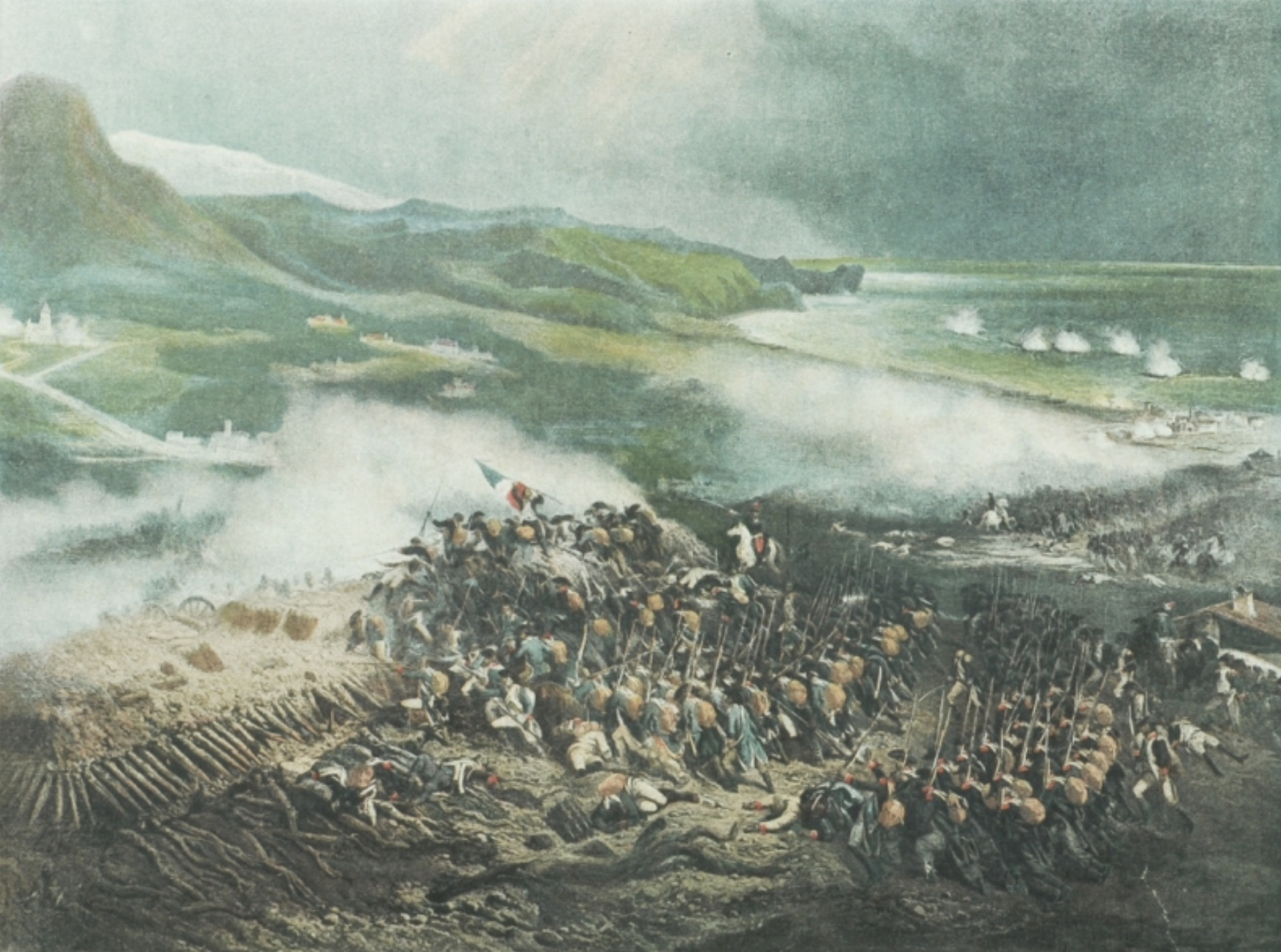
- Painting of the battle by Hippolyte Bellangé
Date	23–24 November 1795
Location	Loano, Liguria, Italy 44.1167°N 8.2500°E
Result	French victory

Belligerents
French First Republic	Habsburg Austria; Kingdom of Sardinia

Commanders and leaders
Barthélemy Schérer; André Masséna; Pierre Augereau	Count of Wallis (Kingdom of Sardinia) Michelangelo Colli

Strength
25,000–40,000	18,000–53,000

Casualties and losses
1,700–3,000	7,000–7,500; 48–80 guns
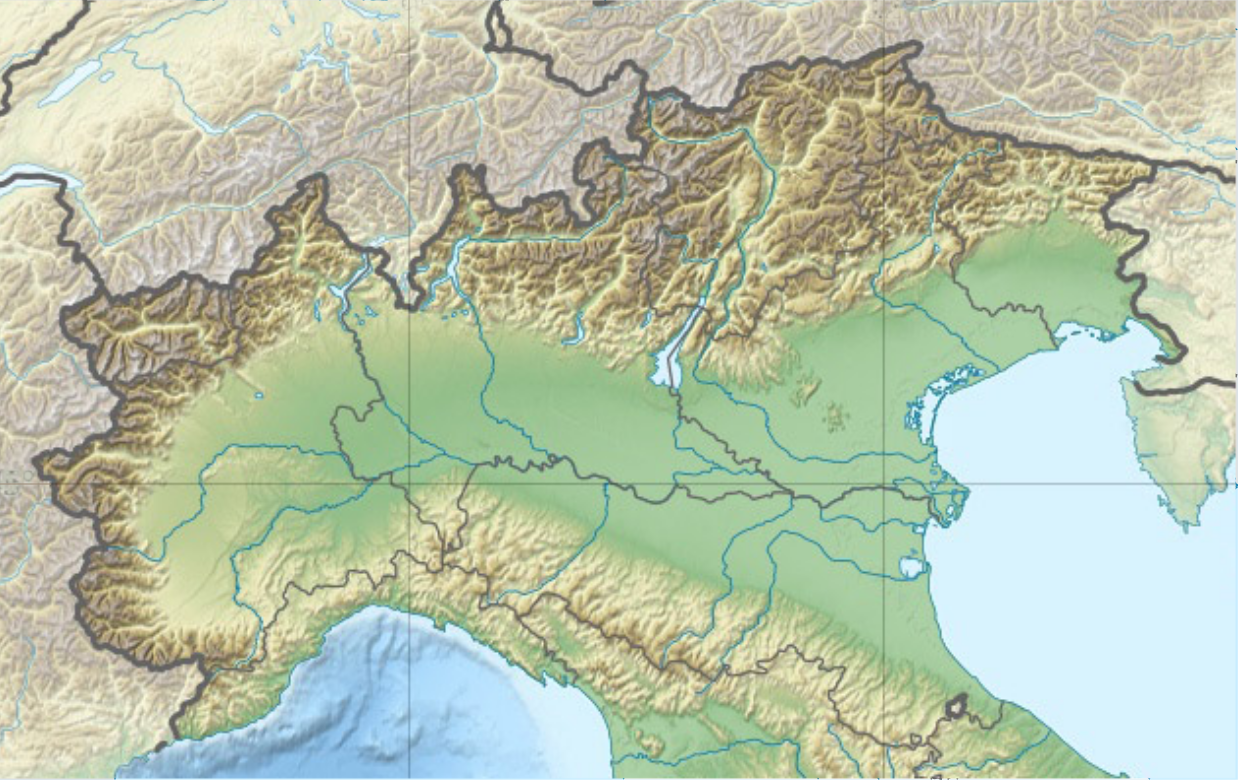
- Location within Northern Italy Battle of Loano (Europe)

The Battle of Loano (23–24 November 1795) saw the French Army of Italy led by General of Division (GD) Barthélemy Louis Joseph Schérer attack the Allied armies of Habsburg Austria and the Kingdom of Sardinia-Piedmont led by Feldzeugmeister (FZM) Olivier, Count of Wallis during the War of the First Coalition. The assault took the Austrians by surprise since it occurred so late in the year. Additionally, the previous Austrian commander resigned the day before the attack. While the French left flank troops pinned down the Sardinian forces opposing them, the French center broke through the Allied center, forcing the Austrians to retreat. Meanwhile, the French right flank forces steadily pressed back the Austrians on the coast. The French gained a more favorable position, but Schérer did not exploit his victory. André Masséna distinguished himself during this battle and is credited with the French victory.

== Context ==
After detecting that his Coalition foes were planning an offensive, French commander GD Pierre Jadart Dumerbion launched an operation in mid-September 1794 that took his opponents by surprise. Using a plan prepared by General of Brigade (GB) Napoleon Bonaparte, the French defeated the Austrians under the Count of Wallis in the First Battle of Dego on 21 September. The French army then obeyed its orders from Paris not to persist in an offensive. As the French troops withdrew to a more defensible position, Bonaparte noted that the road running from the port of Savona to the interior was usable by artillery, a piece of information that would prove useful to him in the April 1796 Montenotte campaign. The French army took up a defense line running from Ormea east to Colle San Bernardo and then to the Ligurian Sea at Vado. Dumerbion praised Bonaparte, "It is to the ability of the General of Artillery that I owe the clever combinations which have secured our success."

GD Schérer replaced Dumerbion as commander of the Army of Italy on 21 November 1794. GD François Christophe de Kellermann assumed command of both the Army of Italy and the Army of the Alps on 6 May 1795. Also in May, Bonaparte was ordered away from the Army of Italy. On 24–26 June 1795, the Coalition commander FZM Joseph Nikolaus De Vins attacked the French positions in the Battle of Monte Settepani. Though repulsed near the coast, in the inland sector the Austrians captured Monte Settepani, Colle di San Giacomo, and Monte Alto. Kellermann ordered a withdrawal, taking care to evacuate his army's supplies from Vado, Finale, and Loano. On 9 July, the French army took up its new defense line from Borghetto Santo Spirito on the coast to Monte Galero, then west to Ormea.

In July 1795, Kellermann mustered 31,193 soldiers in the Army of Italy and 17,108 men in the Army of the Alps. From these numbers, one must deduct garrisons and the sick. Much of Kellermann's energy was expended trying to feed troops who were often on the brink of starvation because of the British Royal Navy blockade of the coast and the nearly bankrupt French government. However, the Peace of Basel with the Kingdom of Spain on 22 July 1795 allowed the Army of Italy to be reinforced. Several thousand more reinforcements arrived from the Army of the Rhine and Moselle. The food supply was placed on a better basis at least for a few months.

The Austrians and Sardinian armies did not cooperate very well, so De Vins was placed in overall command of both armies. On 18 September 1795, De Vins attacked the French lines with 40,000 troops. On the French side, GD André Massena held the right flank with 24,000 men, GD François Macquard defended the center with 6,000 troops, and GD Jean-Mathieu-Philibert Sérurier held the left flank with 5,000 soldiers. The Sardinians faced Sérurier, Generalmajor (GM) Eugène-Guillaume Argenteau faced Macquard, and Wallis faced Massena. Near Monte Sambucco, the Sardinians gained a momentary success, but the French under Colonel Louis de Saint-Hilaire counterattacked in a fog and drove them off. All of the other Allied attacks failed. (Note: Only Cust described the 18 September 1795 battle. Boycott-Brown, Chandler, Phipps, and Smith did not mention it at all (Cust, pp. 303–304).)

== Battle ==
=== Preparations ===
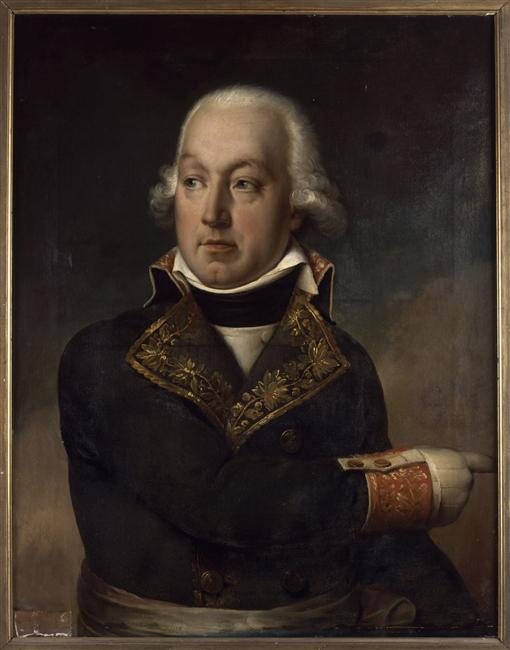
Barthélemy Schérer

On 29 September 1795, Schérer replaced Kellermann in command of the Army of Italy. Kellermann was demoted to commanding only the Army of the Alps. In early October, the Army of Italy with 33,000 soldiers faced 30,000 Austrians and 12,000 Sardinians led by De Vins. At about this time, GD Charles-Pierre Augereau's division on the right flank, consisting of reinforcements from the Spanish front, numbered 6,961 men. Sérurier's division on the left flank counted 5,155 soldiers. In the center, Massena controlled 13,276 troops, split between the divisions of GD Étienne Charlet and GD Amédée Emmanuel François Laharpe and a reserve under GD Guilin Laurent Bizanet. Massena's and Sérurier's soldiers were originally from the Army of Italy. These active divisions totaled 25,392 infantry but did not include cavalry or artillery. It also did not include another division on the far left that held the Col de Tende.

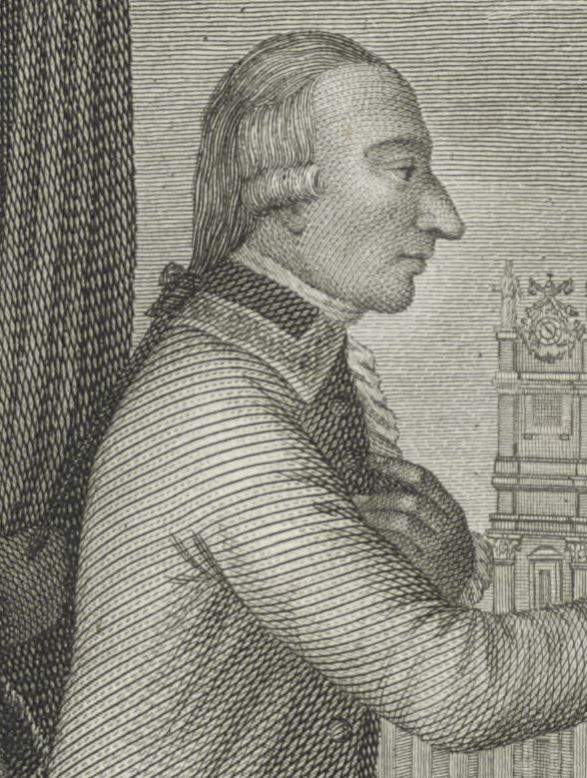
Michelangelo Colli

Even though the Sardinian army was led by an Austrian officer, Feldmarschall-Leutnant (FML) Michelangelo Alessandro Colli-Marchi, relations between the Austrians and the Sardinians remained touchy. Bonaparte, then a military planner at the Bureau Topographique, urged an attack by the Army of Italy to seize Vado. He was soon backed up by the Committee of Public Safety. Schérer wanted to execute Kellermann's plan to advance up the Tanaro valley, but frequent delays prevented it from being carried out. On 17 November, Charlet's division attacked the Austro-Sardinians at Campo di Pietri, surprising them and capturing three cannons and 500 prisoners.

A violent storm and heavy snowfall occurred on 18 November, halting further movements. Desiring to do something before winter prevented all operations, Schérer chose an assault plan presented by Massena. While Sérurier's division kept the Allies in his front occupied, Massena's divisions would sever the connection between the Allied right and left wings. After breaking through, Massena's troops would turn to their right and hit the flank of the Allies defending against Augereau's division. The French acted as though they were taking up winter quarters while they were really massing troops for Massena's assault. On 22 November, De Vins handed over command of the Allied army to Wallis. Colli's chief of staff Colonel Joseph Henri Costa de Beauregard reported that De Vins was ill with scurvy. Believing that military operations were finished for the season, Wallis permitted his officers to attend a ball at Finale.

=== Action ===
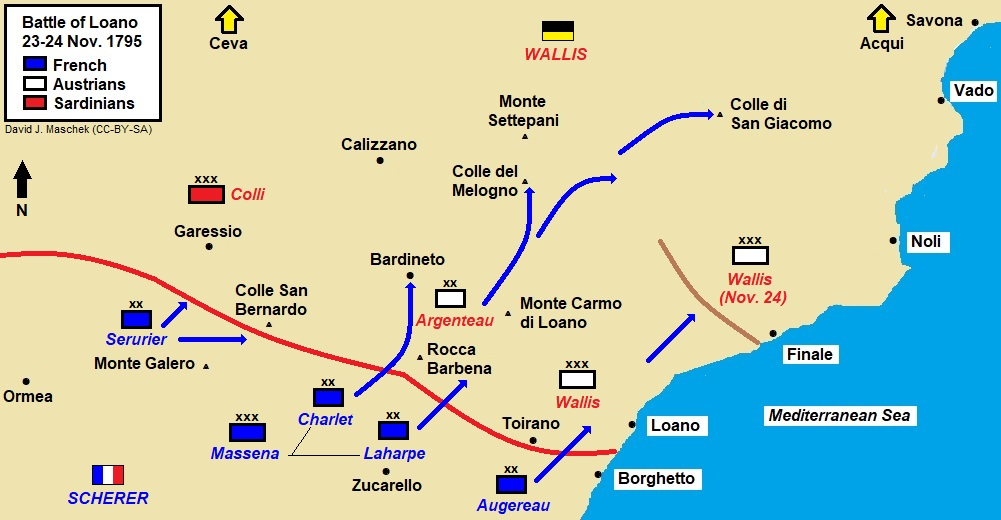
Battle of Loano 1795 map

Sérurier's division was based on Ormea, Massena's divisions operated from Zuccarello, and Augereau's division was stationed at Borghetto on the coast. On 23 November 1795, Sérurier's division attacked Colli's Sardinians in the Tanaro valley. Sérurier personally led his soldiers to attack Colle San Bernardo, but the French were repulsed after bitter fighting. Sérurier kept the Sardinians busy all this day and the next. Despite the setback, Schérer assured the division commander, "That was all that I wanted". (Note: Phipps stated that the battle started on 22 November (Phipps, pp. 262–264) while Boycott-Brown (p. 110), Chandler (p. 38), Cust (p. 304), and Smith (p. 108) all gave a date of 23 November.)

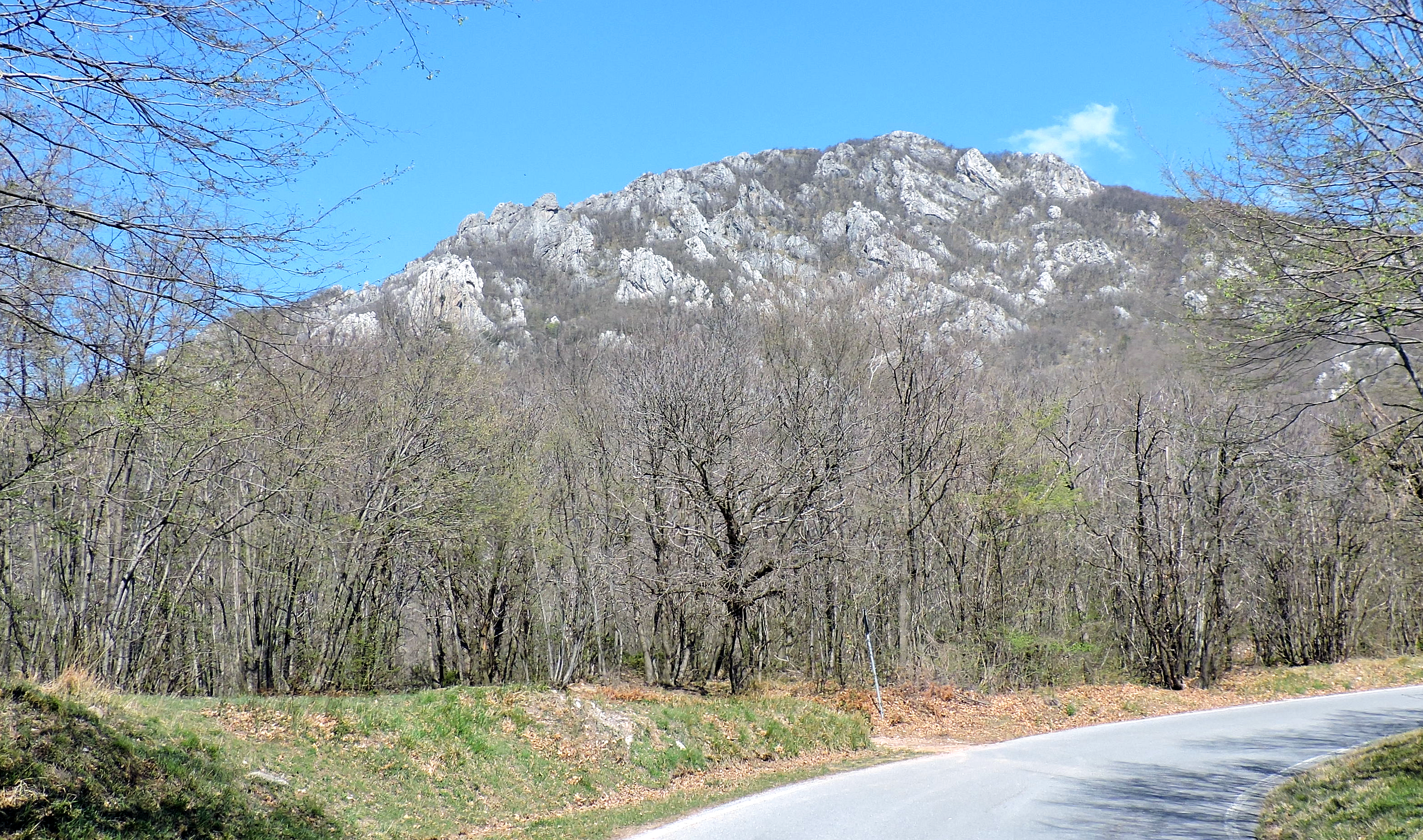
South face of Rocca Barbena

At 4:00 am on 23 November, Massena's troops began their assault on the Allied field fortifications to the southeast of Colle San Bernardo. The divisions of Charlet and Laharpe took part in this assault against Argenteau's defending troops. Charlet was mortally wounded and Massena took control of his division, also committing the reserve. GB Barthélemy Catherine Joubert described how he and GB Jean Joseph Magdeleine Pijon each led about 600 picked troops to attack one of Argenteau's redoubts armed with seven cannons. Charging through withering fire, and without firing, the French burst into the redoubt. In the melee, Joubert demanded that an enemy officer surrender, and when that man found that the Frenchman was a general, he immediately threw down his sword and asked for mercy. After seizing these positions, Massena next directed his troops to seize Rocca Barbena. The French captured Rocca Barbena after a prolonged struggle. Two hours later, they seized the town of Bardineto, forcing their foes back to Calizzano in the Bormida valley. During the fighting, Lieutenant Colonel Louis-Gabriel Suchet's battalion captured the imposing height of Monte Carmo di Loano.

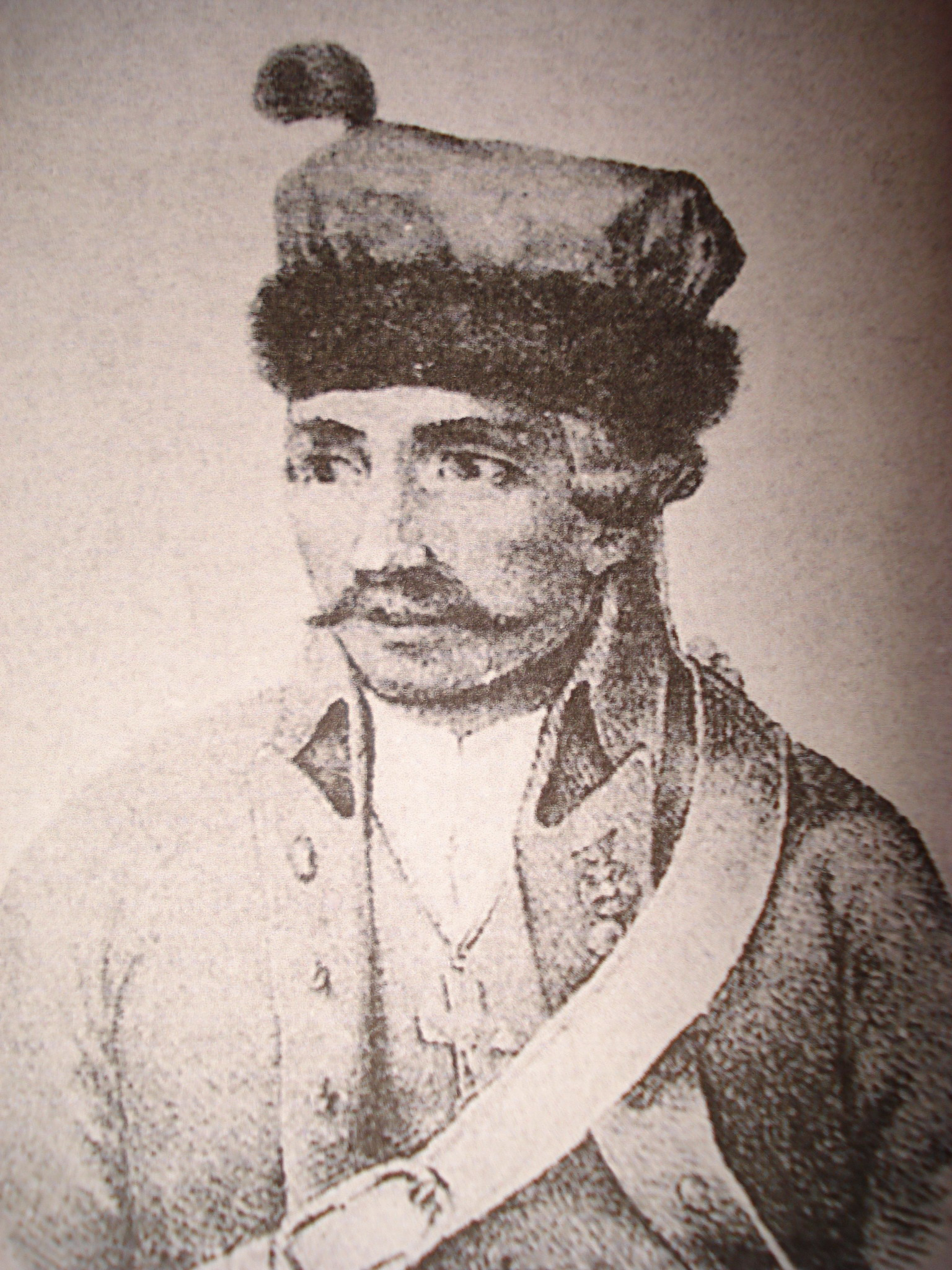
Mathias Rukavina

At dawn, accompanied by Schérer, Augereau attacked the Allied left wing at Loano, supported by the fire of French gunboats offshore. Augereau's division consisted of four brigades under GBs Pierre Banel, Jean-Baptiste Dominique Rusca, Claude-Victor Perrin, and Elzéar Auguste Cousin de Dommartin. Wallis' position was defended by three fortified mounds, batteries posted in olive groves, and the Chartreuse at Toirano. Banel's brigade seized Toirano, but while attacking the Chartreuse, Banel was wounded and handed over command to Colonel Jean Lannes. The French surprised and captured two of the fortified mounds but were repulsed at the Greater Castellaro which was held by GM Mathias Rukavina von Boynograd and 1,200 Austrians. Rusca's brigade failed to take the Greater Castellaro, but pressed forward. Banel's brigade captured a battery in front of the Chartreuse, forcing GM Michael von Ternyey's troops into the Chartreuse. Reinforced by refugees from Argenteau's disintegrating command, Ternyey sortied from the Chatreuse and recaptured the battery. Hearing fire erupt in the rear, Augereau sent back Dommartin's brigade which drove Ternyey's soldiers into the Chartreuse again.

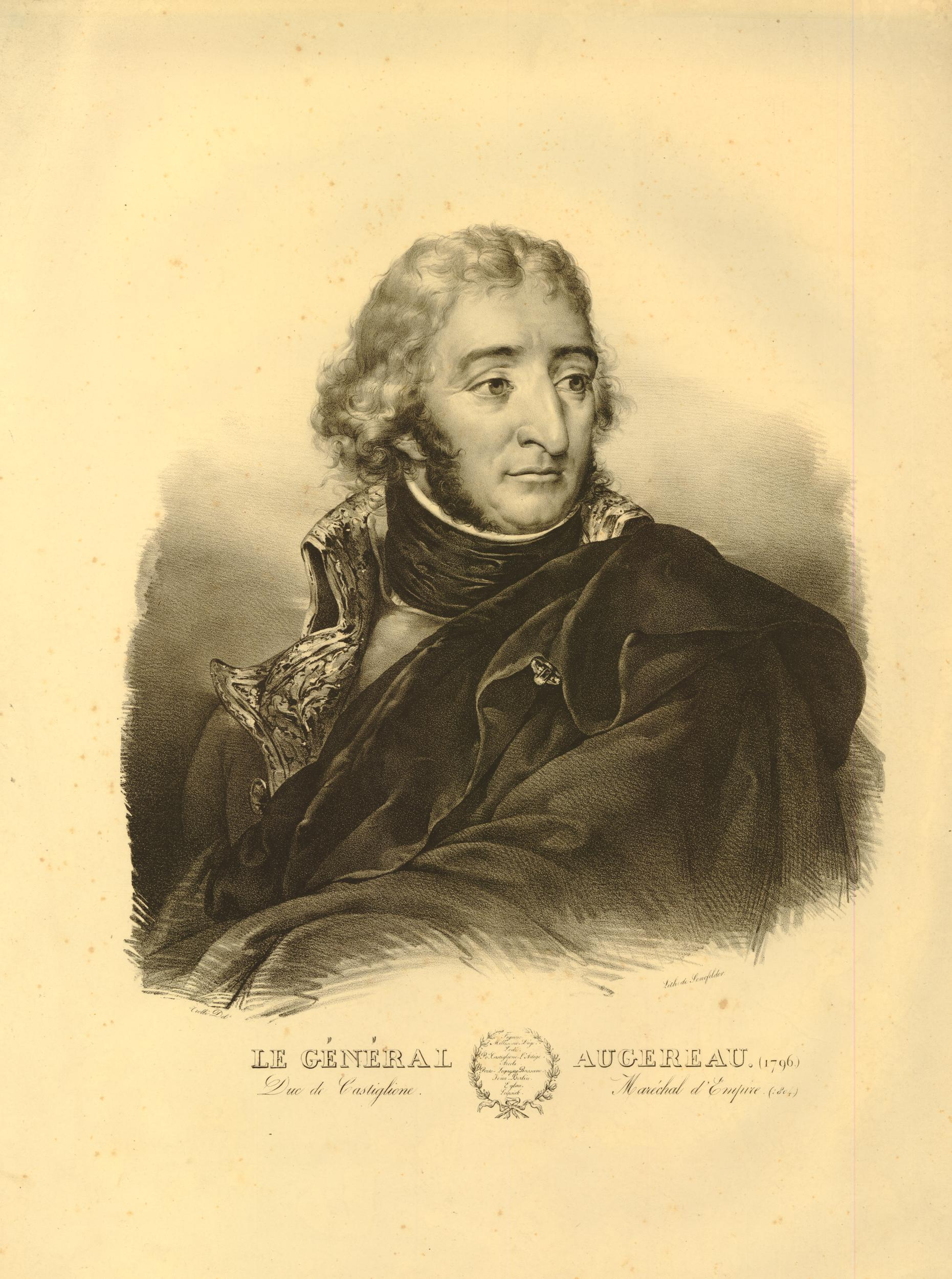
Pierre Augereau

After Rusca failed to capture the Greater Castellaro, Victor's brigade was placed to contain it. Augereau summoned Rukavina to surrender the Greater Castellaro, but the Austrian insisted on getting free passage to Wallis' position, which was refused. Pointing at Victor's brigade, Rukavina said, "There is where I mean to pass", and led his soldiers out in close column of attack. The Austrian column bored right through Victor's troops, who rallied and fired into Rukavina's men. In the end, Rukavina escaped to join Wallis, though half his soldiers became casualties. It went otherwise with Ternyey, who surrendered the Chartreuse to Dommartin. Wallis brought the Austrian cavalry into action, which briefly halted Augereau's advance. However, Rusca drew the cavalry into an ambush, driving them back. Wallis evacuated Loano at 3:00 pm and ordered the Austrian left wing to fall back to Monte Carmelo. At 4:00 pm, Schérer ordered Augereau's men to halt and camp for the night. He knew that Rocca Barbena and Bardineto were captured, but was unaware of Massena's subsequent progress.

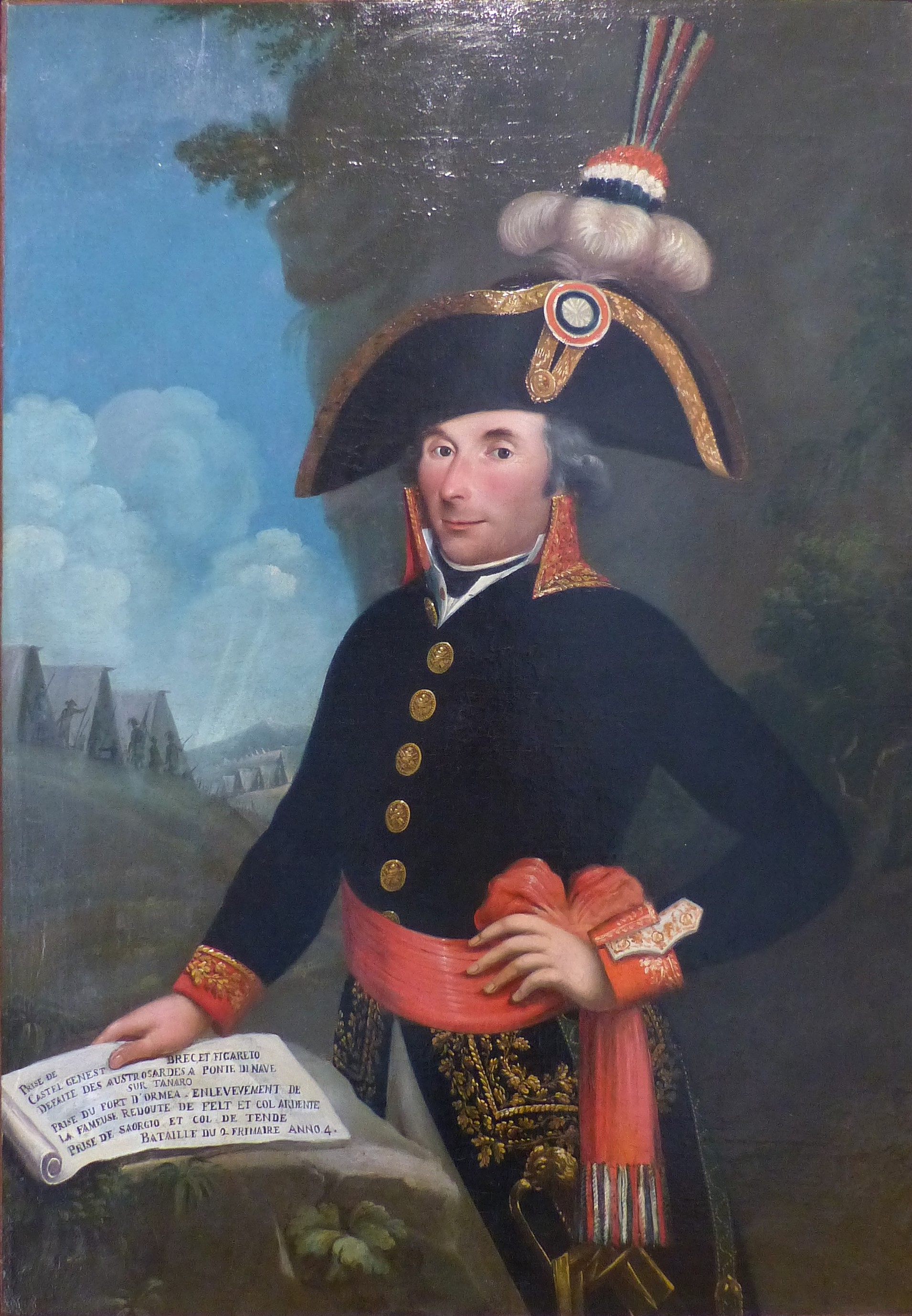
André Massena

Massena left enough troops to hold Bardineto and headed for Monte Settepani and the Colle del Melogno with a small force, hoping to get there before Argenteau. Meanwhile, GB Jean-Baptiste Cervoni set out in pursuit with three battalions and prevented Argenteau's fugitives from rallying. Ultimately, Argenteau ordered his troops to retreat to Ceva. Massena caught up with Cervoni's brigade at the Colle del Melogno at 11:00 pm, and at midnight he pressed on with 2,000 men to seize what the French called the San Pantaleone heights. This was the ridge extending down from Monte Settepani toward Finale. Wallis hoped to continue the battle the next day and sent a message to Argenteau to hold Monte Settepani and the Colle del Melogno, but the courier was captured by Pijon's troops.

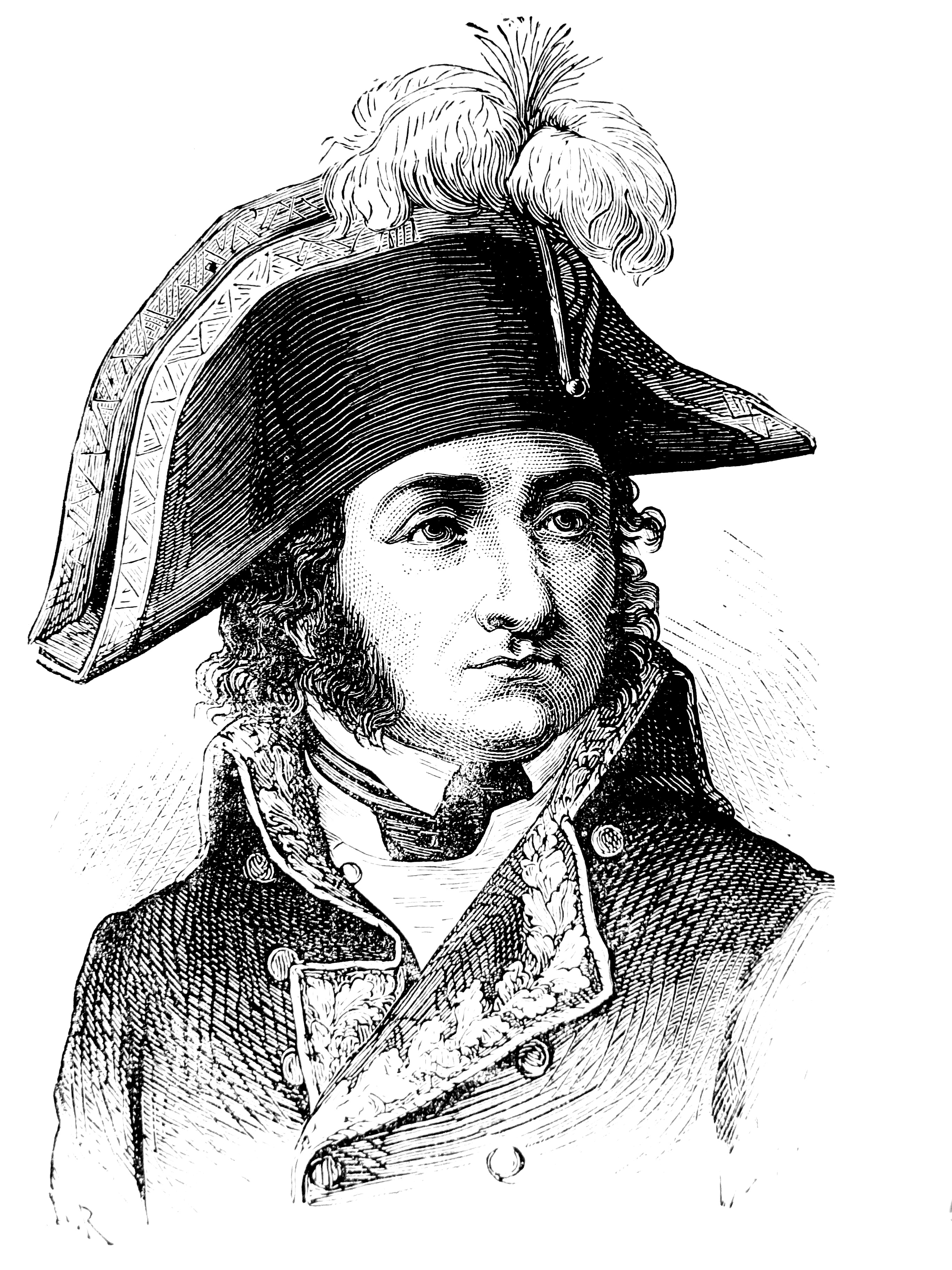
Barthelemy Joubert

Finally hearing that his center was overwhelmed, Wallis withdrew during the night to the San Pantaleone heights. On 24 November, Massena sent a message to Schérer, but the French army commander did not receive it until noon. Massena got some reinforcements from Laharpe's division, but by noon he still had only 4,300 troops available. With these soldiers, Massena harassed Wallis so that the Austrian commander sent away his artillery by what he assumed was a safe route via the Colle di San Giacomo. Suspecting that his opponent would retreat by this route, Massena ordered Joubert to seize the defile. The artillery convoy set out under the command of GM Philipp Pittoni von Dannenfeld and found itself blocked by Joubert's soldiers, who had marched through a hailstorm. Pittoni's soldiers manned an old entrenchment and waited for further orders. By the time Pittoni tried to execute Wallis' orders to withdraw to Finale, Massena also blocked the road behind the column. Taking the horses, Pittoni's men abandoned 19 guns and the wagon train and fled cross-country.

As Wallis retreated along the coast road, his columns became the target of the French gunboats. After being pursued by Dommartin's brigade, Wallis reached Vado where he rallied his troops. On 25 November, Schérer reinforced his left flank under Sérurier with troops from Augereau's division. Despite this, Colli maintained a spirited defense of Garessio. When he heard about Wallis' defeat, Colli ordered a retreat on 28 November to his entrenched camp at Ceva, leaving behind his cannons.

== Results ==
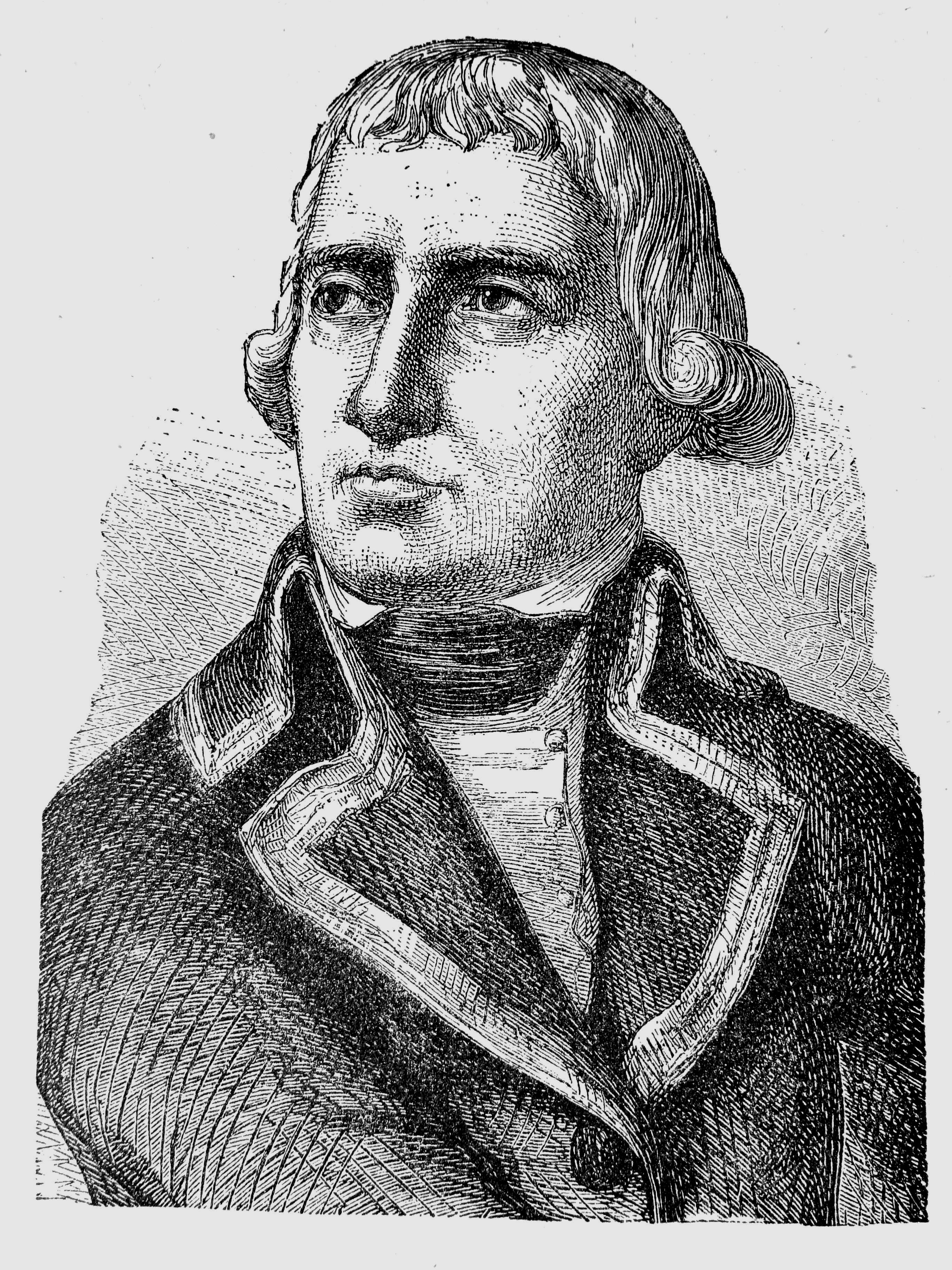
Philibert Sérurier

Wallis continued to retreat, reaching Savona on 25 November, Dego on 27 November, and Acqui on 29 November. Rukavina led the Austrian rearguard, marching via Altare and Carcare, he arrived at Dego on 28 November. Shortly after occupying Savona, the French halted pursuit due to lack of provisions. The triumph was not followed-up because of Schérer's caution, a "poorly conducted" pursuit, over-stretched supply lines, and the non-arrival of promised reinforcements. However, the capture of Savona made supply from Genoa easier.

Charles Mullié credited the French with 40,000 men and the Coalition with 53,000. Historian Digby Smith reported that the French had 25,000 men engaged, while the Allied total was 18,000 soldiers. Of these, the French lost 2,500 killed and wounded, plus 500 captured. Allied losses numbered 3,000 killed and wounded, plus 4,000 men, 48 cannons, and 5 colors captured. Ramsay Weston Phipps stated that the French admitted losses of 500 killed and 1,150–1,200 wounded. The Austrians sustained losses of 3,500 men killed and wounded and 4,000 captured. They also lost 5 colors and 48 field guns, plus 17 more guns abandoned at Vado. Edward Cust asserted that the Austrian-Sardinian armies lost 80 guns and abandoned large supply depots at Finale, Vado, and Savona. On the Austrian side, Argenteau received much of the blame for the defeat.

After the debacle, the Sardinian generals urged King Victor Amadeus III to conclude peace with Frence. The Sardinians duly entered into negotiations, but the king rejected all French proposals on 27 January 1796. However, the Austrian government was notified of what was going on and this led to increasing strain on the Austrian-Sardinian alliance. Schérer repositioned his army, placing Massena's two divisions (Laharpe and GD Jean-Baptiste Meynier) on the right flank, Augereau's division watching the Bormida valley, Sérurier's division watching the Tanaro valley, Macquard's division at the Col de Tende, and GD Pierre Dominique Garnier's division on the extreme left flank. On 4 February 1796, Schérer asked to be replaced and on 2 March, the French government selected Bonaparte. The new commander arrived on 27 March 1796.

== Commentary ==
The historian Phipps questioned why Schérer authorized Augereau to attack early in the morning, when the plan was for Massena to break through in the center and then strike the inland flank of the Allied left wing. In the event, Augereau's early attack pushed back Wallis' left wing so that it was out of reach of any possible flanking move by Massena.

== Notes ==
Footnotes

Citations
