= Étienne Charlet =

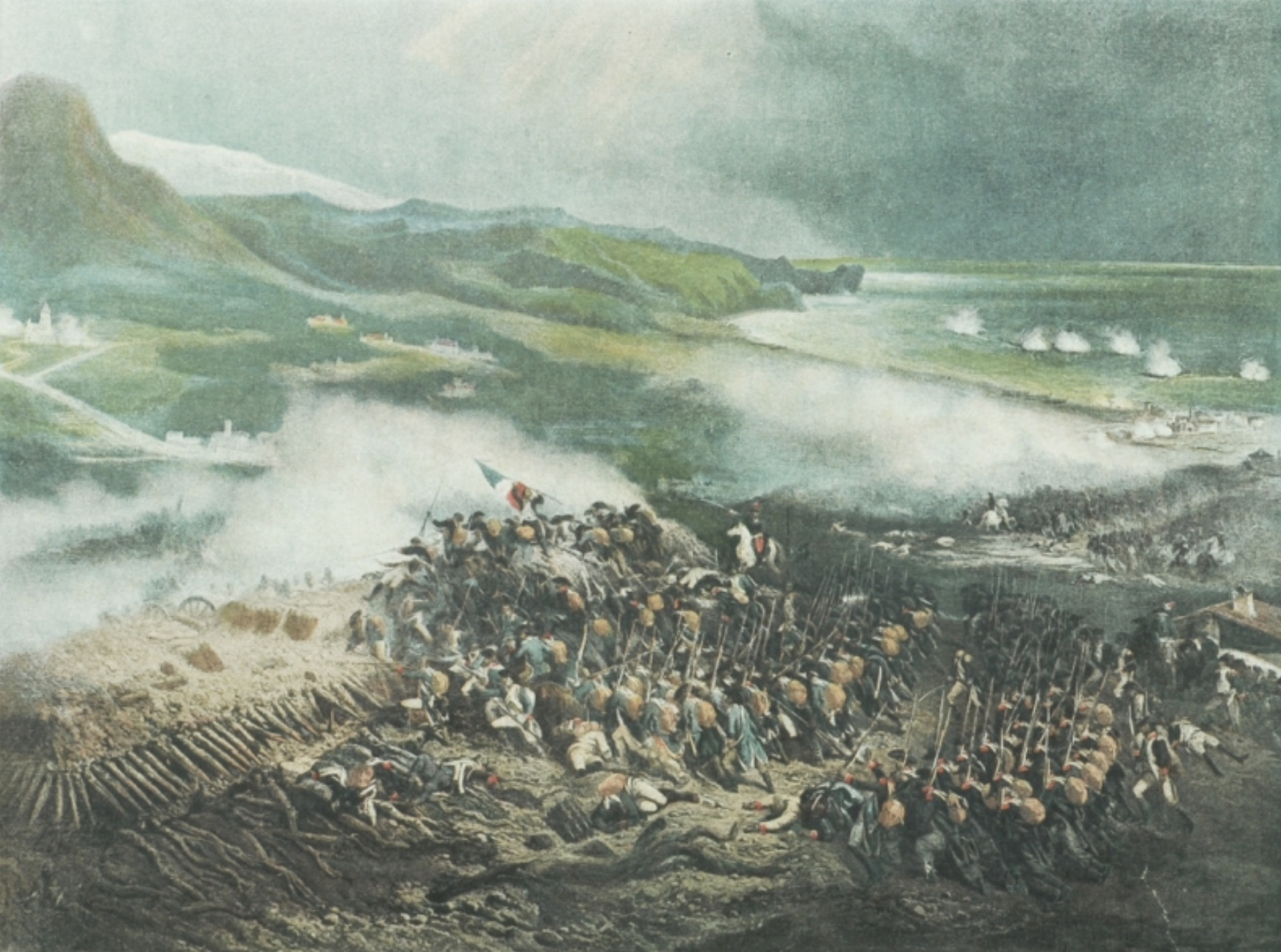
- The Battle of Loano, where Charlet was mortally wounded
- Born: 8 April 1756; Dijon, France
- Died: 27 November 1795 (aged 39) Loano, Italy
- Allegiance: Kingdom of France; France
- Branch: Cavalry, Infantry
- Service years: (Kingdom of France) 1773–1785 (France) 1792–1795
- Rank: General of Division
- Conflicts: American Revolutionary War; Great Siege of Gibraltar; War of the Pyrenees; Battle of Bascara; War of the First Coalition; Battle of Loano

Étienne Charlet (French pronunciation: [etjɛn ʃaʁlɛ] 8 April 1756 – 27 November 1795) became a division commander during the French Revolutionary Wars and was fatally wounded in action in Italy. He enlisted in the French Royal Army as a dragoon in 1773 and soon transferred to an infantry regiment. In 1782 during the Great Siege of Gibraltar he distinguished himself by saving a shipload of wounded French soldiers from drowning. He retired from military service three years later but joined the Paris National Guard in 1789. He became a captain in 1792 and during the War of the Pyrenees he was rapidly promoted to general of division by the end of 1793, fighting at Bascara in June 1795. Transferred to the Italian theater, he was shot down while leading his division at Loano and died five days later.

== Early career ==
Étienne Charlet was born at Dijon, France on 8 April 1756. He enlisted in the King's Dragoon Regiment in 1773 and transferred to the Penthièvre Infantry Regiment on 7 February 1774. He was promoted to corporal on 21 March 1775 and to quartermaster sergeant on 26 March 1776. As such, he served at sea during the American Revolutionary War in 1780–1783. On 5 September 1782 during the Siege of Gibraltar, he was given the responsibility of transporting a large number of sick French soldiers aboard the ship La Flore to the Saint-Marie hospital in Spain. The vessel was wrecked within sight of Cádiz and Charlet managed to get ashore in a boat. From there, he organized a successful effort to rescue the shipwrecked soldiers aboard La Flore. For this act of heroism, he was awarded a medal. He left military service on 28 November 1785.

== War of the First Coalition ==
The French Revolution prompted Charlet to rejoin the army. On 14 July 1789, he enlisted in the Paris National Guard. On 19 June 1791, he became a lieutenant in the Gendarmerie at Neuilly. On 16 September 1792, he became captain in the Légion de Pyrenées. On 28 July 1793 he was promoted lieutenant colonel and on 8 September 1793 he was elevated in rank to chef de brigade (colonel). An order of battle from 1 September 1793 showed the Légion de Pyrenées among the list of units in the Army of the Eastern Pyrenees, fighting in the War of the Pyrenees.

On 4 October 1793, Charlet was provisionally appointed general of brigade and on 20 December 1793, he was elevated in rank to general of division. Charlet's name does not appear in the orders of battle for the Second Battle of Boulou or for the Battle of the Black Mountain. However, the French Cerdagne division was practically independent of the Army of the Eastern Pyrenees. In June 1794, this division counted 12,886 men and was led by François Amédée Doppet when it raided the city of Ripoll. On 15 September 1794, Doppet became ill and handed over command of the Cerdagne division to Charlet. (Note: The sources indicated that Charlet served in the Cerdagne division. The only pre-1795 operation where the Cerdagne division joined the main body of the Army of the Eastern Pyrenees was the Battle of Truillas on 22 September 1793. However, no source stated that Charlet fought at Truillas. (Phipps, p. 158 & Smith, p. 57))

In the First Battle of Bascara on 1 March 1795, commander Catherine-Dominique de Pérignon ordered the army to advance in two columns across the Fluvià River. Charlet's force crossed the Fluvià at Besalú and marched to Serinyà where it was confronted by a large Spanish force led by Gonzalo O'Farrill. Charlet was soon joined by Charles-Pierre Augereau's troops and the two forces engaged in battle. When O'Farrill sent his cavalry to outflank the French, Augereau and Charlet retreated. The next day, they found that the second French column was defeated, so they abandoned Besalú. On 25 April, Charlet was ordered to mount a diversionary attack on Camprodon. Later in the campaign, Charlet did not attempt to advance because the Spanish forces opposing his division had been heavily reinforced. On 26 July 1795, Gregorio García de la Cuesta with 7,000 Spanish soldiers stormed Puigcerdà and captured its French garrison. The next day, Cuesta and 9,000 Spanish forced the garrison of Bellver de Cerdanya to surrender. These French defeats in the Cerdagne occurred before news arrived of the Peace of Basel, which was signed on 22 July 1795.

When the war with Spain ended, 10,000 men in four divisions, including one commanded by Charlet, were ordered to march to reinforce the Army of Italy. However, many of these troops deserted when they passed near their homes and some were diverted to other locations, so that only half of this reinforcement reached the Army of Italy by October 1795.

== Death ==
Barthélemy Louis Joseph Schérer took command of the Army of Italy on 29 September 1795. Schérer reorganized the army, placing the two divisions of Charlet and Amédée Emmanuel François Laharpe and a reserve in the Center under the overall leadership of André Massena. Charlet's division was made up of two brigades under Philippe Romain Ménard and Jean-Baptiste Cervoni. Ménard's brigade included the 13th Provisional Demi-Brigade (516 men), 14th Provisional Demi-Brigade (649), Éclaireurs (800), and 216 sappers. Cervoni's brigade consisted of the 11th Grenadier Battalion (440 men), 16th Light Infantry Demi-Brigade (619), 79th Line Infantry Demi-Brigade (634), 3rd Battalion/122nd Line Infantry Demi-Brigade (208), 2nd Battalion/6th Provisional Demi-Brigade (108), and a detachment of 8th Light Infantry Demi-Brigade (144).

Charlet's division carried out a successful preliminary attack on 17 November 1795 at Campo di Preti. A heavy snowfall stopped this operation, so Schérer adopted a plan proposed by Massena to break through the center of the Austro-Sardinian defenses. The Battle of Loano was fought on 23–24 November. On the first day, Massena's two divisions assaulted the Austro-Sardinian lines southeast of the Colle San Bernardo. Charlet led his soldiers through the opposing defenses, but was shot in the head. Massena took direct control of Charlet's division and captured Rocca Barbena and Bardineto. Late that night, Cervoni's brigade seized Colle del Melogno. Charlet died of his wound on 27 November 1795.

== See also ==
- Médaille (2020). "Médaille offerte à Etienne Charlet". Paris: Louvre. Medal awarded to Etienne Charlet for his heroism.

== Notes ==
Footnotes

Citations
