= Eugène-Guillaume Argenteau =

Austrian general

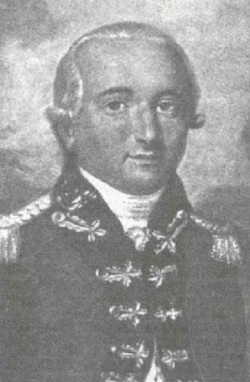
- Eugène-Guillaume Argenteau
- Born: 30 December 1743; Huy, Austrian Netherlands
- Died: 4 May 1819 (aged 75); Brno or Vienna, Austrian Empire
- Military career
- Allegiance: Habsburg monarchy Austrian Empire
- Branch: Infantry
- Service years: 1760–1819
- Rank: Feldzeugmeister
- Conflicts: Seven Years' War; Battle of Torgau; Storm of Schweidnitz; Austro-Turkish War (1788–1791); Siege of Belgrade; War of the First Coalition; Second Battle of Saorgio; Battle of Loano; Battle of Montenotte; Second Battle of Dego; War of the Third Coalition; Battle of Caldiero
- Awards: Military Order of Maria Theresa, KC
- Other work: Inhaber, Infantry Regt. Nr. 35

Eugène-Guillaume-Alexis, comte de Mercy d'Argenteau or Eugen Gillis Wilhelm Graf Mercy d'Argenteau or Eugen Gillis Alexis Argenteau (30 December 1743 – 4 May 1819) joined the Austrian army in 1760 and fought in the Seven Years' War. In 1784 he became the commander of an Austrian infantry regiment. He led the unit during the Austro-Turkish War at the 1789 Siege of Belgrade and was promoted to general officer. After the outbreak of the War of the First Coalition, he was loaned to the Kingdom of Sardinia-Piedmont. He fought at Saorgio in 1794 and Monte Settepani and Loano in 1795. His division faced Napoleon Bonaparte and was badly defeated in the Montenotte campaign in April 1796. During the War of the Third Coalition he led several divisions at Caldiero in 1805. He retired from the army in 1808 but became inhaber (proprietor) of an Austrian infantry regiment from 1809 until his death.

== Early career ==
Eugène-Guillaume-Alexis Mercy d'Argenteau was born on 30 December 1743 at Huy in the Austrian Netherlands, and what is now Belgium. In 1760, he joined the Mercy d'Argenteau Infantry Regiment Nr. 56 in 1760. The regiment's inhaber (proprietor) was Anton Ignaz Mercy d'Argenteau, a relative. He fought at the bloody Battle of Torgau on 3 November 1760 during the Seven Years' War. He was also present at the storming of Schweidnitz in October 1761. Argenteau briefly transferred to the Königsegg Infantry Regiment Nr. 16 in 1773. This was followed by a promotion to Major on 1 December 1773 and transfer to Loudon Infantry Regiment Nr. 29. In 1781, he was elevated in rank to Oberstleutnant.

Argenteau was promoted Oberst (colonel) on 1 May 1784 and assumed command of the Loudon regiment from the previous commander Vincenz von Engelhardt. He led the regiment during the Austro-Turkish War and served with distinction at the 1789 Siege of Belgrade. Argenteau received promotion to Generalmajor (GM) on 9 October 1789 to rank from 3 October 1789. His successor as commander of the Loudon regiment was Eugen Sabatha de Tombra.

== Service in Italy ==
In September 1792, the French First Republic invaded the Kingdom of Sardinia-Piedmont and rapidly overran the Duchy of Savoy and most of the County of Nice. Shocked at the ineptitude of his generals, King Victor Amadeus III asked the Austrians to provide an overall commander. On 21 December 1792, the Austrian government selected Feldzeugmeister (FZM) Joseph Nikolaus de Vins to fill the position and also sent Argenteau and GM Michelangelo Alessandro Colli-Marchi. While serving as de Vins' chief of staff, in some way Argenteau antagonized the Piedmontese officer corps, causing much discontent. De Vins determined to remotely manage the Savoy offensive of Prince Maurizio, Duke of Montferrat while remaining at the capital in Turin. On 14 August 1793, Montferrat's operation began and was initially successful because the French were preoccupied by the Siege of Lyon. However, the operation ultimately failed and by 9 October the French reoccupied the Maurienne and Tarentaise Valleys.

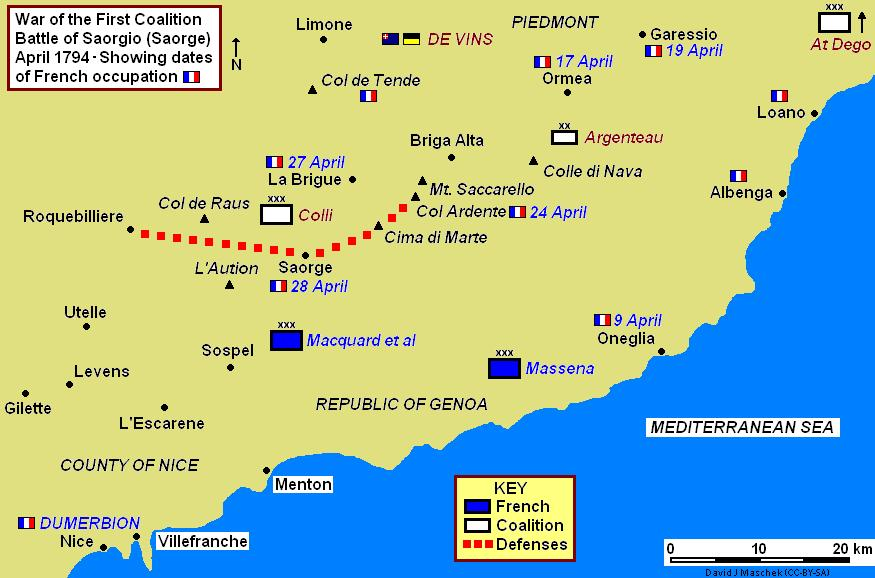
This map shows the Battle of Saorgio campaign in April 1794. The progress of the French offensive is displayed with flags and dates where known. While Dumerbion's main army probed at the Coalition lines, Masséna's wing launched a wide right hook that outflanked the enemy defenses.

On 6 April 1794, Victor Amadeus appointed Colli to command the Piedmontese forces in the County of Nice. That same day, the French launched their offensive which resulted in the Second Battle of Saorgio. Advancing according to a plan drawn up by the Army of Italy's artillery chief Napoleon Bonaparte, the French seized Oneglia on 9 April and turned north. Argenteau with 10 Piedmontese battalions tried to form a link between Colli's forces to the west and the Austrian forces which were concentrating at Cairo Montenotte to the east. However, the French columns under André Massena brushed Argenteau's forces aside and seized Ormea and Garessio by 19 April. The French turned back to the west and outflanked the defenses of Saorge which Colli abandoned on 28 April. Subsequently, the French captured the Col de Tende on the crest of the Ligurian Alps. On 30 April, Argenteau wrote a letter to Colli complaining that the Austrian commander at Cairo refused to send him any reinforcements.

On 24–26 June 1795 during the Battle of Monte Settepani, Argenteau and 4,000 troops captured Monte Settepani. This and other actions obliged the French to abandon Savona and retreat to Borghetto Santo Spirito. De Vins became ill and handed over command of the army to FZM Olivier, Count of Wallis on 22 November 1795. By coincidence, the French army led by Barthélemy Louis Joseph Schérer attacked the next day to open the Battle of Loano. Wallis' Austrians defended the left flank at Loano on the coast, Argenteau's Austrians held the center in the mountains, and Colli's Piedmontese defended the right flank in the Tanaro River valley. While pinning attacks kept Colli's troops in place, the major French effort was in the center. Rocca Barbena and Bardineto were overrun and Argenteau's troops were routed. Wallis was also driven back, and when he heard his center was broken, he retreated to Acqui, reaching there on 29 November. The Austrians suffered losses of 3,500 killed and wounded, with 4,000 men and 48 guns captured. Argenteau was blamed for the defeat. Nevertheless, Argenteau was promoted to Feldmarschall-Leutnant (FML) on 4 March 1796, to rank from 6 May 1795.

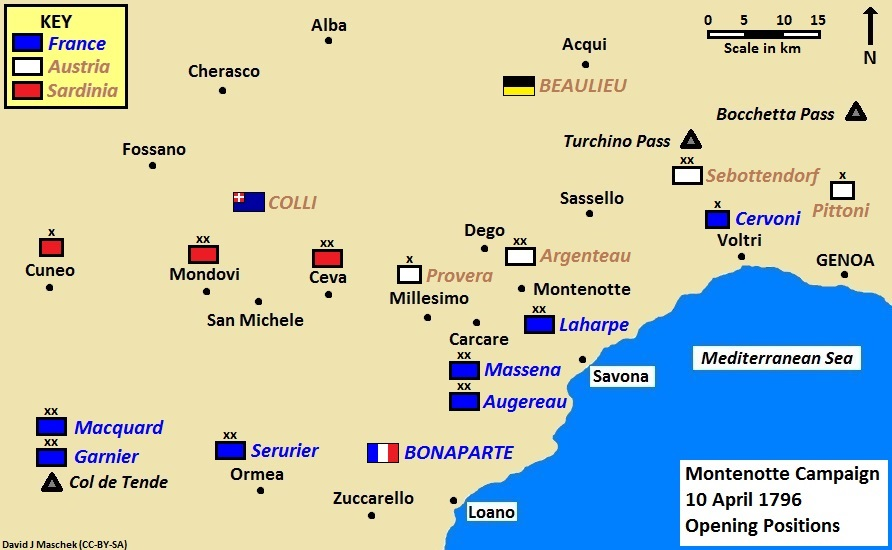
Bonaparte severed the link between the Austrian and Sardinian armies near Dego by smashing Argenteau's division.

On 1 April 1796, Argenteau commanded a division under a new army commander, FZM Johann Peter Beaulieu. According to G. J. Fiebeger, he was assigned four brigades under Oberst Karl von Salisch, and GMs Anton Lipthay, Mathias Rukavina, and Philipp Pittoni. Argenteau notified Beaulieu that he suspected the French would attack his position. Nevertheless, Beaulieu decided to attack across the Bocchetta Pass toward Genoa and began shifting his strength toward the east. On 10 April, Beaulieu attacked the French in the Battle of Voltri with 7,000 men in two columns under FML Karl Philipp Sebottendorf and Pittoni (detached). On that day, Argenteau had 9,000 infantry and 340 cavalry available; these 11 battalions and 2 squadrons were scattered between Acqui, Dego, and Sassello.

Learning that Argenteau was not prepared to attack on 10 April, Beaulieu sent a sharp message ordering him to move at once. So, on the morning of 11 April, Argenteau assembled 3,700 men in 5½ battalions and attacked the French position on Monte Negino. The Austrians were repulsed with loss, including Rukavina who was wounded. On 12 April, Napoleon Bonaparte's offensive routed Argenteau's 6,000 outnumbered soldiers in the Battle of Montenotte. The next day Argenteau reported to Beaulieu that he could rally only 700 soldiers and must retreat. In this action, the Austrians suffered 2,500 casualties. In the Second Battle of Dego on 14 April, the French crushed the remainder of Argenteau's division, inflicting 3,000 casualties (mostly captured) on a force numbering 5,700 men. Argenteau was not on the scene in the morning, but he arrived with reinforcements and was unable to retrieve the situation.

After these defeats, Beaulieu's army remained largely paralyzed at Acqui while Bonaparte forced the Kingdom of Sardinia-Piedmont to sue for peace. Despite these events, Argenteau received the Knight's Cross of the Military Order of Maria Theresa on 11 May 1796.

== Napoleonic Wars ==
In 1802, Argenteau was appointed Adlatus (Deputy) of the commanding general in Moravia and Silesia, and held this position until 1809. In addition, he was city commandant of Brno in 1804–1808. In 1804 he became Second Colonel-Proprietor of Infantry Regiment Nr. 35. In 1805, Argenteau was assigned to the army of Archduke Charles in northern Italy. At the Battle of Caldiero on 29–31 October, he led five divisions of the center of the army. Under his command were divisions led by GM Armand von Nordmann and FMLs Prince Joseph of Vaudémont, Anton Ferdinand Mittrowsky, Heinrich XV, Prince Reuss of Greiz, and Ludwig von Vogelsang. At his retirement from military service on 6 September 1808, Argenteau was appointed Feldzeugmeister, full general. From 1809 until his death, he was inhaber of the Argenteau Infantry Regiment Nr. 35. The previous inhaber was Archduke Johann Nepomuk who died at age 3 and the next inhaber was August von Herzogenberg. Argenteau died on 4 May 1819 in either Brno or Vienna.

== Notes ==
Military offices
Preceded by Vincenz Engelhardt	Oberst (Colonel) of Infantry Regiment Nr. 29; 1784–1789	Succeeded by Eugen Sabatha de Tombra
Preceded by Archduke Johann Nepomuk	Proprietor (Inhaber) of Infantry Regiment Nr. 35; 1809–1819	Succeeded by August von Herzogenberg
