= Joseph Canto d'Irles =

Austrian general

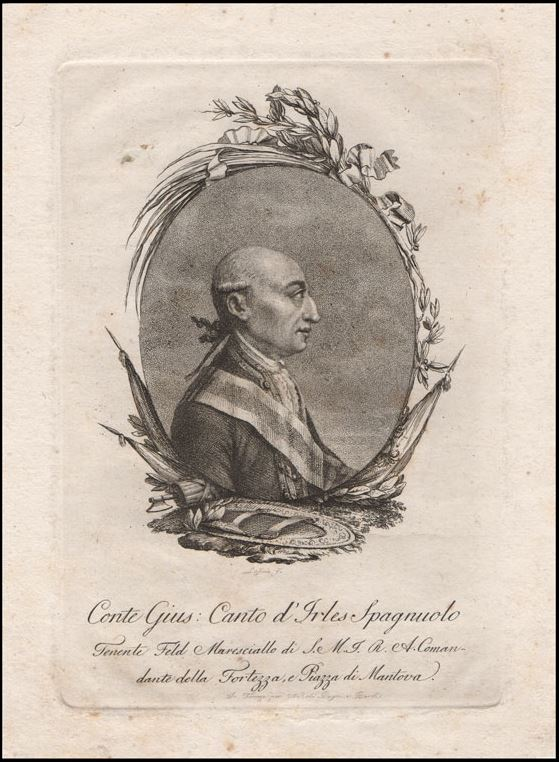
- Joseph Canto d'Irles
- Born: 29 March 1726; Vienna, Austria
- Died: 11 April 1797 (aged 71) (Note: Wurzbach gave birth and death dates as 1731 and 10 April 1797 (p. 268), while Schmidt-Brentano gave the dates listed here (p. 18).) Varaždin, Croatia
- Allegiance: Habsburg monarchy
- Branch: Infantry
- Rank: Feldmarschall-Leutnant
- Conflicts: Seven Years' War; Battle of Prague; Battle of Breslau; Battle of Teplitz; War of the Bavarian Succession; Austro-Turkish War (1788–1791); Siege of Khotin; War of the First Coalition; Siege of Mantua
- Awards: Military Order of Maria Theresa, CC

Joseph Franz Canto d'Irles or Canto d'Yrlès (29 March 1726 – 11 April 1797) was an Austrian general officer who led his troops against Napoleon Bonaparte's French army during the Siege of Mantua in 1796–1797. He joined the Austrian army as a teenager and fought in the Seven Years' War. He was promoted to Colonel (Oberst) during the War of the Bavarian Succession and to Generalmajor during the Austro-Turkish War. He was promoted to Feldmarschall-Leutnant in 1795 and assigned to command the fortress of Mantua in Italy. For successfully defending the fortress for two months, he received the Commander's Cross of the Military Order of Maria Theresa in August 1796. He was superseded in command during the later part of the siege and died two months after the fortress surrendered in February 1797.

== Early career ==
Of Valencian ancestry, Joseph Canto d'Irles was born in Vienna on 29 March 1726. He joined the Pallavacini Infantry Regiment Nr. 15 as an Ensign in 1745. He was promoted to Leutnant in 1754 and served in that rank with the infantry during the Seven Years' War. He fought at the Battle of Prague on 6 May 1757 and the Battle of Breslau on 22 November 1757. He participated in the sieges of Neisse, Strehlen, and Wittenburg. In 1758, he was promoted to captain. He fought at the Battle of Teplitz on 2 August 1762. In 1763, he married Sophie Charlotte Friederike Gräfin Zinzendorf und Pottendorf (born 1734).

== Promotion ==
Canto d'Irles received an advancement in rank to Major in 1768 and to Oberstleutnant in 1773. The latter promotion earned him the command of a grenadier battalion. During this period, each infantry regiment had two grenadier companies which were detached and formed into separate elite battalions. Canto d'Irles' battalion included the grenadier companies from Infantry Regiments Brunswick Nr. 10, Thürheim Nr. 25, and Callenberg Nr. 54 in the period 1773–1778. The battalion exchanged the grenadier companies from Nr. 25 for those from Infantry Regiment Pellegrini Nr. 49 in 1779–1780. He led the battalion in Bohemia during the War of the Bavarian Succession in 1778–1779, winning promotion to Oberst.

Canto d'Irles fought in the Austro-Turkish War of 1788–1791. He led his troops in fighting in Bukovina and at Rohatyn in April 1788. He was elevated in rank to Generalmajor for his efforts during the Siege of Khotin on 26 June 1789 to rank from 10 March 1789. He transferred to Italy in 1793 and served under Johann Georg von Wenckheim in 1794. He was promoted to Feldmarschall-Leutnant on 9 March 1795 and was appointed to command the fortress of Mantua.

== Siege of Mantua ==
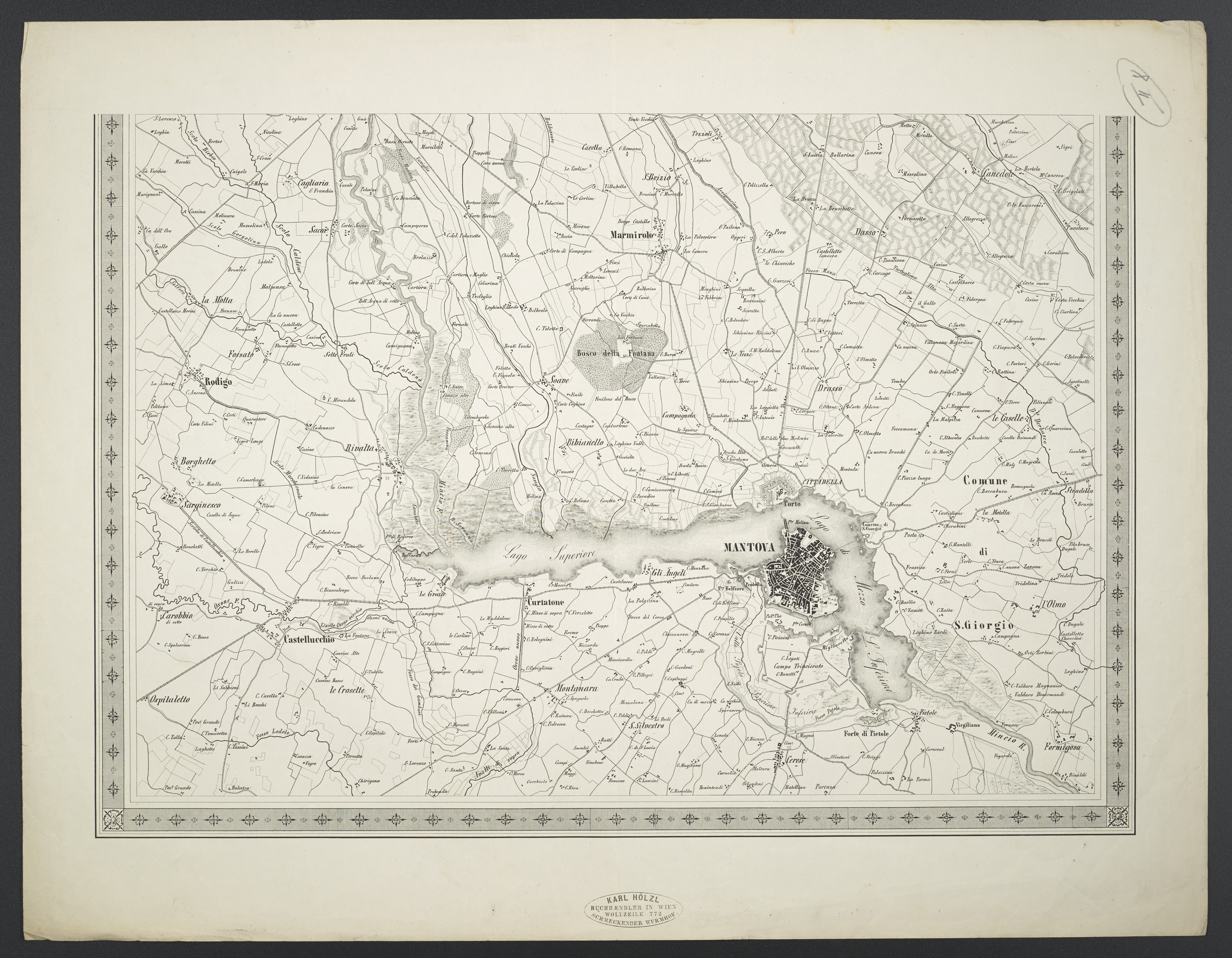
Map shows Mantova (Mantua) in 1845.

Mantua was one of the most formidable fortresses in Italy. The city was strategically important for projecting Austrian power in Italy because it was a well-placed supply center and staging point for soldiers. The critical line of communications from Austria to Italy began in Innsbruck and traced to Mantua via the Brenner Pass and the Adige River valley. However, the fortress required a garrison of 14,000 troops to properly defend it. The city was surrounded on three sides by a lake formed by the Mincio River and on the last side by marshes. On 14 May, Canto d'Irles reported that his garrison numbered only 2,154 soldiers and that there were severe shortages of food, money, and artillerymen. Nevertheless, there were ample stocks of ammunition, firearms, 76 mortars, and 179 heavy siege guns.

In mid-May, Feldzeugmeister Johann Peter Beaulieu reinforced Mantua's garrison with substantial numbers of soldiers. Canto d'Irles assigned these troops to guard an outer defense line, to repair the fortifications, and to bring in food from the surrounding area. Napoleon Bonaparte's French army defeated Beaulieu's Austrian army in the Battle of Borghetto on 30 May 1796. On 2 June, the first French soldiers appeared outside the city. By this time, there was enough bread and flour to last 71 days, oats for 124 days, hay for 22 days, and wood for 54 days. The city was notorious for epidemics of malaria which people mistakenly attributed to bad air.

By the time that the French surrounded Mantua on 3 June 1796, Canto d'Irles commanded a garrison of 13,753 soldiers. These were distributed as follows: Generalmajor Gerhard Rosselmini held the citadel with 3,666 men, Generalmajor Josef Philipp Vukassovich defended the Pradella hornwork with 2,449 soldiers, Generalmajor Mathias Rukavina von Boynograd guarded the Migliaretto with 2,443 troops, Oberst Salisch occupied the Palazzo Tè crownwork with 1,489 men, and Oberst Strurioni held the San Giorgio suburb with 2,298 men. Other defenders included 96 military engineers, 701 gunners, and 434 cavalrymen.

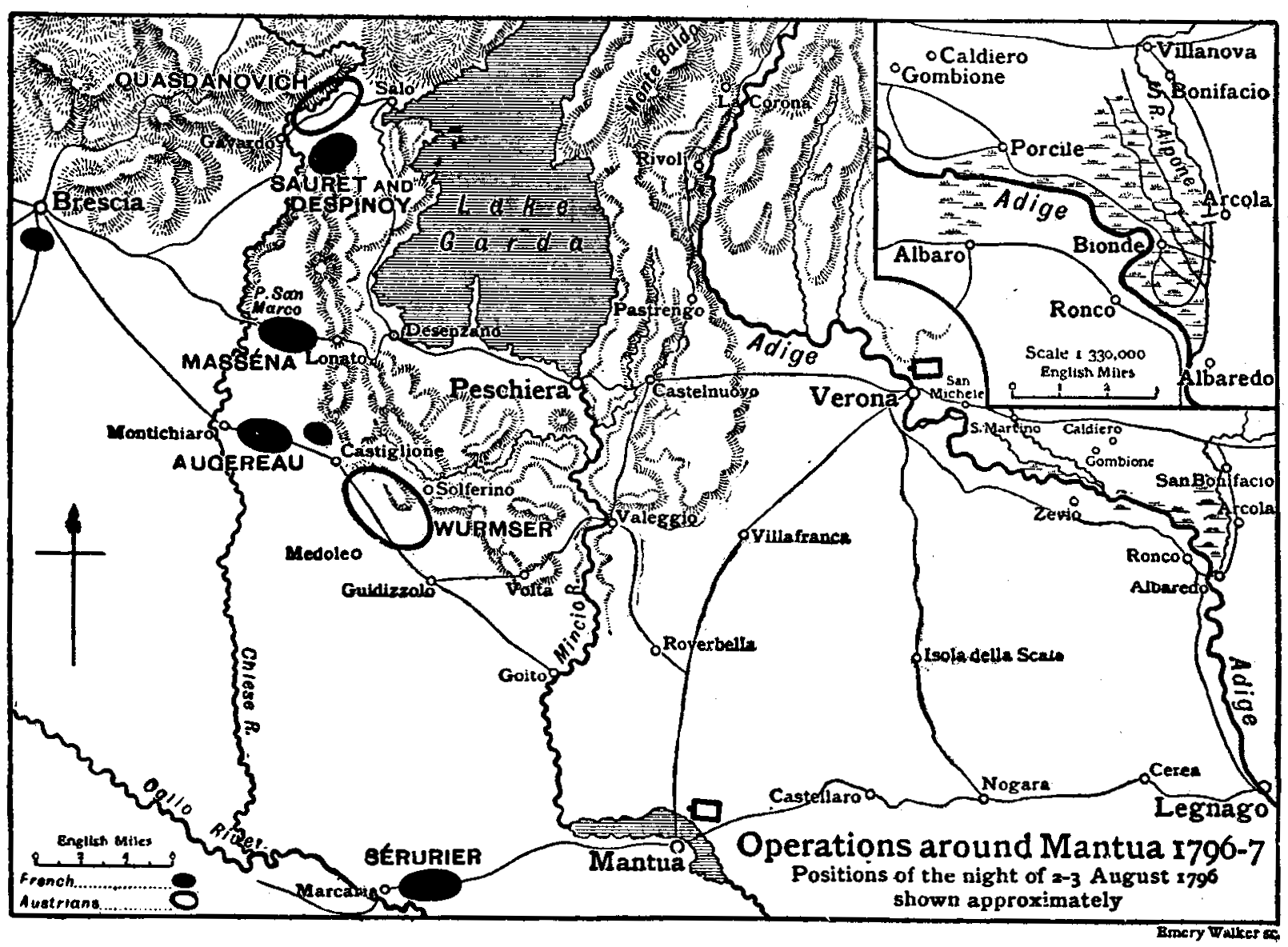
Positions of French (black) and Austrians (white) around Mantua in early August 1796.

The French did not lay siege to Mantua early in June because there was no siege artillery available and because the land around the city was flooded. So instead, Bonaparte's forces raided the Papal States and the Duchy of Modena and Reggio, extorting large sums of money and seizing siege artillery. The Mantua garrison foiled a serious French attack on 16 July 1796, though Austrian casualties were 70 killed, 330 wounded, and 64 captured. Having assembled sufficient siege guns, the French opened a bombardment of Mantua's defenses on 18 July and it continued for many days. A letter from the new Austrian army commander Field Marshal Dagobert Sigmund von Wurmser was smuggled into the city telling Canto d'Irles that he would be relieved by 2 August.

Wurmser relieved Mantua on 1 August 1796. In order to fight Wurmser's army, the French withdrew from the city, abandoning all their artillery. French losses were about 1,200 men killed and wounded, and 898 men and 174 artillery pieces captured. The Austrian garrison lost 120 killed, 395 wounded, and 74 captured in combat. Also, 372 men died of disease and 13 men deserted. From 1–10 August, the Austrians destroyed all the French siege works and removed all the captured guns into the city. However, Wurmser was defeated by Bonaparte at the Battle of Castiglione on 5 August and was compelled to withdraw from the vicinity of Mantua. At the time of its relief, 3,275 men from Mantua's garrison suffered from illness.

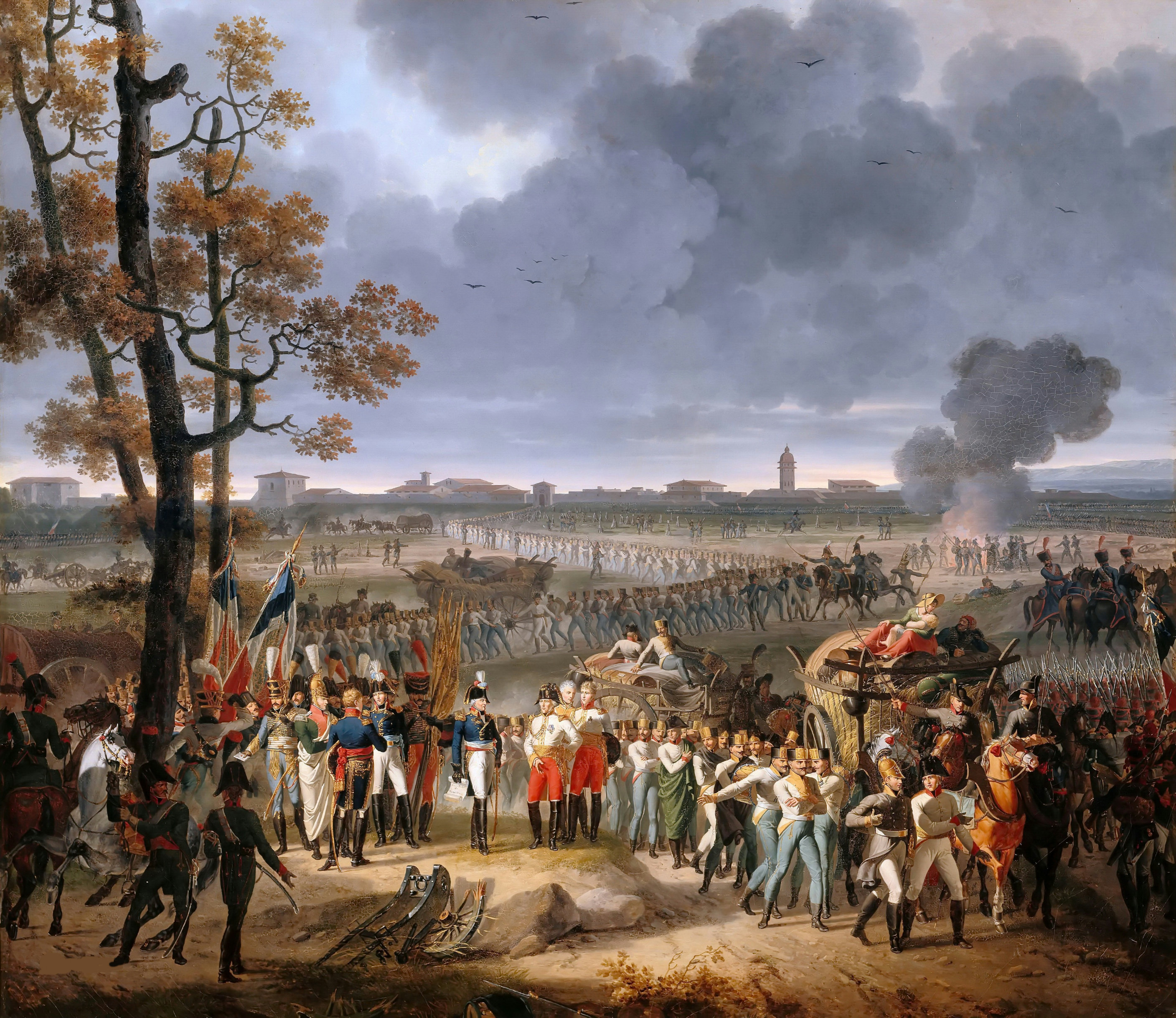
Surrender of Mantua, 2 February 1797

On 2 August, Wurmser asked Canto d'Irles for reinforcements, but only 2,000 men could be spared from the garrison. On 6 August, an inspection found that the garrison counted only 10,788 men of whom only 7,455 were fit for combat. Canto d'Irles asked for a garrison of 20,000 men if the Austrian army retreated. He was authorized to borrow money from the city's inhabitants to pay the soldiers and to buy supplies. An engineer, Feldmarschall-Leutnant Franz von Lauer arrived to help repair the fortress. The garrison was reinforced by 7 infantry battalions and 1 cavalry squadron under Generalmajors Ferdinand Minkwitz and Leberecht Spiegel. This brought the garrison to 16,423 men, but only 12,224 were fit for service. On 10 August 1796, Canto d'Irles was awarded the Commander's Cross of the Military Order of Maria Theresa.

On 8 September 1796, Bonaparte's French army routed Wurmser's army at the Battle of Bassano. Wurmser evaded all French attempts to keep him from reaching Mantua and appeared before the city with 10,367 infantry and 2,856 cavalry on 14 September. The next day, Bonaparte defeated Wurmser's forces, inflicting 2,452 casualties and forcing the survivors within Mantua. The garrison swelled to 29,676 men, but within six weeks 4,000 died from disease or battle injuries. Canto d'Irles was still technically the fortress commander, but he fell sick and was now outranked by Wurmser.

Mantua finally surrendered on 2 February 1797. Wurmser and his generals were allowed to go free with 500 infantry, 200 cavalry, and 6 guns, while 16,324 soldiers became prisoners of war until they could be exchanged. These were only survivors of 30,475 men of the garrison. Gravely ill, Canto d'Irles began to travel to Vienna, but he died on the way at Varaždin in Croatia on 11 April 1797.

== See also ==
Note that the German language Canto d'Irles page is copied from the Wurzbach reference (see below).

== Notes ==
Footnotes

Citations
