= Pierre Dominique Garnier =

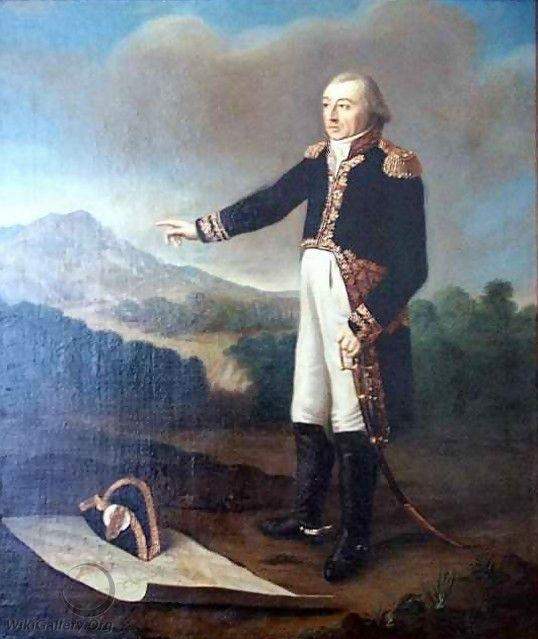
- Pierre Dominique Garnier by artist Francesco Pascucci
- Born: 19 December 1756; Marseille, France
- Died: 11 May 1827 (aged 70) Nantes, France
- Allegiance: France
- Branch: Infantry
- Rank: General of Division
- Conflicts: Assault on the Tuileries; French Revolutionary Wars; Siege of Toulon; Battle of Saorgio; Battle of Loano; Montenotte Campaign; Battle of Monte Redondo; Battle of the Var
- Awards: Légion d'Honneur, 1815

Pierre Dominique Garnier ((French pronunciation: [pjɛʁ dɔminik ɡaʁnje]; 19 December 1756 – 11 May 1827) was a French general during the French Revolutionary Wars and Napoleonic Wars. He enlisted in the French royal army in 1773 and served in the French West Indies. At the outbreak of the French Revolution he left his career as an architect and joined the National Guard. Continuing in the army, he enjoyed rapid promotion while fighting in several theaters during the War of the First Coalition. As a general of brigade he fought at Toulon and was elevated to the rank of general of division. After fighting at Loano in late 1795, he found himself under the command of Napoleon Bonaparte for the Montenotte Campaign in April 1796. Bonaparte had little use for Garnier, however. Garnier saw action in Italy during the War of the Second Coalition in 1799 and 1800. During the Napoleonic Wars he held reserve or garrison commands and retired from the military in 1816. His surname is one of the 660 names inscribed under the Arc de Triomphe.

== War of the First Coalition ==
Garnier was born in Marseille on 19 December 1756. The son of an architect, he enlisted as a foot soldier in the French royal army in 1773 and later served in the French West Indies for eight years. In 1784 he transferred to the Ile-de-France Dragoons and remained until 1788. After briefly pursuing a career as an architect, he joined the Marseille National Guards in 1789. He was involved in the Assault on the Tuileries Palace on 10 August 1792. In this incident, the National Guards attacked the Swiss Guards and, after a sharp battle, massacred most of the survivors. Garnier fought in the Alps, on the Rhine, and in Italy. He earned promotion to general of brigade on 12 September 1793. He was responsible for suppressing the counter-revolution in the County of Nice. He participated in the attack on Mont Faron during the Siege of Toulon in late 1793.

Garnier received promotion to general of division on 20 December 1793 and returned to the Army of Italy in April 1794 where he may have fought at the Battle of Saorgio. He transferred to the Army of the Alps, where he served during most of 1795. However, he was back in the Army of Italy in November 1795 when he fought at the Battle of Loano. After a brief stint in the Army of the Alps, he was back in the Army of Italy in the spring of 1796 when Napoleon Bonaparte arrived to assume command. The small divisions of Garnier and Francois Macquard defended the Col de Tende and were not in action during the Montenotte Campaign. After the French success, a messenger arrived from the north ordering Garnier and Macquard to join the rest of the army in Piedmont.

At the time, Garnier's 3,426-man 6th Division (4th Division of the Corps de Bataille) included three battalions of the 20th Line Infantry Demi-Brigade and one battalion of the 7th Provisional Line Infantry Demi-Brigade. His three brigadiers were Jean Davin, Guilin Laurent Bizanet, and Joseph Colomb. On 12 August 1796, Bonaparte wrote a letter to the French Directory, giving an assessment of his generals. His harsh opinion of Garnier, Jean-Baptiste Meynier, and Raphaël de Casabianca stated, "incapable; not fit to command a battalion in a war as active and serious as this one".

== War of the Second Coalition ==
After a period of eclipse, Garnier was employed on the frontier of the Kingdom of the Two Sicilies and was later installed as military governor of Rome. In 1799 during the War of the Second Coalition, he defeated the Sicilian army at Monte Redondo on 21 September 1799. But he was bottled up in Rome and compelled to surrender. On 29 September his 4,500-man garrison capitulated to a 4,000-strong Anglo-Neapolitan force commanded by Lieutenant General Emanuele de Bourcard. The French garrisons in Italy were cut off in large part due to British seapower. After his exchange, he led a 2,792-strong division in Louis Gabriel Suchet's corps in northwestern Italy in the spring of 1800. His division included the 33rd Line with 487 men, the 39th Line with 422 men, the 55th Line with 213 men, the 68th Line with 620 men, and the 104th Line with 1,050 men.

In a series of encounters in early April 1800, the Austrian army of Michael von Melas isolated Nicolas Soult's corps of André Masséna's army and began the Siege of Genoa on 20 April 1800. After 18 April, Melas sent Anton von Elsnitz to drive Suchet toward France. Suchet's forces were involved in actions at Monte Settepani, San Giacomo, Loano, and Montecalvo between 10 April and 7 May. The 68th Line lost its colors in the last-mentioned battle. After Bonaparte's offensive from the north, Suchet counterattacked along the Var River between 22 and 27 May. Moving across the unguarded Col de Tende, part of his corps captured 600 Austrians and seven guns at Monte Nave south of Cuneo.

== Napoleonic Wars ==
Garnier retired from the army in 1801 but was quickly called back to fill positions in the reserve during the Napoleonic Wars. He was governor of Barcelona in 1811 before retiring in July 1812. Recalled again in 1813, he was pressed into service in Italy. He was charged with evacuating Rijeka (Fiume). After the fall of Emperor Napoleon, King Louis XVIII bestowed letters of nobility on the old republican general on 31 December 1814. Made a commander of the Légion d'Honneur in 1815, he permanently retired on 1 March 1816. He died in Nantes on 11 May 1827. Garnier is inscribed on Column 25 of the Arc de Triomphe in Paris.
