= Jean-Baptiste Cervoni =

Jean-Baptiste Cervoni (Soveria, 29 August 1765 – Eckmühl, 22 April 1809) became a general officer in the French army during the French Revolutionary Wars and was killed in action in 1809 during the Napoleonic Wars.

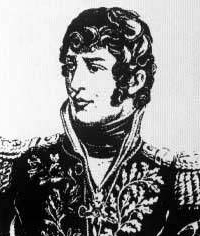
Cervoni

== Revolution ==
Born a Corsican in 1765, Cervoni enlisted in the French army as a private in the Royal Corsican Regiment in 1783. His father forced him to quit the military in 1786 to study law. In 1792 Cervoni rejoined the army as a sous-lieutenant in a cavalry unit. He served as aide to General Raphaël de Casabianca. He distinguished himself at the Siege of Toulon in 1793. During the siege he was wounded twice and promoted to chef de battalion and later chef de brigade. At this time he may have been associated with Representative of the People Antoine Christophe Saliceti, a fellow Corsican. He was also a friend of the Bonaparte family. Promoted to general of brigade on 14 January 1794, he was posted to the Army of Italy. Under the command of André Masséna, he fought at the Battle of Loano in November 1795.

In the spring of 1796, Napoleon Bonaparte took command of the army of Italy. At the beginning of the Montenotte Campaign on 10 April, Cervoni's 3,500-man brigade was attacked by 10,000 Austrians led by Johann Beaulieu at Voltri (now a suburb of Genoa). Cervoni "conducted a masterly withdrawal to the west, eluding the trap." Bonaparte quickly counterattacked, compelled the Kingdom of Sardinia-Piedmont to make peace, and forced the Austrians to retreat. During the pursuit of the Austrian army, Cervoni helped rally the troops at the Battle of Lodi. Later, he fought at the Siege of Mantua and the battles of Lonato, Castiglione, Arcola, and Rivoli.

== Empire ==
Cervoni was named general of division in February 1798. After putting down a revolt in Rome, he commanded a military division that included four departments in southwest France. On 14 June 1804, he became a commandant in the Légion d'honneur. Named chief of staff to Marshal Jean Lannes in 1809, he joined the forces massing against the Austrian Empire. On 22 April a cannonball took Cervoni's head off during the Battle of Eckmühl. CERVONI is engraved on column 17 of the Arc de Triomphe in Paris.
