= Franciscan Church, Timișoara =

Church in Timișoara, Romania

Franciscan Church
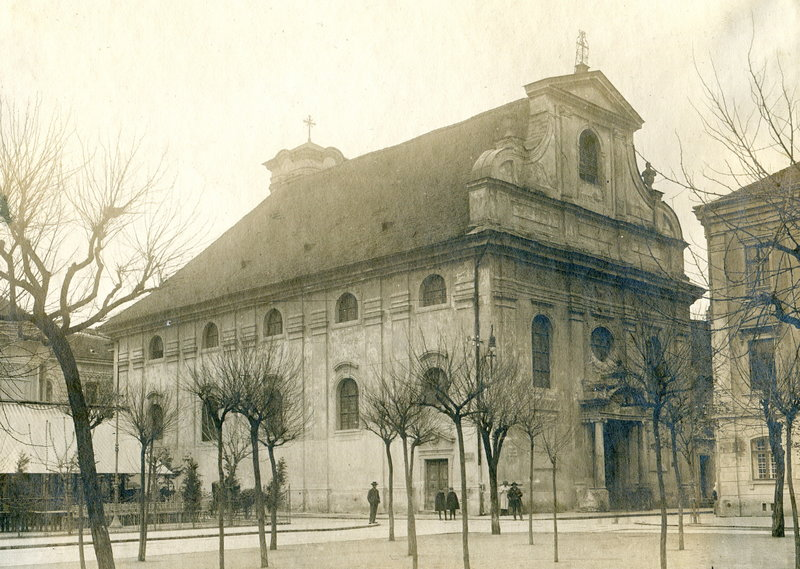

Religion
- Affiliation: Roman Catholic
- Patron: Saint John of Nepomuk
- Year consecrated: 1736
- Status: Demolished

Location
- Location: Timișoara, Romania
- Interactive map of Franciscan Church
- Coordinates: 45°45′22″N 21°13′37″E

Architecture
- Type: Church
- Style: Italian Baroque
- Founder: Order of Friars Minor Conventual
- Groundbreaking: 1733
- Completed: 1736
- Demolished: 1911

The Franciscan Church of Timișoara was a church located in the current Liberty Square in Timișoara, Romania, built between 1725 and 1736 and demolished in 1911.

== History ==
The church was constructed between 1725 and 1736, making it the first church built in the Cetate district following the Habsburg conquest of Timișoara in 1716. It was established by monks of the Franciscan Conventual Order, who came from the Franciscan Province of Bosnia. The church was situated in Parade Square—now known as Liberty Square—directly across from the old City Hall.

Initially, the Franciscans were given one of the two existing mosques in the Cetate district to use as a place of worship. This mosque had originally been a church dedicated to Saint Eligius. Until the former mosque was reconsecrated as a church—later known as St. George Church—on 7 April 1718, the Jesuits in Timișoara were temporarily accommodated here, as the mosque allocated to them was still being used as a powder magazine. A 1727 city map identifies the building as the church of the Bosnian Franciscans, situated in the southwest part of the city. In 1725, Count Mercy gave the monks permission to construct the church and simultaneously authorized them to collect alms across Banat to fund the project. On 19 March 1733, the bishop of Cenad laid the foundation stone of the church. Ten years later, the church superior asked the local administration to provide them "for the construction of a residence and church, from local fortification materials, in exchange for future compensation, 100,000 bricks and 300 barrels of lime."

On 8 December 1736, the church—built in the Italian Baroque style—was consecrated by the Bishop of Cenad, Adalbert von Falkenstein, on the feast of the Immaculate Conception. It was dedicated to Saint John of Nepomuk, the patron saint of Catholics in Banat, who at the time had a statue in Parade Square. According to a 1758 city map, the order was granted an almost square plot in the southwest part of the fortress for construction. More than half of this space was developed as a closed complex arranged around a rectangular plan with an open courtyard. The church occupied the entire southern side of the complex. However, by 1758, the complex was still not fully completed.

In 1768, Empress Maria Theresa of Austria visited the church to attend Holy Mass. A second royal visit occurred on 13 May 1770, when Emperor Joseph II, the co-ruler, came to the church during his second visit to the city and Banat. As this date also marked the birthday of Empress Maria Theresa, his mother, he participated in a solemn mass held for her prayer intentions.

A final layout of the complex was depicted in a map created by Johann Theodor Kostka in 1789, coinciding with the transfer of the monastery to the Piarist Order. Due to the reforms of Joseph II, which affected religious orders, the Franciscans were compelled to leave Timișoara on 31 July 1788. The Piarists from Sântana were relocated to Timișoara, where they took over the former Franciscan church and monastery, which had been closed to make way for the establishment of a "Latin school" that later gained regional renown. One notable alumnus of this school was the Romanian writer Ioan Slavici.

In 1809, amid the conflict between the Habsburgs and Napoleonic France, the crown and imperial regalia of the Holy Roman Empire were concealed in the church's crypt. The city militia, established only a year earlier in 1808, guarded the wooden boxes holding the Austrian treasures, unaware of the valuable items hidden within. The church also hosted the city's second episcopal consecration on 10 May 1801, for Ladislaus Kőszeghy von Remete, as well as the third in 1829, for Antonius Török—both bishops of Cenad who resided in Timișoara.

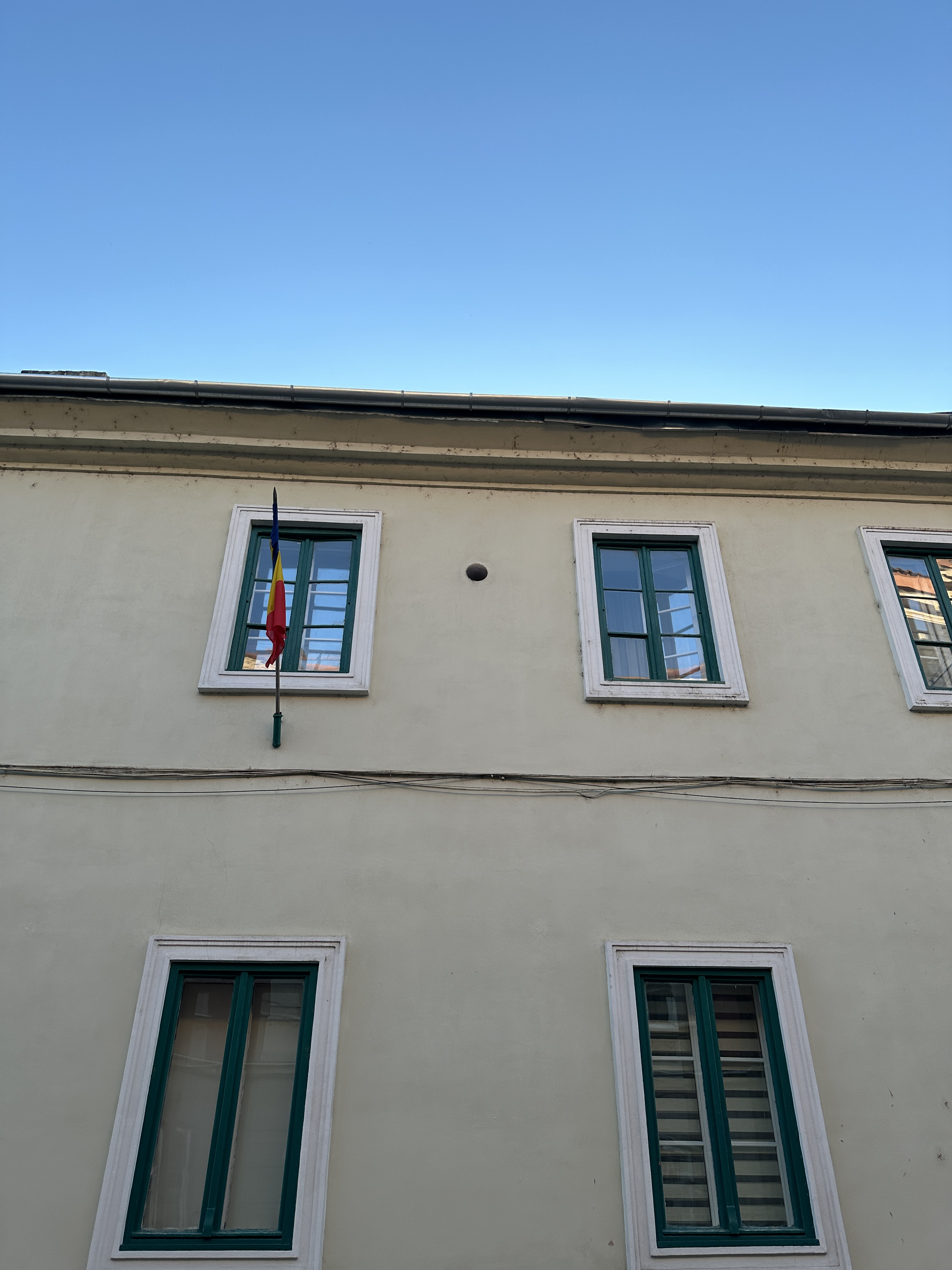
The shell from the siege of Timișoara, visible on the façade of the building

Since the siege of Timișoara during the Hungarian Revolution of 1848–1849, a shell has remained embedded in the monastery wall and is still visible today. In 1909, the monastery was transferred to the local administration, which established the Music Conservatory there. This institution later evolved into the Popular School of Arts and is now known as the Timiș County Center for Art and Culture.

=== Demolition ===
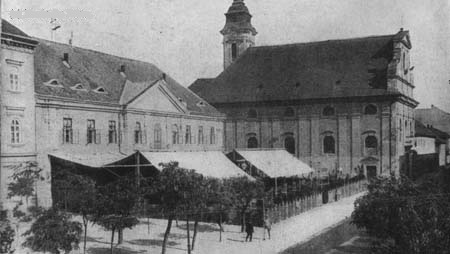
The church in 1911

Due to the poor condition of the old 18th-century church, the Piarist Order decided to construct a new building. The old Franciscan church was taken over by the city administration and demolished in 1911, after the remains of over 261 notable individuals—including members of the orders, high-ranking military personnel, and Austrian soldiers—were exhumed from the crypt and reburied in the Military Cemetery, now located on Calea Lipovei. Among those reburied was Johanna von Honrath, Ludwig van Beethoven's first love. The new church was rebuilt opposite Scudier Park, where the Church and Piarist Complex stand today, while the Credit Bank Palace was constructed on the former church site.

The church's demolition was justified by the plan to widen the fortress's east–west axis. Local authorities, following a city expansion design by architects Emil Szilárd and Josef Briger, aimed to create a broad boulevard stretching from Mehala to Fabric. This was driven by growing traffic demands as well as the city's modernization efforts, which ultimately led to the defortification of the area.

In a 1956 article, architect Gheorghe Bleyer blamed the priests' greed as the primary reason for the disappearance of both the Franciscan Church and St. George Church, claiming they were corrupted by banks into selling the properties.

== Architecture ==
The church was constructed in the Italian Baroque style. Above the main altar, also Baroque in design, hung a large painting depicting Saint John of Nepomuk surrounded by angels, with the city of Timișoara at his feet, mirroring the representation found in 18th-century engravings. This painting has sparked much debate, with most experts believing it was originally intended for the Timișoara Cathedral and attributed to Michelangelo Unterberger, director of the Vienna Academy of Fine Arts. Among his works, Unterberger painted a Saint George for the cathedral's main altar in 1754. It remains unclear whether Unterberger created only a sketch rather than a full painting of Saint John of Nepomuk, especially since existing photographs reveal a striking resemblance between the Viennese artist's sketch and the painting on the church's main altar.

The main altar also featured a Baroque tabernacle, flanked by two smaller paintings depicting the Virgin Mary and the Archangel Gabriel, together forming the scene of the Annunciation. These paintings are now housed in the Timișoara Diocesan Museum. Above the tabernacle was a copy of the miraculous image of Mary from Radna, created at the end of 1750, which, alongside the image, also portrayed Canon Johannes Szlezak, who led the effort to recognize Radna as a pilgrimage site that same year. Unfortunately, both the large painting of Saint John of Nepomuk and the small copy of the miraculous image of the Virgin Mary from Radna have since vanished without a trace.
