= Timișoara City Hall =

Coordinates: 45°45′4″N 21°13′35″E

Timișoara City Hall Primăria Municipiului Timișoara
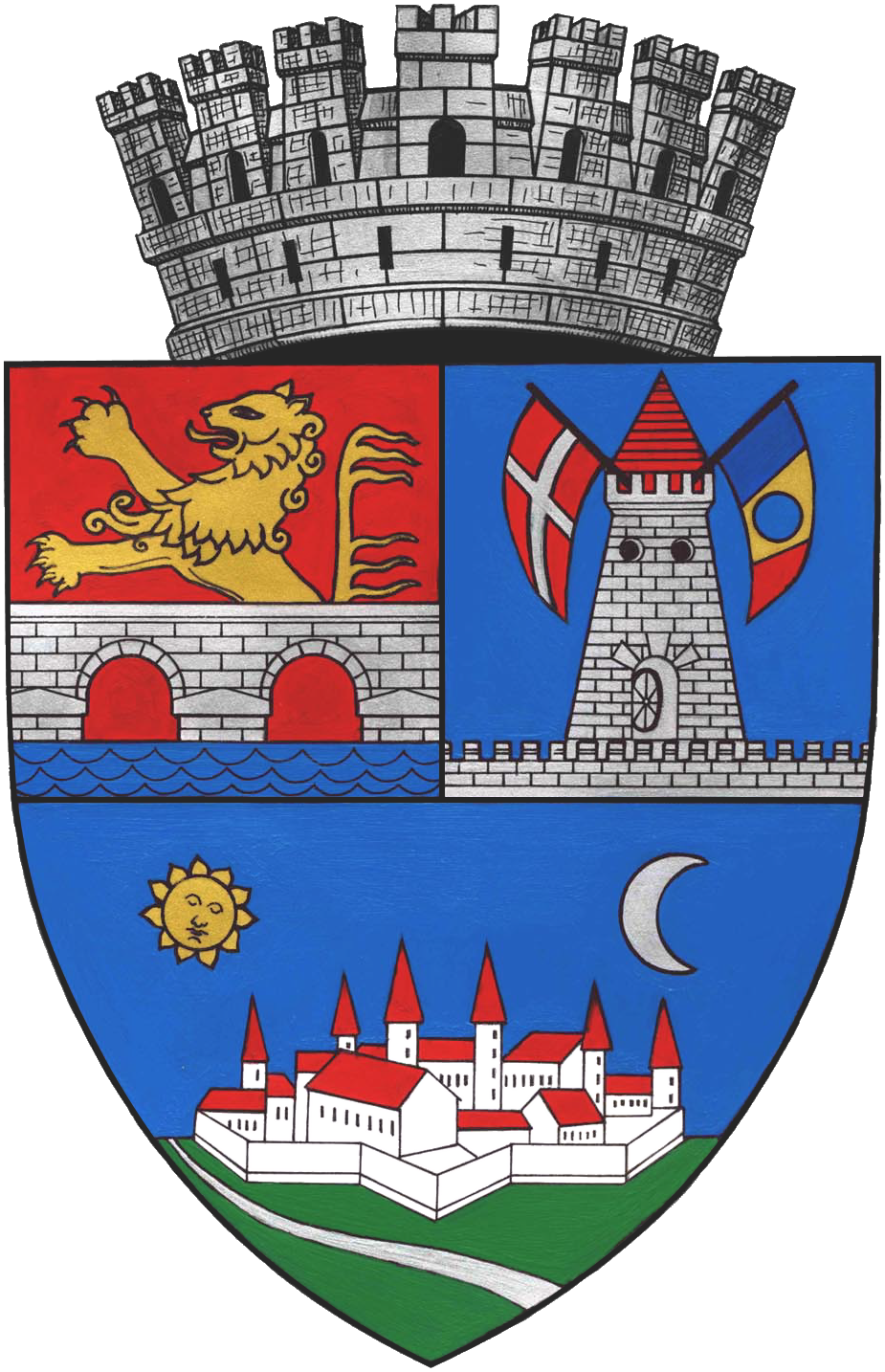
- Coat of arms of Timișoara

Type
- Type: Local public administration authority of Timișoara

History
- Founded: January 1, 1718

Leadership
- Mayor: Dominic Fritz
- Vice mayors: Ruben Lațcău; Paula Romocean
- Public administrator: Matei Creiveanu
- Secretary: Adina Pokker

Meeting place
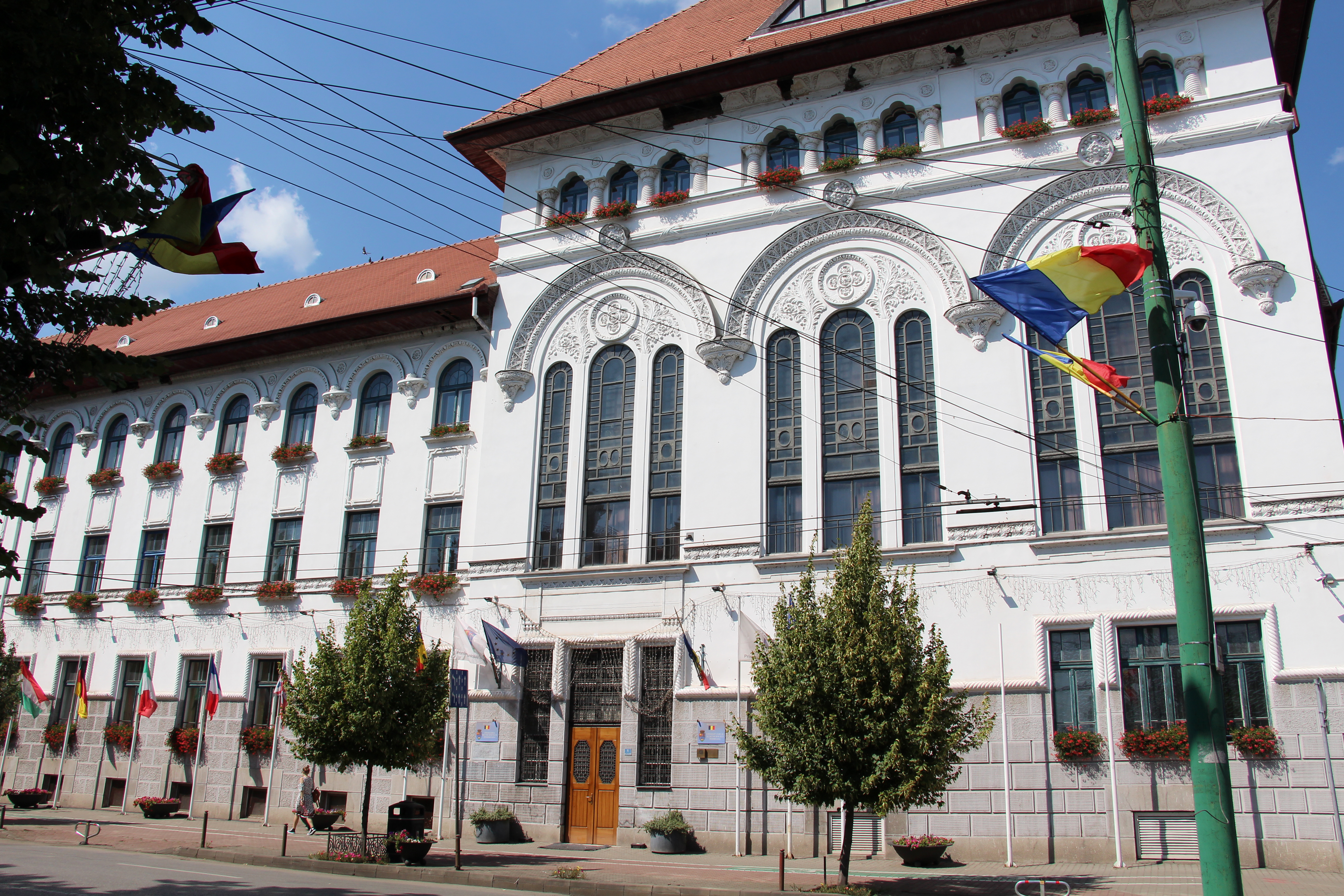
- New City Hall

Website
- www.primariatm.ro

The Timișoara City Hall (Romanian: Primăria Municipiului Timișoara) is the administrative body with permanent operational activity responsible for implementing the decisions of the local council and the directives of the mayor, addressing the ongoing administrative and community matters of the municipality. The institution is headed by the city's mayor, Dominic Fritz.

Since 1949, the city hall has operated in the former premises of the Higher School of Commerce, a building declared a historical monument with the LMI code TM-II-m-B-06144.

== History ==
After the Habsburg troops captured the Timișoara Fortress in 1716, the city's civil administration was, for a time, managed by two magistrates (mayors), each representing one of the main communities: the German magistrate oversaw the German population, while the Rascian magistrate represented the Serbian community. Separate headquarters were constructed for each administration.

The headquarters of the German magistrate was located at 1 Liberty Square. Construction of the town hall for the German community commenced in 1731 and was completed in 1734, at which time the building became operational. The office of the Rascian magistrate was situated at 2 Gheorghe Lazăr Street, the present site of the Nikolaus Lenau High School. The land on which it stood was parceled in 1759, and construction of the Rascian community's town hall commenced in 1760. The building was completed and became operational in 1761.

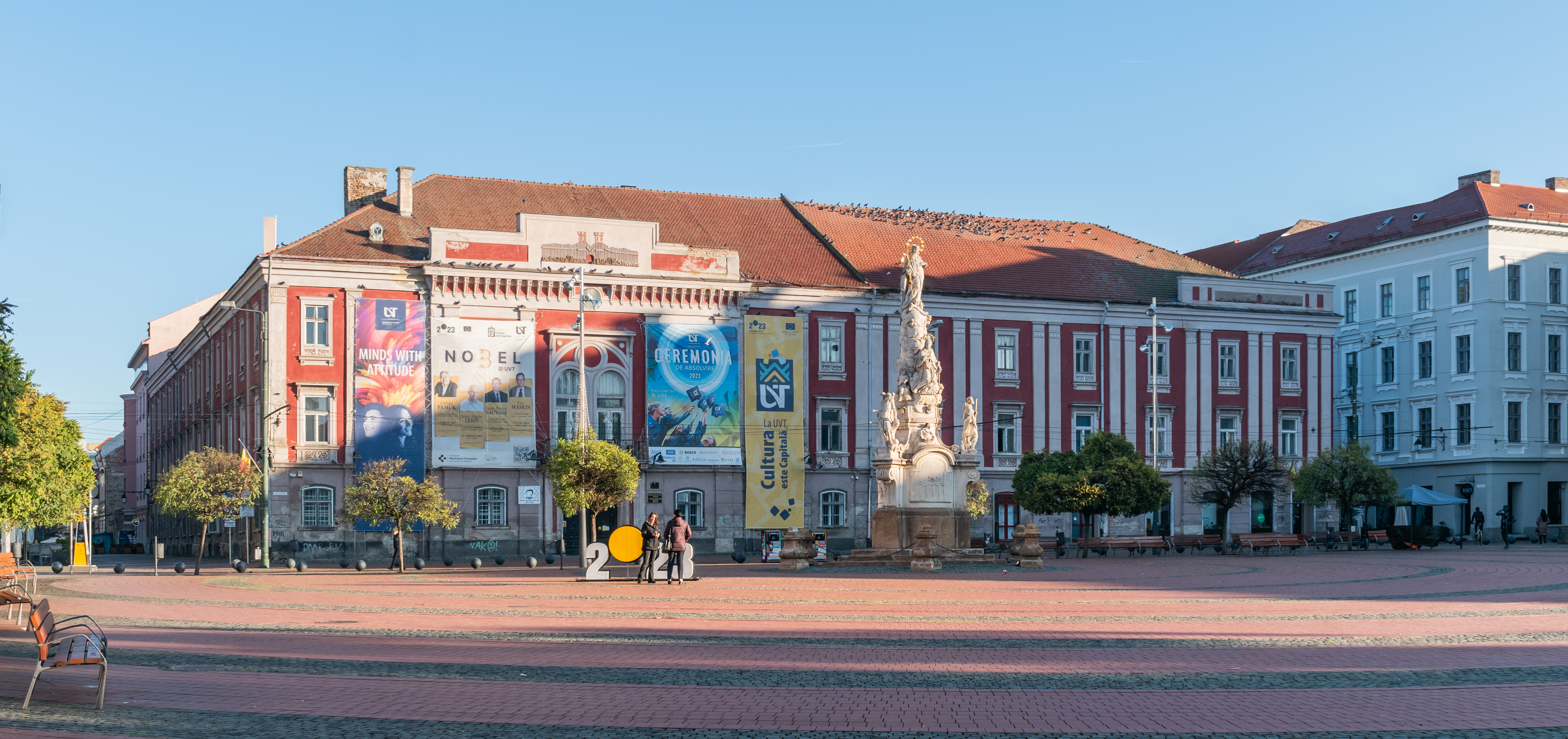
The Old Town Hall in Liberty Square

In 1880, the two town halls were consolidated under the administration of Magistrate Pietro A. del Bondio. The municipal offices continued to function in the building located in Liberty Square until 1949. Today, this building is referred to as the Old Town Hall and has been designated a historical monument, registered under the LMI code TM-II-m-A-06142.

In 1949, the city hall was moved to the premises of the former Higher School of Commerce.

== Headquarters ==
The City Hall is situated at 1 Constantin Diaconovici Loga Boulevard. The building was designed in 1914 by architect László Székely and was originally intended to house the Higher School of Commerce (Hungarian: Felső Kereskedelmi Iskola).

At the time, boys and girls attended separate classes; consequently, the building was designed with two entrances located on the same, southern façade. The ground and first floors accommodated separate classrooms for each group, as well as the principal's office, teachers' rooms, and laboratories. The second floor contained classrooms intended for alternate use by both girls and boys. A gymnasium was also planned for shared use. Initially, only two façades were to be constructed, allowing for the subsequent expansion of the building as required. The school included a ceremonial hall with a capacity of 350 seats—now serving as the city hall's council chamber—which lost most of its original decorative elements following a modernization process.

Construction commenced on May 14, 1914, under the contract of Artur Tunner; however, work was halted at the ground-floor level following the outbreak of the First World War. Activities resumed in 1924 under the supervision of contractors Ștefan Pautz and Alexandru Ioțcu, and the structure reached roof level by 1925. The façade decoration was subsequently redesigned in an eclectic Neo-Romanian style by architect Adrian Suciu, with the exterior finishes completed in 1929.

== See also ==
- List of mayors of Timișoara
