= Jerko Rukavina =

Croatian politician and soldier

Baron Jerko Rukavina of Vidovgrad
- Jerko Rukavina Vidovgradski
- Born: 1796; Trnovac near Gospić, Kingdom of Croatia, Austrian Empire
- Died: 17 February 1879 (aged 82–83); Zagreb, Croatia-Slavonia, Austria-Hungary
- Burial place: Mirogoj Cemetery
- Relatives: Mathias Rukavina von Boynograd; Juraj Rukavina Vidovgradski (uncle)
- Military career
- Allegiance: Austrian Empire
- Service years: 1813–1853
- Rank: Major General
- Commands: 2nd Ban of Croatia Regiment
- Conflicts: First Italian War of Independence

Baron Jerko (Jeronim) Rukavina Vidovgradski (1796 – 17 February 1879) was a Croatian soldier.

== Biography ==
The region of Lika where he was born passed from the Austrian Empire to the French Illyrian Provinces when he was a teenager. He attended the Prytanée national militaire French military school in La Flèche. As a cadet, Rukavina joined a French regiment.

Following the War of the Sixth Coalition, from 1813 until 1818, Rukavina served in the Otočac and Slunj regiments of the Croatian Military Frontier. In 1819, following promotion to the rank of a warrant officer, Rukavina was transferred to the 2nd Ban of Croatia Regiment based in Petrinja. In 1827, he was promoted to the rank of Oberleutnant. He became a captain in 1840 and a major six years later. He took part in battles of the First Italian War of Independence, deployed to the area of Mantua with three companies of the 2nd Ban of Croatia Regiment in 1848. That year he was promoted first to the rank of lieutenant colonel and colonel. In 1849, he was appointed the commanding officer of the 2nd Ban of Croatia Regiment and promoted to the rank of major general. He held the rank and position until his retirement in 1853. In the period when he commanded the regiment, Rukavina was the president of Petrinja Shooting Society and a member of the city's Institute of Music.

Rukavina never married. He donated an altar and bells to the parish church in his native village of Trnovac near Gospić and established a fund for education of Rukavina family children. His year of death is variously reported. Some sources indicate it as 1880, while others specify 1879. Rukavina is buried at the Mirogoj Cemetery in Zagreb.
