= Cloister of the Franciscan Monastery of Timișoara =

Historic building in Timișoara, Romania

Coordinates: 45°45′23″N 21°13′37″E

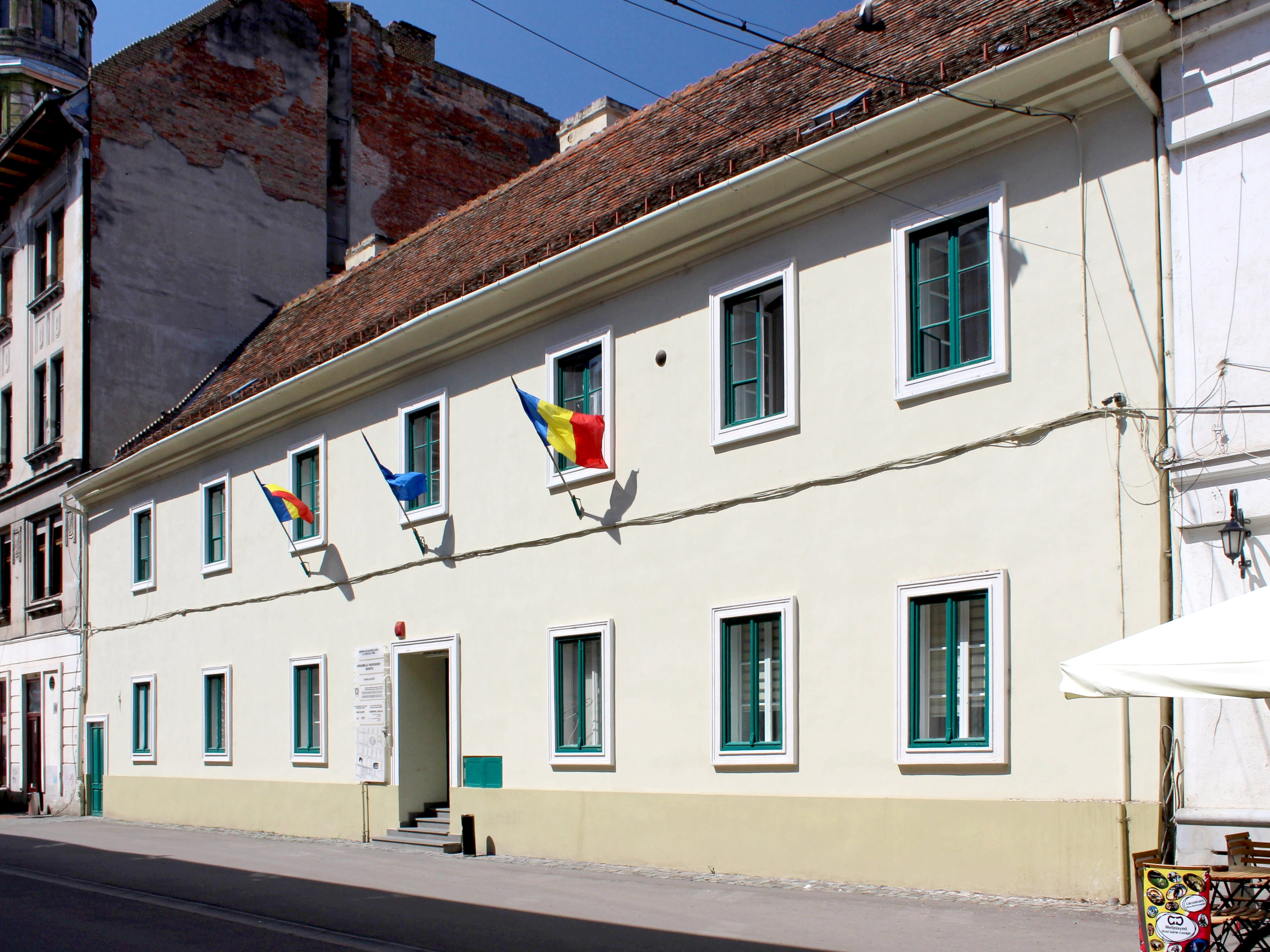
Cloister of the Franciscan Monastery

The cloister of the Franciscan Monastery is a historical building in Timișoara, Romania. One of the oldest buildings in the historic Cetate district, today it hosts the Popular School of Art, the Timiș County Culture and Art Center, and the Banatul Professional Ensemble.

== History ==
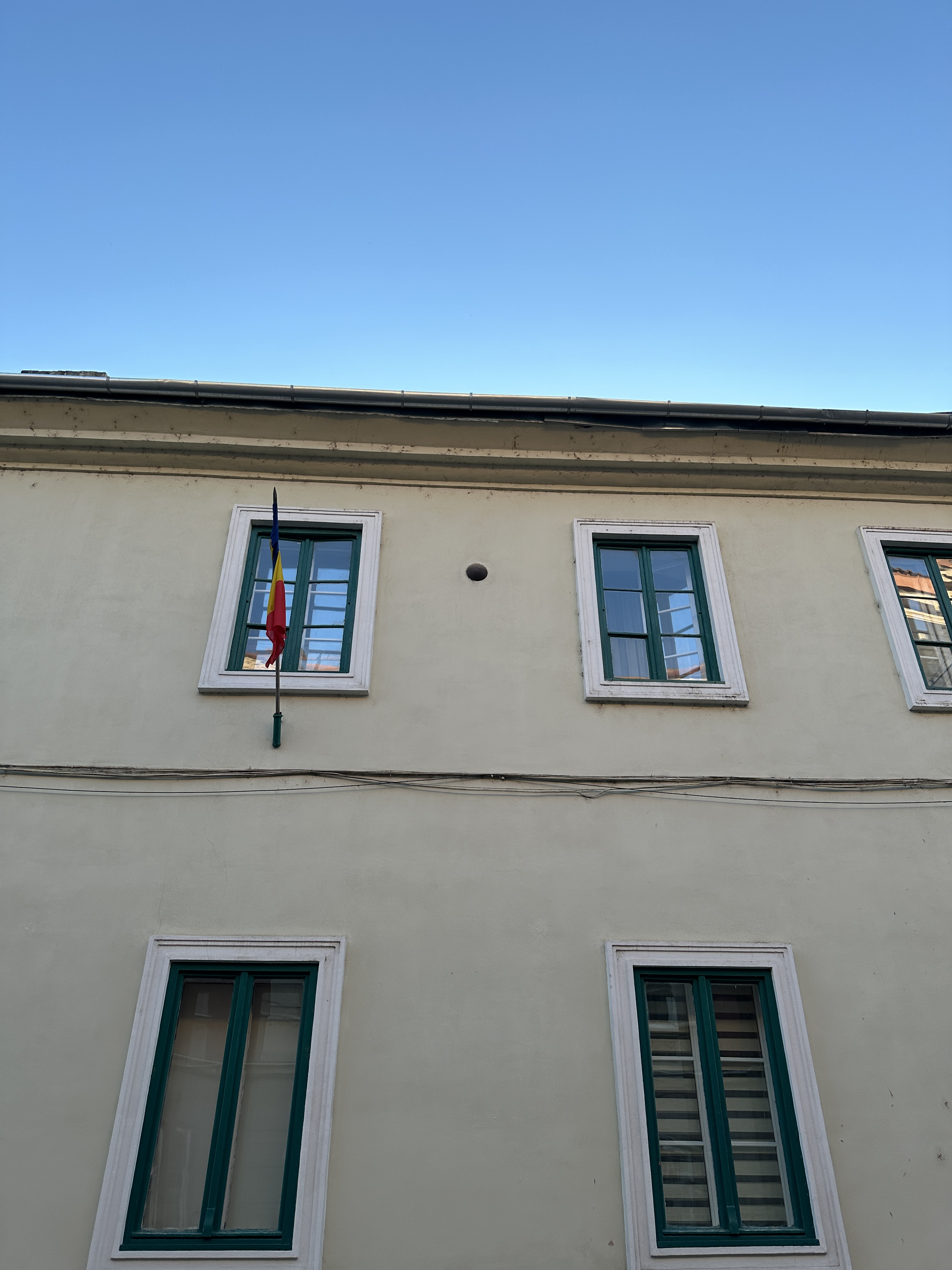
The shell from the siege of Timișoara, visible on the building's facade

The former Franciscan Monastery is one of the oldest buildings in the city. Built between 1716 and 1736, it was part of an architectural complex that included a church and a monastery. In 1768, Empress Maria Theresa attended the Holy Mass here.

The cloister of the Franciscan Monastery, constructed in 1740, is designed as a U-shaped enclosure, with the southern facade of the church forming part of the boundary of the courtyard. Originally serving a religious purpose, the building was handed over to the Piarist Order in 1789, who set up a school within the monastery. In 1909, the building was transferred to local authorities, who established the Music Conservatory in the space. This educational institution functioned at different levels until 1962, when it became the Popular School of Art (Romanian: Școala Populară de Arte), offering a wide range of programs for all ages, including theater, classical and folk singing, fine arts, and ballet.

The writer Ioan Slavici studied here from 1865 to 1867. The church within the complex operated until 1911, when it was torn down, and the Credit Bank building was constructed in its place between 1911 and 1912, based on a design by architect László Székely.

Signs of its historical past remain visible, including a shell embedded in the wall of the former monastery, a remnant from the 1849 siege of Timișoara.
