= Juraj Rukavina Vidovgradski (soldier) =

Croatian politician and soldier

Baron Juraj Rukavina of Vidovgrad
- Juraj Rukavina Vidovgradski
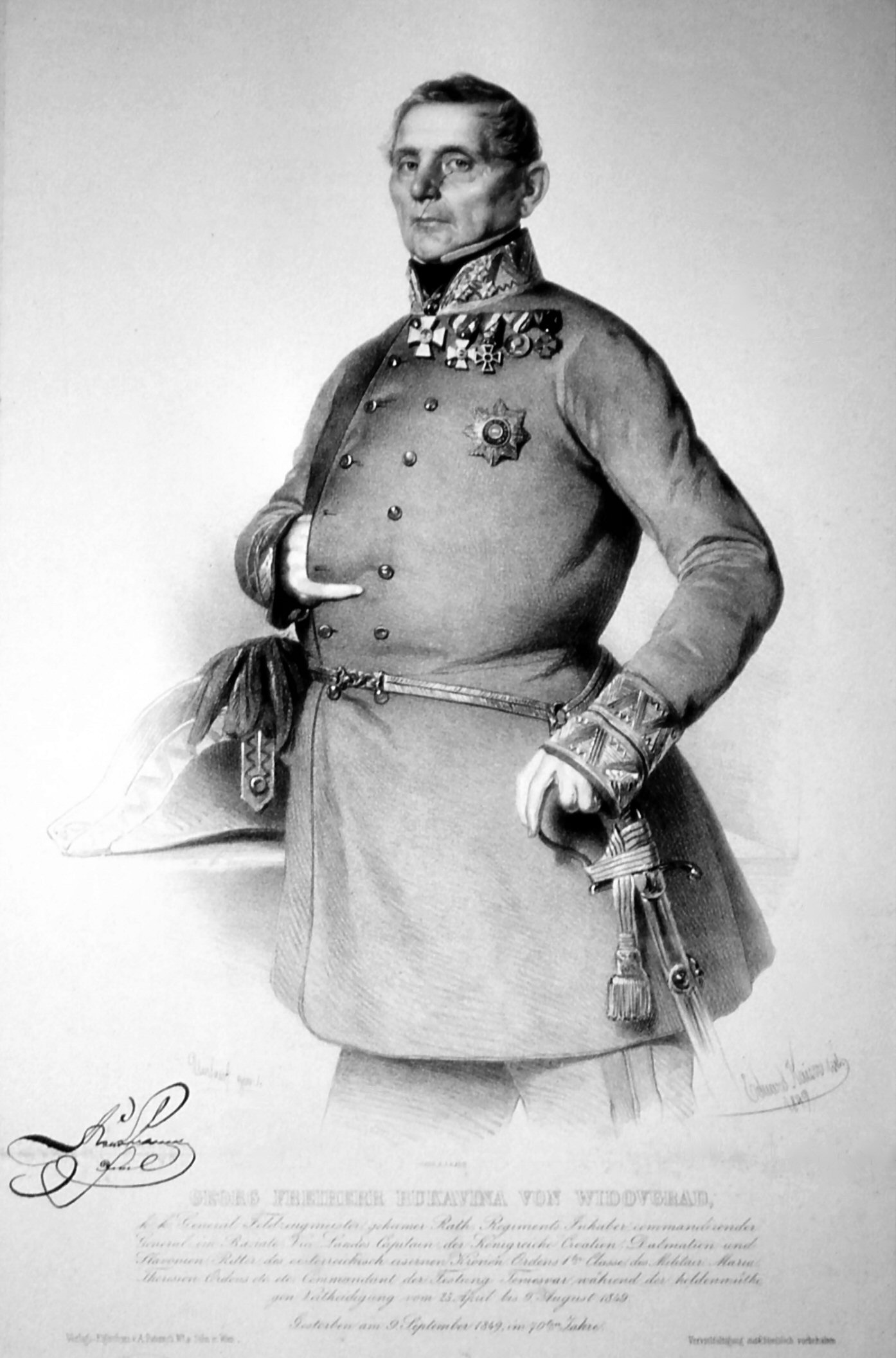
- Portrait of Juraj Rukavina
- Born: 21 March 1777; Trnovac near Gospić, Kingdom of Croatia
- Died: 9 September 1849 (aged 72); Timișoara, Hungary
- Burial place: St. George Cathedral
- Other name: Georg Freiherr Rukavina von Vidovgrad
- Spouse: Cecilia Volgenut Greiftal (m. 1810–1849)
- Children: Marija, Alfred
- Relatives: Mathias Rukavina von Boynograd
- Military career
- Allegiance: Austrian Empire
- Service years: 1793–1849
- Rank: General of the Artillery
- Units: Ogulin Regiment; Otočac Regiment
- Commands: Ogulin Regiment; Ban of Croatia Brigade (Petrinja); Petrovaradin Division; Timișoara Fortress
- Conflicts: Battle of Landshut; Battle of Aspern-Essling; Siege of Temesvár
- Awards: Order of Leopold; Military Order of Maria Theresa; Order of the Iron Crown; Order of Saint George
- Other work: Member of the Sabor of the Kingdom of Croatia

Baron Juraj Rukavina Vidovgradski (21 March 1777 – 9 September 1849) was a Croatian soldier and politician. Rukavina fought in the Napoleonic Wars and against the Ottoman Empire, rising to the rank of the General of the Artillery. He held several commands, including that of the Ban of Croatia Brigade based in Petrinja, a divisional command in Petrovaradin and the command of the Timișoara Fortress. The Ban of Croatia also appointed Rukavina the vice-captain of the Kingdom of Croatia. Rukavina was a member of the Sabor of the Kingdom of Croatia where he held his inaugural speech in the Croatian language in 1832, long before it became the official language of the Sabor.

== Biography ==
=== Start of military career ===
Juraj Rukavina was born in the village of Trnovac near Gospić in the Kingdom of Croatia, then a part of the Habsburg Monarchy. His father Dujam (Duje) was awarded hereditary status of Austrian nobility in 1800 and the title "Vidovgradski" (lit. of Vidovgrad) for his military service. Other family members were active in the military as well and a total of three Austrian army generals and 58 other officers came from that family. (Note: In addition to Juraj Rukavina himself, those were Mathias Rukavina von Boynograd (1737–1817) and Jerko Rukavina (1796–1879). In addition, Ivan Rukavina of Klanačko Polje (1853–1917) and Stjepan Rukavina (1857–1936) were generals in the Austro-Hungarian army, and Ivan Rukavina (1912–1992) was a Partisan and Yugoslav People's Army general.) Rukavina attended military school in Gospić and joined the Ogulin Regiment of the Croatian Military Frontier in 1793. With the regiment, Rukavina took part in the War of the First Coalition. Rukavina Vidovgradski led the Austrian troops to capture Zadar on 5 July 1797. The capture was confirmed later that year through the Treaty of Campo Formio. He also took part in the 1809 Battle of Landshut and the Battle of Aspern-Essling by which time he was promoted to the rank of Major.

=== Commands held ===
In 1814–1819, Rukavina held the rank of Lieutenant Colonel in the Otočac Regiment, before assuming command of the Ogulin Regiment. In 1829, he was promoted to the rank of Major General and given command of the brigade of the Ban of Croatia based in Petrinja and he held that post until 1833. During that time, the Ban of Croatia also appointed Rukavina the vice-captain of the Kingdom of Croatia. For his conduct in the 1835 Battle of Velika Kladuša against the Ottoman Empire, Rukavina was awarded the Order of Leopold by emperor Ferdinand I of Austria. The battle was the culmination of a punitive expedition against Ottoman raiders harassing the border area. The raids went unanswered due to a prohibition of retaliatory actions imposed by Francis I of Austria in an effort to avoid a wider conflict with the Ottoman Empire. Shortly after the emperor's death, Rukavina ordered the retaliatory raid at his own initiative. The attacking force largely consisted of elements of the Ogulin regiment commanded by Colonel Johann Schnekel von Trebersburg, supported by elements of the Slunj-based regiment. Tržac fortress was attacked on 10 June. The clash in Tržac resulted in five killed and ten wounded attackers, while 80 defenders died and 160 were injured. The Velika Kladuša Castle was sacked on 17 June. The attacking force of the Ogulin regiment was personally led by the future Ban of Croatia, then Captain Josip Jelačić. Rukavina was honored by being named inhaber (proprietor) of Infantry Regiment Nr. 61 in 1836, after the previous inhaber Franz Xaver Saint-Julien died. He held the position until his death when he was succeeded by Julius Strassoldo-Grafenberg.

In 1836–1840, Rukavina was the divisional commander in Petrovaradin, holding the rank of lieutenant field marshal. In 1840, Rukavina was awarded the title of baron. In the same year he received the command of the Timișoara Fortress and the Military Order of Maria Theresa. Emperor Franz Joseph I of Austria granted Rukavina the Order of the Iron Crown and the Order of Saint George and the rank of the General of the Artillery.

=== Family life and parliamentary service ===
Rukavina married Cecilia Volgenut Greiftal in Timișoara in 1810 and had daughter Marija and son Alfred. He was a member of the Sabor of Croatia where he held his inaugural speech in the Croatian language in 1832, well before start of the Croatian national revival, contributing to affirmation of the national language. Rukavina was killed defending the Timișoara Fortress during the Hungarian Revolution and was buried in the St. George Cathedral in the city.

== Notes ==
Military offices
Preceded by Franz Xaver Saint-Julien	Proprietor (Inhaber) of Infantry Regiment Nr. 61; 1836–1849	Succeeded by Julius Strassoldo-Grafenberg
