= St. Mary and St. John of Nepomuk Monument =

Heritage site in Timiș County, Romania

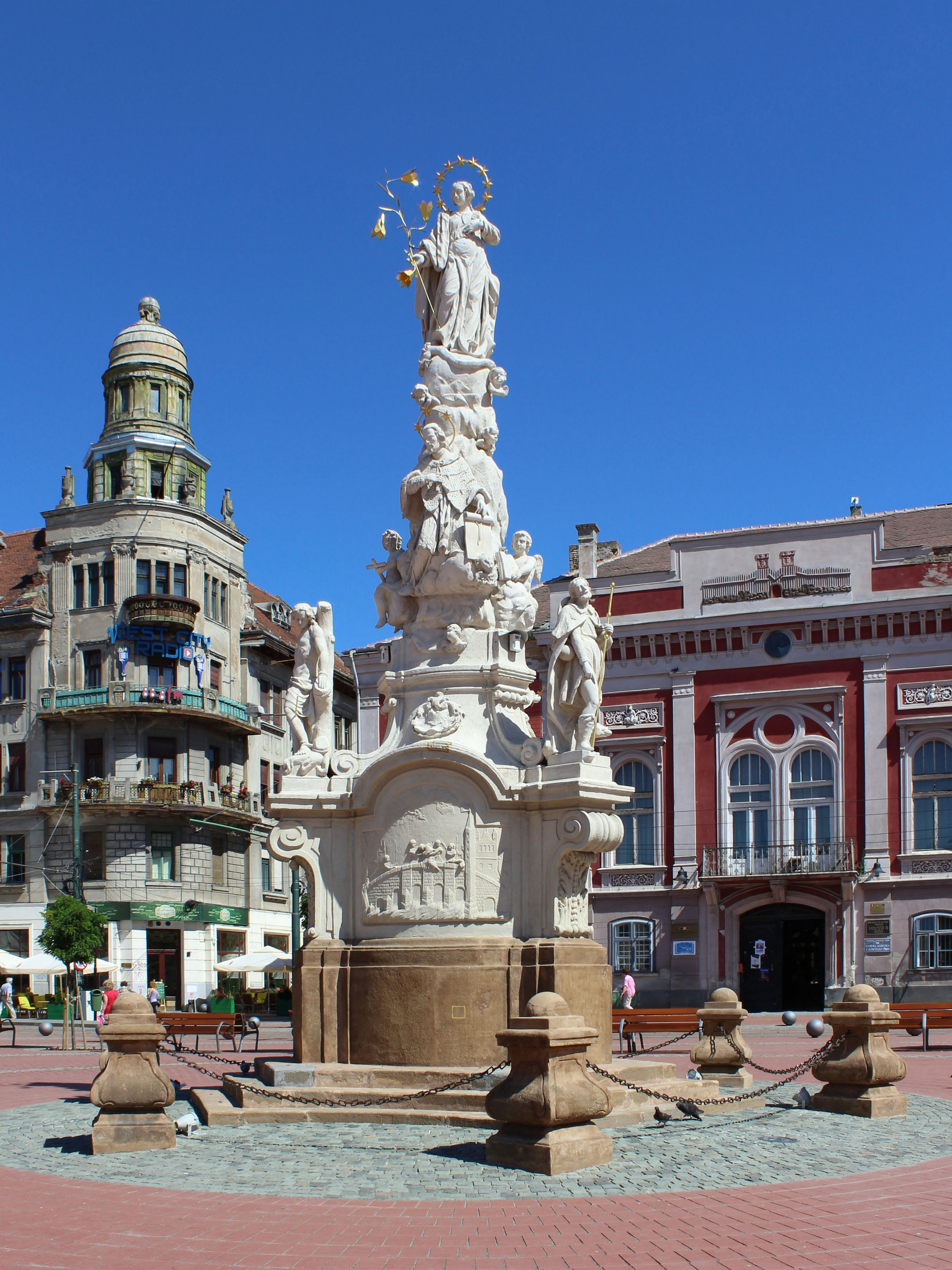
- 45°45′20″N 21°13′37″E
- Location: Liberty Square, Timișoara, Romania
- Designer: F. Blim, E. Wasserburger
- Material: Leitha limestone, sandstone
- Completion date: 1756
- LMI code: TM-III-m-A-06306

The St. Mary and St. John of Nepomuk Monument, often shortened as Statue of St. John of Nepomuk, is a Romanian Baroque monument in Timișoara's Liberty Square. It is one of the two plague columns built in Timișoara after the Great Plague of 1738; the other is located in the neighboring Union Square. It is inscribed in the list of historical monuments with the code TM-III-m-A-06306.

== History ==
The plague epidemic of 1738–1739 cost the lives of about 1,000 of the 6,000 inhabitants of Timișoara. As early as 1739, the city administration, represented by mayor Peter Solderer, took a solemn oath to perform various good deeds, as a sign of gratitude for ending the epidemic. The "Nepomuk brothers", a religious association in the city, also wanted to commission a work of art to commemorate the epidemic. It seems that the "Nepomuk brothers" issued the execution order of the monument. The chosen artist was Georg Raphael Donner, but he could not execute the work himself. The sculptors were F. Blim and E. Wasserburger, who took three years to complete the monument (1753–1756). The current statue has replaced the older, more modest statue of St. Nepomuk, the patron saint of Catholics in Banat. As this first statue was carved in low-strength sandstone, it was replaced with the current monument. And old Nepomuk was moved over time to various parts of the city, eventually reaching the courtyard of the Catholic parish church in the Fabric district.

In 1852 it was moved near one of the gates of the Transylvania barracks, leaving room for another monument, the Victory Monument. In 1964 the barracks was demolished to make way for the construction of the Continental Hotel, and in 1974 the monument returned in front of the former town hall, where it had been originally located and where it is now. Because it was severely damaged during the December 1989 Revolution, the bullet-cut sculpture ensemble was restored in 1992–1993. The last restoration of the monument was done in May–September 2015 by Ion Oprescu, a local decorator and restorer.

== Description ==
The structural composition is made of Leitha limestone, from the Vienna area, and sandstone was also used in the composition of the central core.

The ensemble has as main characters John of Nepomuk, the patron saint of Catholicism in Banat and Mary who holds lily flowers in her hand, a symbol of purity. Sts. Roch, Charles Borromeo and Sebastian appear in the background. The legend of St. John of Nepomuk is engraved on three sides of the base of the monument: the confession of the Queen of Bohemia, the inquisitor of King Charles who wants to break the sacrament of confession, and the punishment of the Prague canon thrown from the bridge into the Vltava in Prague. Following the torment he endured, through sanctification, he became St. John of Nepomuk, protector of Bohemia, shipowners, raftsmen, priests, millers, and secret keepers.
