= Old Town Hall of Timișoara =

Old Town Hall
- Romanian: Primăria Veche; German: Altes Rathaus
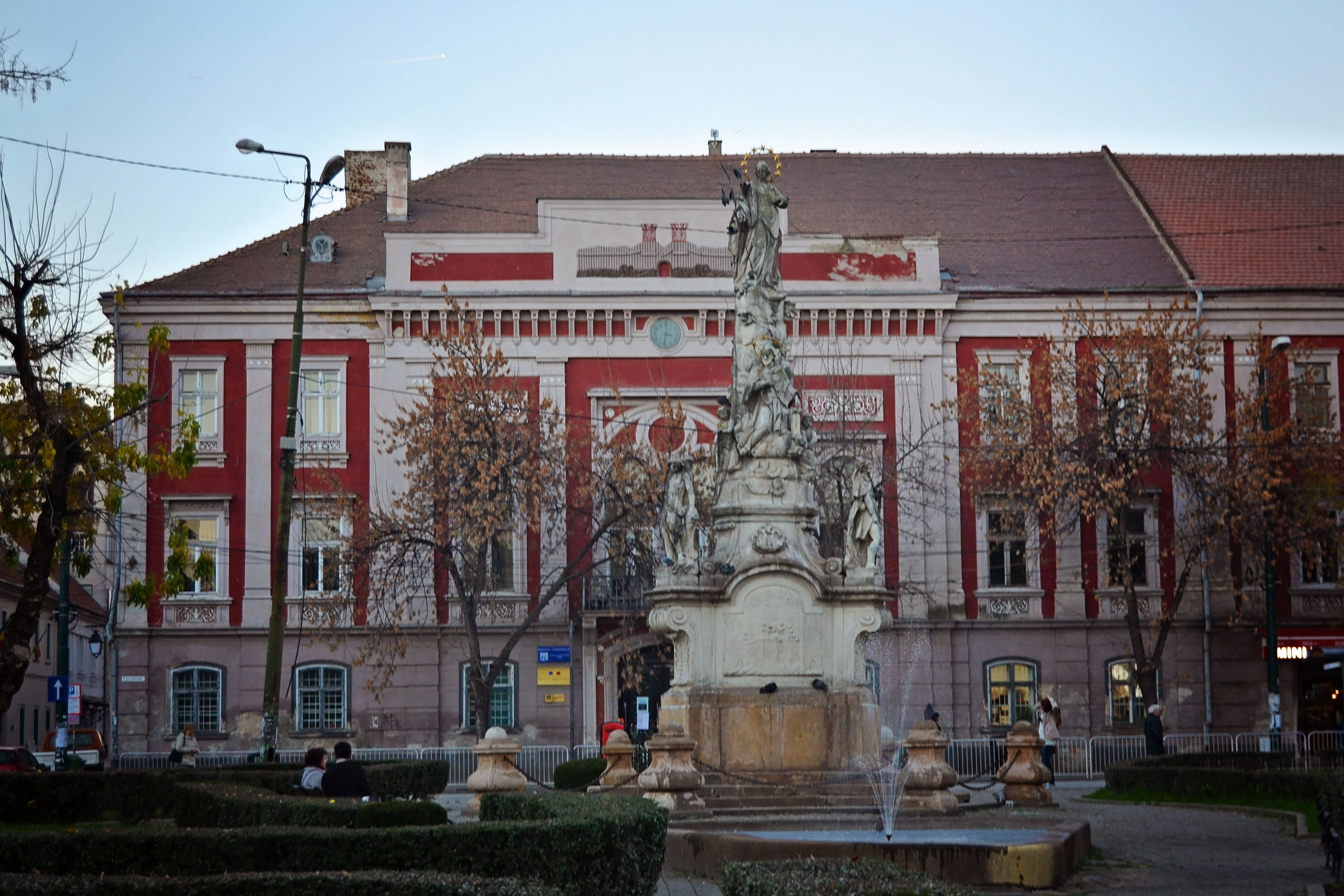
- Interactive map of the Old Town Hall area
- Former names: German Town Hall

General information
- Architectural style: Eclectic, classical
- Location: Liberty Square, Timișoara
- Coordinates: 45°45′22″N 21°13′39″E
- Construction started: 1731
- Completed: 1734
- Renovated: 1782, 1853, 1935

Design and construction
- Architect: Pietro del Bonzo

Renovating team
- Architect: Josef Aigner

The Old Town Hall (Romanian: Primăria Veche; German: Altes Rathaus) is a historical monument in the Liberty Square of Timișoara, Romania.

== History ==
The Old Town Hall was built between 1731 and 1734, after the conquest of Timișoara by the Austrians, when the German colonists settled here asked the authorities for their own town hall. This is how the German Town Hall (German: Deutsches Rathaus) appeared, also called the New Town Hall (German: Neues Rathaus) to differentiate it from the old Serbian one located somewhere further north of Cetate. The foundation stone was laid by the then mayor Peter Solderer on 24 December 1731; he would be re-elected for a new term in this building in 1735. The building was designed by the Italian architect Pietro del Bonzo and housed the city council between 1737 and 1949.

In the middle of the 18th century, the bourgeoisie wanting to socialize in an elegant setting had few decent places for the parties held on Saturday evening, so that, in 1753, a ballroom was set up on the first floor, in the boardroom. In 1781 it was known as the City Hall of the Royal Free City of Timișoara (German: Rathaus der Königlichen Freien Stadt Temeswar), and the following year, 1782, it was rebuilt by the builder Josef Aigner; the facade is restored in Renaissance style and the emblem is changed because Timișoara changes its status, becoming a royal free city.

In 1849, the building was damaged by artillery bombardment during the Hungarian Revolution. Also in the same period, 1848–1849, the Austrian commander of the fortress, the baron of Croatian origin Field Marshal-Lieutenant Juraj Rukavina Vidovgradski, installed two loaded cannons in front of the town hall to intimidate the revolutionaries. The cannons were ultimately not used. Another renovation took place in 1853. On this occasion, the traces of the bombings were removed and the building received its new facade, the one that exists to this day. At the end of the 19th century and the beginning of the 20th century there were a few more repairs, but they did not influence the general style and proportions of the edifice. During the mid-20th century, after the City Hall moved to its current headquarters, a union committee of trade workers, a wood industry trust, the former ADAS, a cooperative, the Cadastre Office and, later, the Agricultural Directorate functioned in the building. Currently, it houses the Faculty of Music of the West University.

=== Ottoman Turkish inscription ===
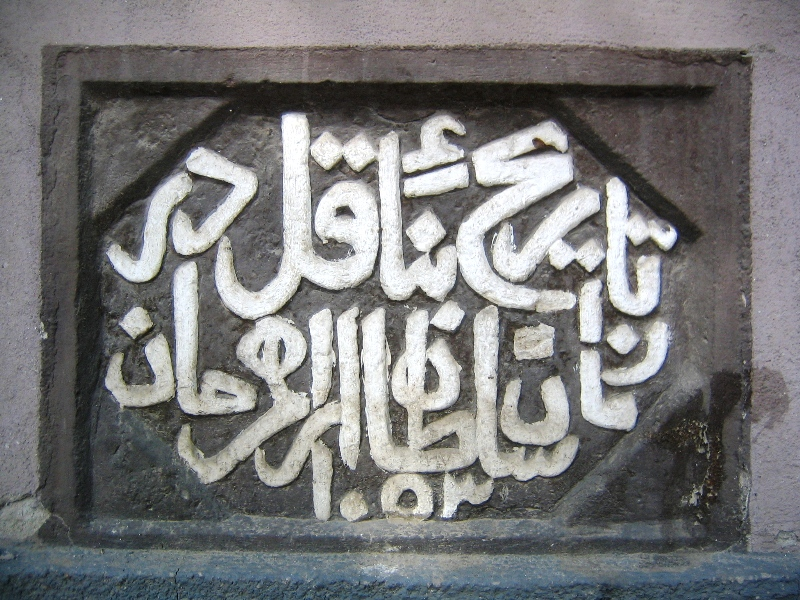
The Ottoman Turkish inscription

On the right side of the entrance gate there is an inscription in Ottoman Turkish with Arabic characters. Most researchers believe that the inscription refers to the existing hamam (Turkish bathhouse) on the eastern side of the Liberty Square: Year of erection of this bath, from the time of terror under Ibrahim Ehan, Hedşa 1053. The inscription is actually the only public testimony of the Ottoman rule in the city. According to other researchers, the inscription would have a different translation and would have been originally posted on the walls of the Timișoara Fortress, as it is suggested in the travel journal of Evliya Çelebi, who passed through the Temeşvar Eyalet in 1660:

Osmanlıca

تاريخ بناء قل كبر
زمان صلطان ابراهيم خان
١٠٥٣

Roman transliteration

Tarih bina kale kebir
zaman Sultan Ibrahim Khan
1053

English translation

Date of construction of the great fortress
during Sultan Ibrahim Khan
1643

== Architecture ==
From an architectural point of view, the building is made in an eclectic style, with classicist elements, specific to the half of the 19th century. Throughout history, the facade of the town hall has been redone several times. The old facade was symmetrical, with a gate in the middle, above which is a balcony and the four arched windows of the former boardroom.

It is structured on three levels: a ground floor at the level of the street pavement and two high floors. The facade of the ground floor is less ornate and has a visual role as a pedestal for the columns on the upper floors. Above the monumental gate there is a balcony with wrought metal hardware and four arched windows that unfold on the two floors. The whole facade of the building is fragmented by numerous boxes delimited by pilasters, each box containing two vertically arranged windows. On the frontispiece of the building there is an image of a bportion of the Turkish Timișoara wall, a palisade wall interrupted by Prince Eugene's gate.
