= Anton Scudier Central Park =

Park in Timișoara, Romania

- Parcul Central „Anton Scudier”
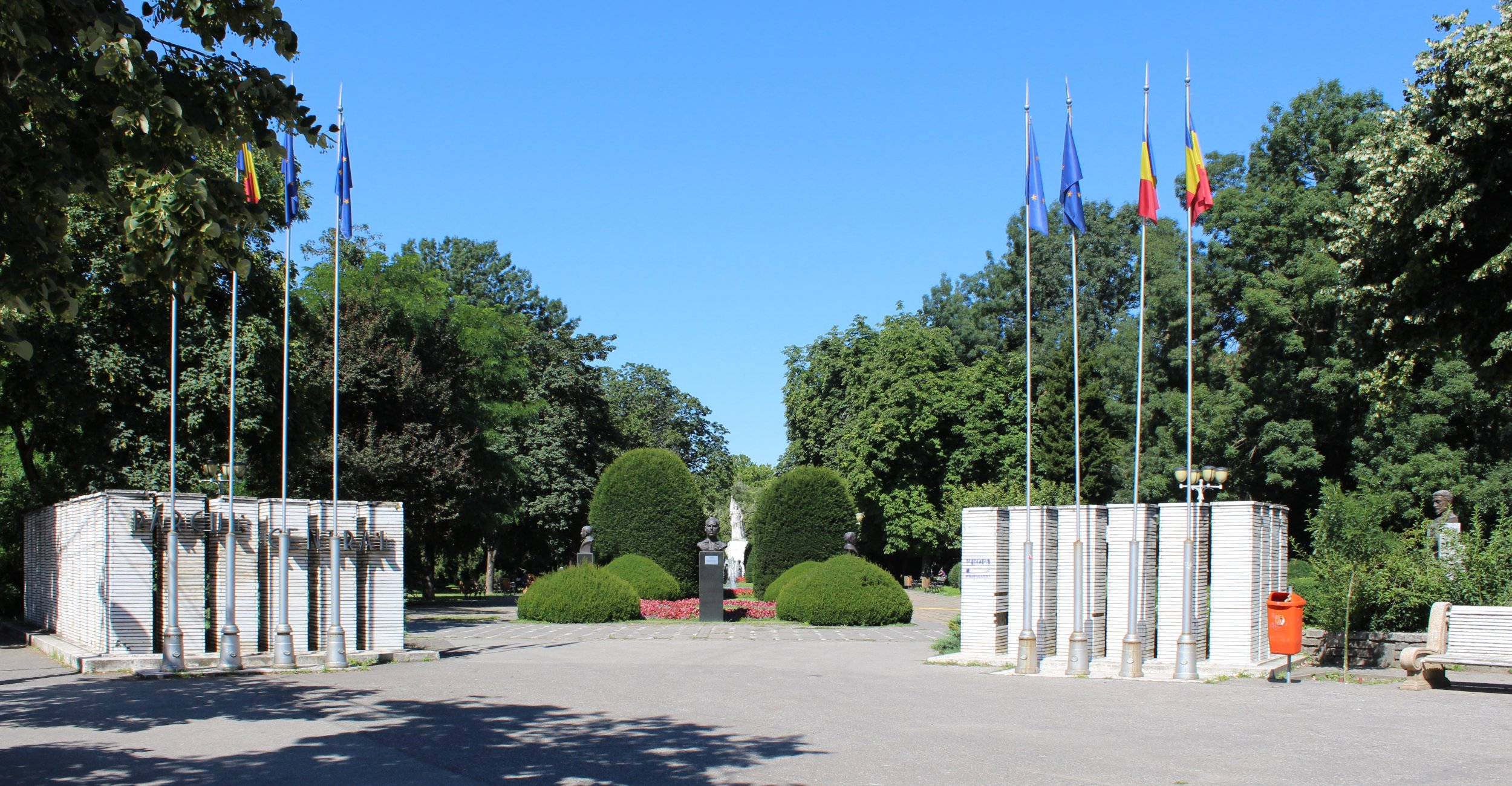
- Interactive map of Anton Scudier Central Park
- Type: Urban park
- Location: Timișoara, Timiș County, Romania
- Coordinates: 45°45′5″N 21°13′13″E
- Area: 7.91 ha
- Established: 1870
- Founder: Anton Scudier
- Owned by: Timișoara City Hall
- Species: 83

Anton Scudier Central Park, formerly known as Stalin Park and Scudier Park, is an urban park in Timișoara. It was founded in 1870 by General Anton Scudier and carried his name until the partition of Banat in 1919. In the early 1950s the park was called Stalin Park, then Central Park. It received its current name in 2015.

== History ==
Between 1738 and 1771 there was a cemetery on the site of the current Central Park, where about 8,000–9,000 people were buried, most of them dead during the plague epidemic of 1738–1739. After the arrangement of the cemetery in Calea Lipovei, the one on the site of the current park was closed, and in the 60s and 70s of the 19th century, General Anton Scudier, as military commander of Banat, decided to transform the old civil and military cemetery into an English landscape park. The remains of those buried here were exhumed by soldiers and, after a religious service, were reburied in the cemetery in Calea Lipovei.

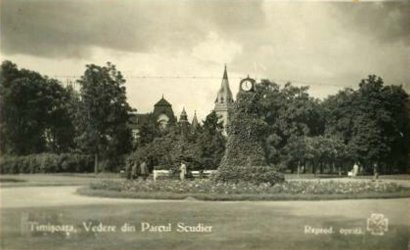
Scudier Park between the two world wars

The swampy and insalubrious land was drained and leveled, and in 1879 the Park Association, founded by the inhabitants of Iosefin and Elisabetin, planted trees and took care of its arrangement, initially in English style, with large lawns and alleys that intersected in the middle of the park. The remaining trees from that period are few in number: planes, probably produced in Alfred Mühle's nursery, some oaks and ashes, representatives of the local flora and some exotic specimens of American black walnut, Japanese pagoda tree and horse chestnut. The park, which occupies an area of over nine hectares, was taken over by the town hall in 1905 to be cared for; during this period decorative species such as yews, chestnuts, pines, walnuts or hickories were planted here. In the middle of the Scudier Park was a music pavilion. In 1912, a World Diorama (Weltdiorama) was installed here. In 1903, a pavilion was built for the presentation and sale of furniture. Between the two world wars, exhibitions of painters from Timișoara were organized in this pavilion. Until 1932, the railway line that connected Timișoara with Baziaș passed through the middle of the park.

From the early 1950s until 1955 the park was called Stalin Park, then Central Park. It received its current name in 2015. Between 2017 and 2019, the park was redesigned in Viennese style, reminiscent of the Schönbrunn Gardens.

== Monuments ==
=== Statue of Anton Scudier ===
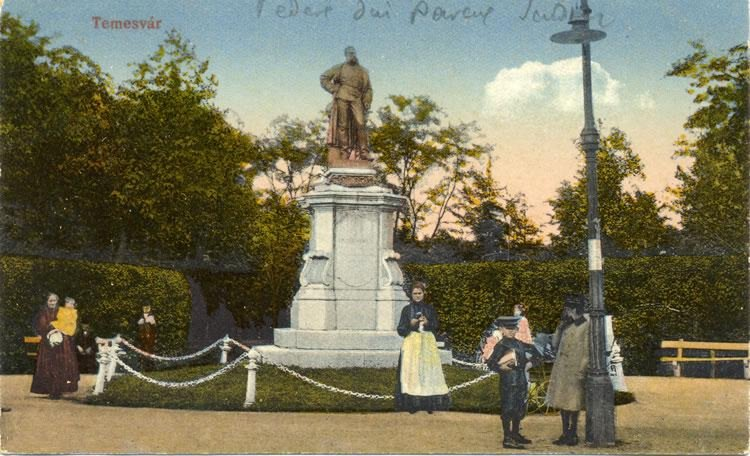
Statue of Anton Scudier before 1918

In 1881, a life-size gilded cast iron statue of General Scudier was placed in the park. The statue was destroyed on 26 October 1918, during the unrest caused by the dissolution of Austria-Hungary; later, a clock was installed on its pedestal.

=== Monument of the Romanian Soldier ===
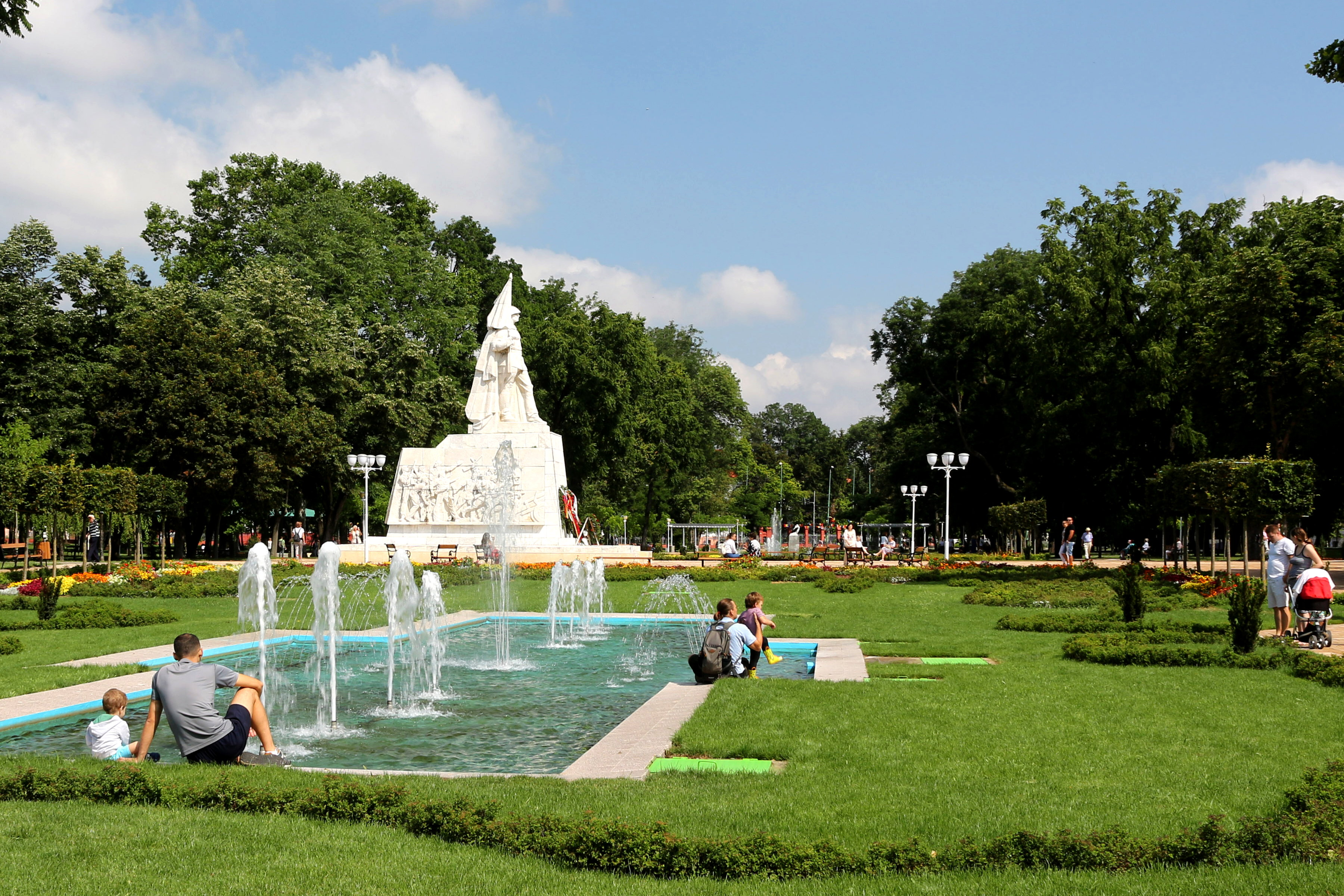
Monument of the Romanian Soldier

Today, on the site of the former Scudier's statue, the Monument of the Romanian Soldier is placed. Sculpted by Ion Vlad from Rușchița marble, the monument was unveiled on 30 December 1962 and was originally dedicated to the "liberating Soviet soldier". In 2013, a local PNȚCD councilor proposed the removal of the monument from the park to the Heroes' Cemetery in Calea Lipovei, which also houses the graves of Russian soldiers who died in World War II. The proposal was criticized by the Union of Fine Artists of Timișoara, in whose opinion the monument is an important work of artistic value.

=== Alley of Personalities ===
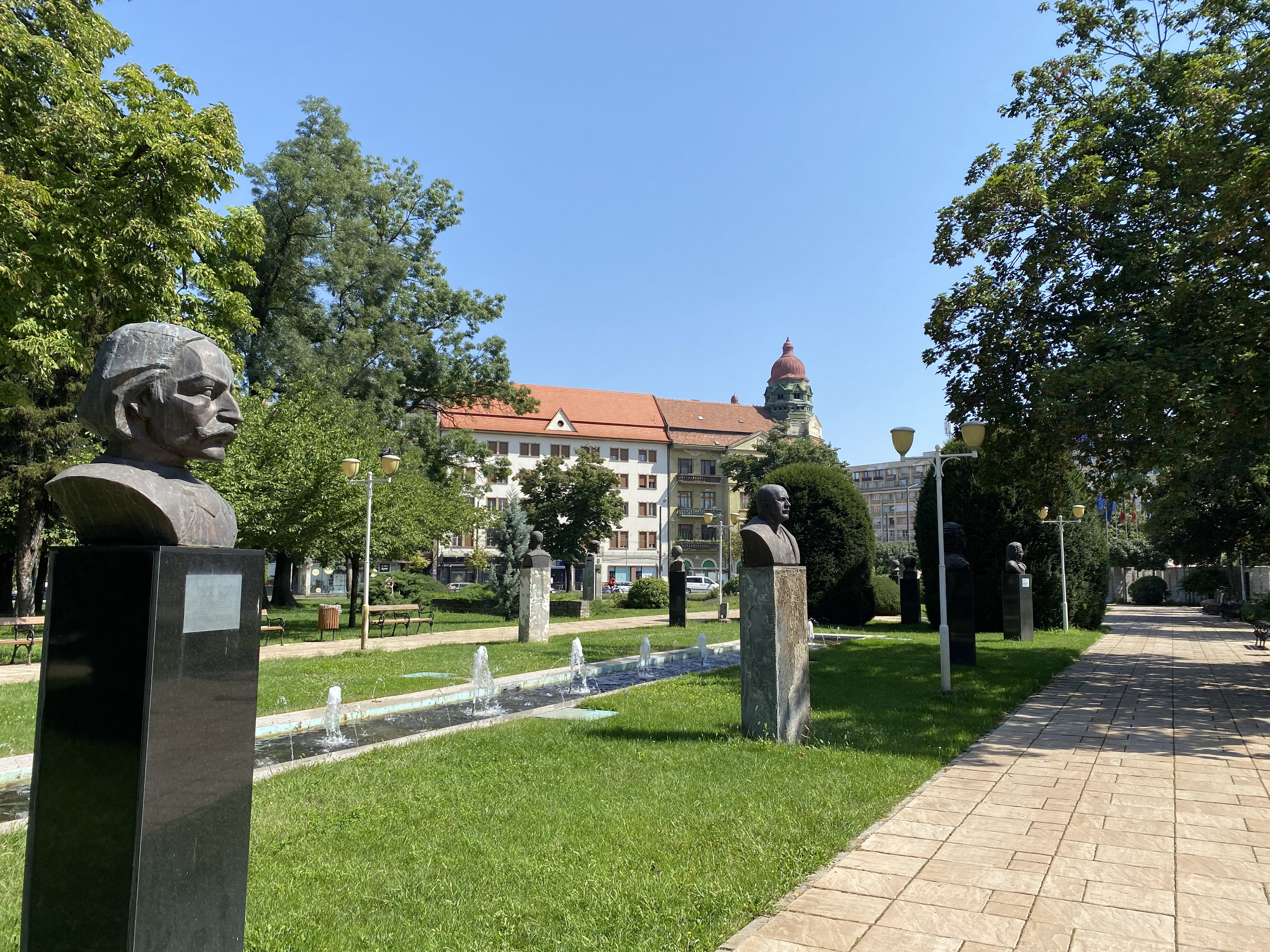
Busts on the Alley of Personalities

Established in 2009, the Alley of Personalities (Romanian: Aleea Personalităților) is an open-air museum, where 26 bronze busts of some prominent local personalities are exhibited. The busts are placed clockwise, with Sever Bocu's bust near the entrance from the cathedral:

1. Sever Bocu (1874–1951); 2. Aurel Cosma (1867–1931); 3. Eugene of Savoy (1663–1736); 4. Claude Florimond de Mercy (1666–1734); 5. Carol Telbisz (1854–1914); 6. John Hunyadi (1406–1456); 7. Deliu Petroiu (1922–2008); 8. Ion Românu (1918–1980); 9. Pius Brânzeu (1911–2002); 10. Edouard Pamfil (1912–1994); 11. Gheorghe Tohăneanu (1925–2008); 12. Nicolae Boboc (1920–1999); 13. Anghel Dumbrăveanu (1933–2013)	1. Charles I of Hungary (1288–1342); 2. Zsigmond Ormós (1813–1894); 3. Corneliu Miklosi (1887–1963); 4. Dositej Obradović (1739–1811); 5. Ioachim Miloia (1897–1940); 6. Romulus Ladea (1901–1970); 7. Virgil Birou (1903–1968); 8. Béla Bartók (1881–1945); 9. János Török (1843–1892); 10. Karl Küttel (1818–1875); 11. Stan Vidrighin (1876–1956); 12. Eugen Todoran (1918–1997); 13. Nicolae Corneanu (1923–2014)

== Uszoda ==
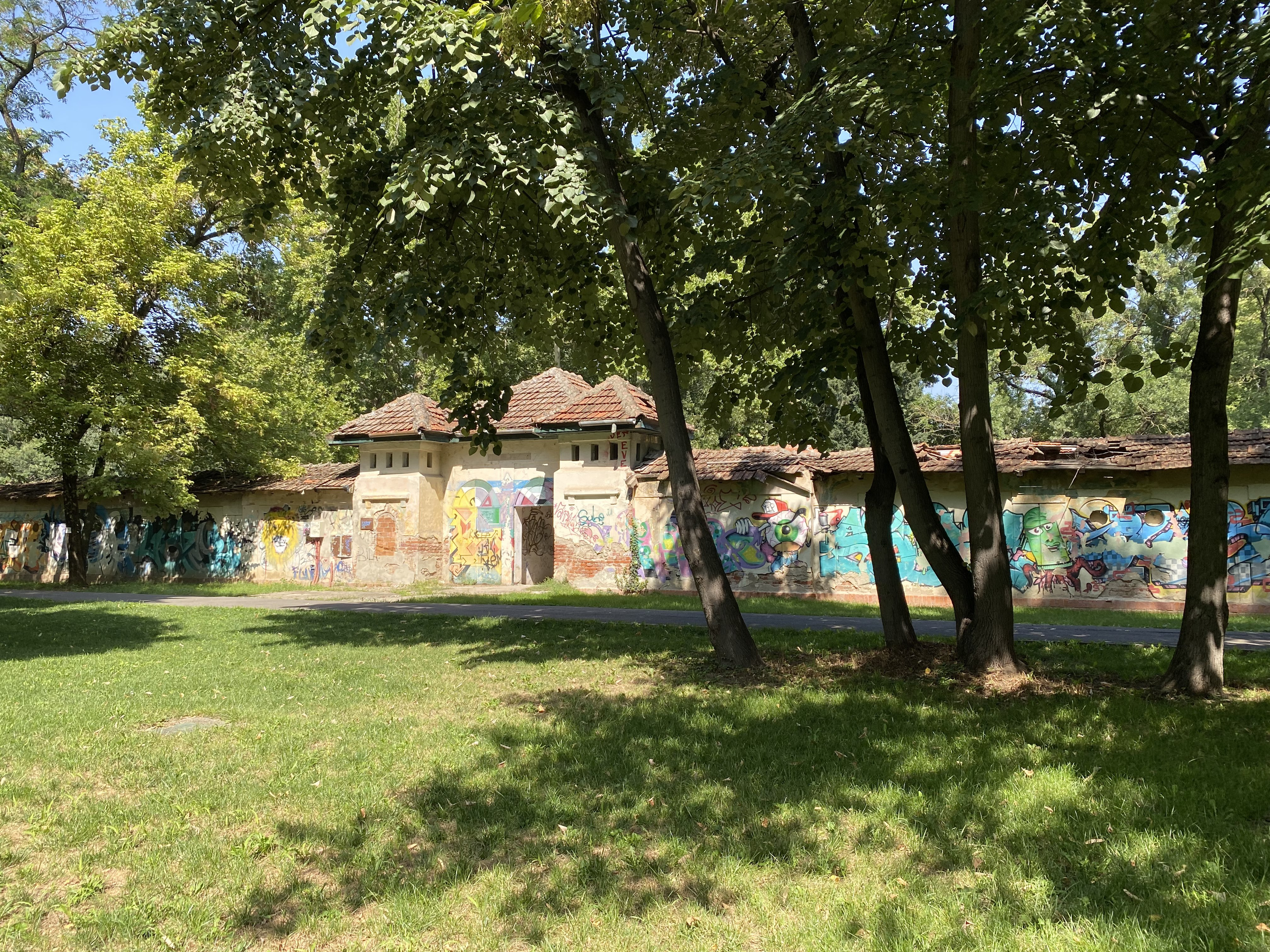
The abandoned building of the Uszoda sports center

A notable landmark at the southern edge of Central Park is the former Uszoda sports complex (Hungarian for "swimming center"). Built in 1926 as a recreational facility with swimming pools, it served as the training ground for Timișoara's water polo team, which went on to win 10 national championships.

Covering 4,500 square meters, the complex remained under the administration of the Ministry of Education until 2016, when ownership was transferred to Timișoara City Hall. At that time, the city authorities proposed demolishing the site and converting it into green space, but the plan was ultimately abandoned following protests from local residents.

The basketball court was renovated in 2023, and in 2026 the communal baths were included in a restoration initiative led by the Ambulanța pentru Monumente association.
