= Great Plague of 1738 =

Bubonic plague outbreak in the Balkan Peninsula

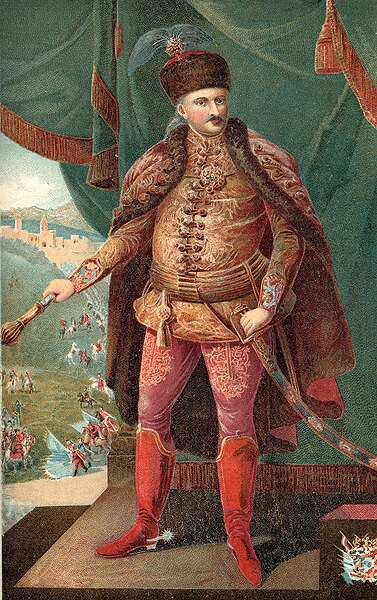
Sándor Károlyi led the response to the plague.

The Great Plague of 1738 was an outbreak of the bubonic plague between 1738 and 1743 that affected areas of the Habsburg Empire, now in the modern nations of Romania, Hungary, Ukraine, Serbia, Croatia, Slovakia, Czechia, and Austria. Despite the name, the plague occurred for at least 5 years, from 1738 to 1743. Medical technology at the time was not properly able to detect bacterium, although Europeans were aware of them.

In February 1738, the plague hit the Banat region, having been spread there by the Imperial Army. Southeastern Transylvania may have been the hardest area hit. Over the following eight years, the plague killed a sixth of the population of Timișoara. Timișoara's St. Mary and St. John of Nepomuk Monument is dedicated to the plague's victims. The plague would return to hit the city again in 1762–1763. Other cities in the region were also stricken. Between October 1737 and April 1738, 111 deaths were reported in Zărneşti, and 70 in Codlea. More than 10% of the population of Cluj-Napoca was reported to have been killed by the pandemic.

The disease's spread extended to the Adriatic. It made its way to the island of Brač in modern-day Croatia. According to the 1740 Hungarian Diet, the Great Plague claimed 36,000 lives.

== Timeline ==
This is an approximate timeline of the plague.

- January 1738: Debrecen begins precautions as plague approaches from the Ottoman Empire through Transylvania.
- May 1739: Debrecen is declared infected and placed under lockdown.
- 1739: Gates, houses, markets, work, travel, and funerals are regulated; burial customs become a major source of conflict.
- May and August 1739: Major riots break out over plague regulations, especially burial restrictions.
- April 1740: Debrecen is released from nearly one year of quarantine.
- 1740–1741: Recovery, punishment of violators, thanksgiving services, and continued restrictions on merriment.
- August–December 1742: Plague threatens and then re-enters Debrecen; a second lockdown begins.
- February 1743: Debrecen receives exemption from lockdown and gradually returns to normal.
- 1739–1743: Criminal trials involving illegal healing, witchcraft, and folk-magical practices accompany the epidemic crisis.

== Government actions ==
In May 1739, Count Sándor Károlyi, the Royal High Commissioner for Health of the Trans-Tisza Region, declared Debrecen infected and imposed a lockdown. The city council then implemented the regulations of the Royal Governor General, restricting agricultural work, markets, social gatherings, movement, infected houses, and funerary practices.

== Contemporary accounts ==
Contemporary evidence for the Debrecen plague comes from administrative records, petitions, printed regulations, medical writing, and criminal proceedings produced during the epidemic itself.

=== City precautions and official lockdown, 1738–1739 ===
- In January 1738, Debrecen began taking precautions as plague approached from the Ottoman Empire through Transylvania. The city gates were closed and guarded.
- In May 1739, Count Sándor Károlyi, the Royal High Commissioner for Health of the Trans-Tisza Region, declared Debrecen infected and imposed a lockdown.
- The city council then implemented the regulations of the Royal Governor General, restricting agricultural work, markets, social gatherings, movement, infected houses, and funerary practices.

=== Debrecen city council records, 1739–1743 ===
- The handwritten records of the Debrecen city council preserve many of the local conflicts created by plague regulations.
- The city established plague hospitals, closed and guarded infected houses, created a separate plague cemetery, and hired bearers and carters to remove the dead.
- Visitation of the dead, ceremonial burials, and burial feasts were prohibited. These restrictions were repeatedly violated. Inhabitants concealed deaths, buried bodies in courtyards, gathered at houses of the dead, sent away official bearers, mingled with quarantined people, and accompanied the dead to the cemetery.
- One guard who abandoned his post explained on 1 June 1739 that his “soul is weeping inside” because he could no longer bury the dead as before.

=== György Buzinkai's plague treatise, 1739 ===
- The most important contemporary medical publication was György Buzinkai's 1739 plague treatise, Rövid Oktatás, translated by Kristóf as A Short Instruction: How to Protect Ourselves Against the Plague, or How to Treat the Plague-Stricken.
- Buzinkai, the city doctor of Debrecen, framed the epidemic partly in religious terms, referring to the city's sins and the need for daily prayer.
- Most of the treatise, however, concerned practical “external” remedies. These included herbs, fumigation, vinegar, tobacco mixtures, citrus peel, medicinal drinks, bloodletting, emetics, sudatory drugs, herbal teas, poultices, animal dressings, and treatment of buboes.

=== Petitions from recovered plague victims, July 1739 ===
- Petitions from recovered plague victims preserve contemporary religious descriptions of the epidemic.
- In July 1739, some petitioners asked the city council to lift quarantine from their houses.
- These petitioners described the plague as “the Sorrowful example of this ordinary judgement by the wise will of God” and as “the sign of the manifested judgement of God’s majesty.”
- Such language shows that providential interpretations were not limited to pastors or officials, but were also used by inhabitants seeking relief from quarantine.

=== Riot records and rebel voices, 1739 ===
- The records of the 1739 riots preserve additional voices from the crisis.
- Chief Judge Márton Domonkos described the rebellious crowd as “day labourers, apprentices and such lot.”
- István Patay emerged as a leader of the rebellion, urging the crowd to march on city hall and remove the council.
- Women were also prominent in the unrest. According to the city council, they were especially involved in escaping locked houses, visiting relatives, gathering around the dead, and accompanying bodies despite the regulations.
- In one quoted outburst, a woman denounced the armed forces and threatened violent revenge against the commanding officer.

=== Debrecen letter patent, 30 December 1742 ===
- A second major contemporary text was the printed letter patent issued by the Debrecen city council on 30 December 1742, during the second wave of the epidemic.
- Probably written with pastoral assistance, the document repeated the regulations of the Royal Governor General while giving them a religious explanation.
- It interpreted plague as punishment from God, whose anger had been provoked by human sin, and described the epidemic with biblical language as the “scourge of the Plague.”
- At the same time, it defended quarantine and other practical measures as necessary “external means” of preserving life and argued that such measures were not contrary to conscience.

=== Views attributed to violators and rebels, 1742 ===
- The 1742 letter patent also recorded the views attributed to violators and rebels.
- It stated that some inhabitants rejected plague regulations because they believed God had fixed the limits of human life.
- Others denied the contagiousness of plague by pointing to people who had contact with plague patients but did not become infected.
- The document also accused inhabitants of following “the uneducated” and “sorcerers” rather than those endowed with “wisdom and science.”

=== Criminal records on folk healing and magic, 1739–1743 ===
- Criminal records from 1739–1743 show the place of folk healing and magical practice during the epidemic.
- The city council conducted twenty-one trials involving accusations of “unlearnt,” “illegal,” or “diabolic” healing, witchcraft, fortune-telling, or supernatural knowledge.
- One named figure was János Kis, a “cunning shepherd” who treated plague sufferers with herbal or magical remedies.
- Kis was repeatedly expelled from Debrecen but returned to continue offering treatment.

== See also ==
- Black Death
- Bubonic plague
- Second plague pandemic

== Sources ==
- Kristóf, Ildikó Sz. (2020). ""His Soul Is Weeping inside That He Cannot Bury the Dead as before." Plague and Rebellion in Debrecen (Hungary), 1739–1742". Religions. 11 (12) 687. doi:10.3390/rel11120687.
