= Mathias Rukavina von Boynograd =

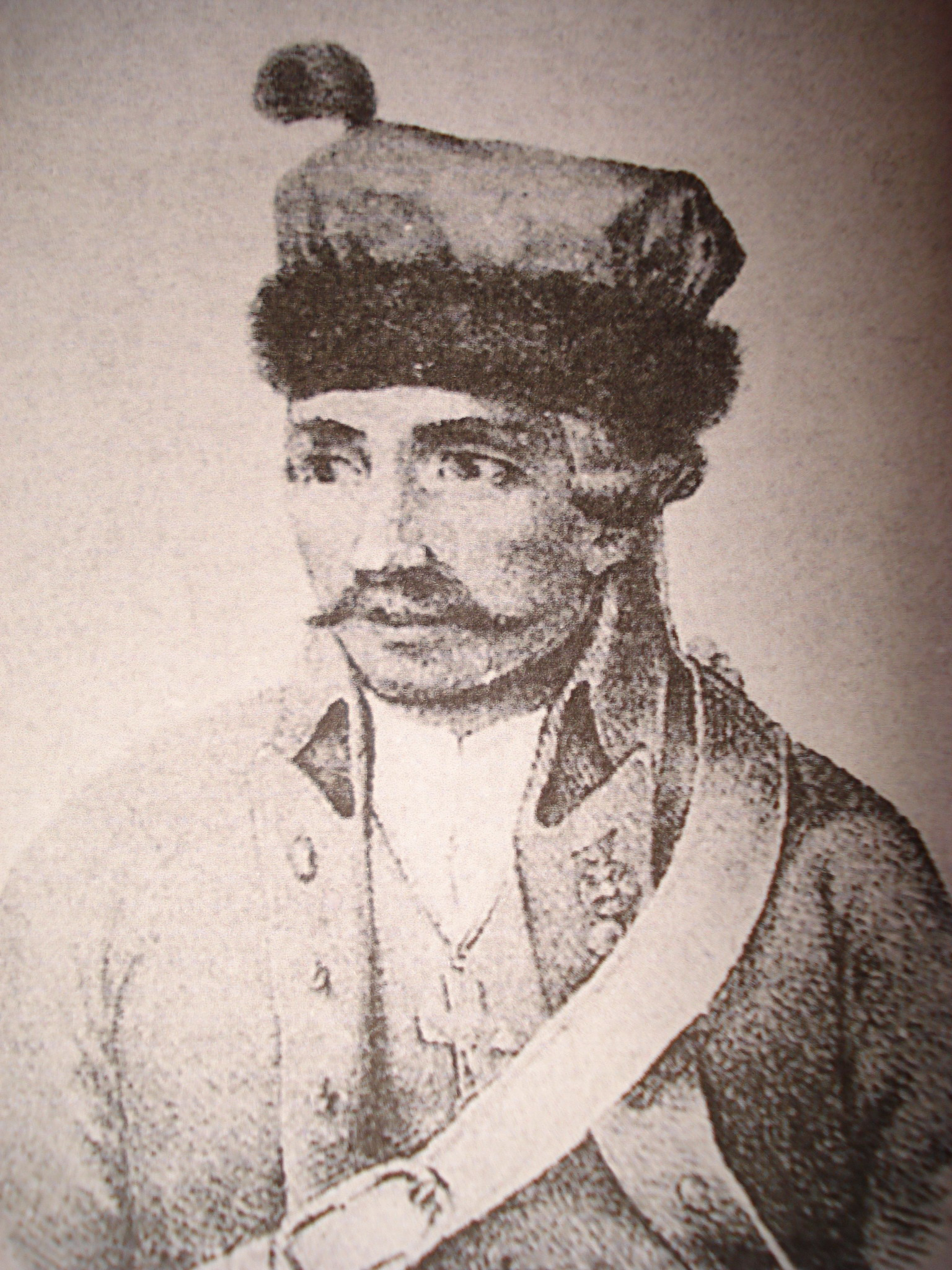
- Matija Rukavina Bojnogradski (Croatian)
- Born: 1737; Trnovac, Military Frontier (near Gospić)
- Died: 3 May 1817 (aged 79–80); Vienna, Austrian Empire
- Military career
- Allegiance: Habsburg monarchy
- Branch: Army
- Service years: 1755−1804
- Rank: Feldmarschall-Leutnant
- Conflicts: Seven Years' War; Austro-Turkish War (1788–1791); War of the First Coalition
- Awards: Military Order of Maria Theresa, KC 1796
- Other work: Inhaber, Infantry Regiment Nr. 52

Mathias Rukavina von Boynograd (Note: Croatian: Matija Rukavina Bojnogradski, also Mathias Rukawina, Mathias Ruccavina, Mate Rukavina,) (1737 − 3 May 1817) was a Croatian general in the Habsburg monarchy imperial army service. He joined the army in 1755 and fought against the Kingdom of Prussia, Ottoman Turkey, and the French First Republic. For most of his career he served with the light infantry from the military border with Turkey. He earned the rank of general officer during the French Revolutionary Wars, distinguishing himself at Loano. During the 1796 Italian campaign, he commanded a brigade in several battles against the French army led by Napoleon Bonaparte. He was Inhaber (Proprietor) of an Austrian infantry regiment in 1803–1804.

== Early career ==
Born in Trnovac (near Gospić in Lika region), in 1737, Rukavina was the son of Oberleutnant Josef (Croatian: Josip) Rukavina and Susanna von Startschewitsch (Starčević). He enlisted in a Hungarian regiment and fought with distinction during the Seven Years' War. Afterward, he served with the Grenz infantry (also known as Croats). He won promotion to major in 1778. He attained the social title of Ritter on 15 October 1779, adding von Boynograd to his surname. He was appointed to the rank of Oberstleutnant (lieutenant colonel) in 1786 and Oberst (colonel) in December 1789. During the Austro–Turkish War of 1787–1791 he was severely wounded twice. He married Elisabeth Lotters on 10 April 1792.

== Italian campaign ==
=== Loano ===
Rukavina transferred to Italy in 1794 as commander of two Carlstädter Grenz battalions. His promotion to Generalmajor occurred on 1 May 1795 while he was serving in northwest Italy. He was wounded in action that June. In fall 1795, the French Army of Italy received a new leader Barthélemy Louis Joseph Schérer. The army was organized into a 6,961-man right division led by Pierre Augereau and a 5,155-strong left division under Jean-Mathieu-Philibert Sérurier. André Masséna commanded 13,276 troops of the center, which was divided into divisions under Amédée Emmanuel Francois Laharpe and Étienne Charlet and a reserve led by Guilin Laurent Bizanet. Just as the French were about to launch an offensive, snow fell, causing the attack to be canceled. Desiring to attack before the end of the year, Schérer adopted Masséna's plan to break through the Austro-Sardinian army's center while Augereau attacked its left. While preparing for the assault, the French feigned going into winter quarters. By coincidence, the Austrian commander Joseph Nikolaus De Vins fell sick and was replaced by Olivier, Count of Wallis on 22 November 1795, the day the French attack began. On the Allied right Sérurier's attack was repulsed, but it was only a diversion.

In the Battle of Loano, Massena's thrust cracked the Austro-Sardinian center while Augereau assaulted troops under Wallis on the coast. Augereau's division was organized into brigades under Pierre Banel, Elzéar Auguste Cousin de Dommartin, Jean-Baptiste Dominique Rusca and Claude Perrin Victor. Rusca attacked a position called the Greater Castellaro defended by Rukavina but was driven off. Accordingly, Augereau posted Victor's brigade to observe the position while Rusca's troops pressed forward. Meanwhile, Dommartin's brigade was sent back to overcome some Austrians in the Chartreuse redoubt who later surrendered. By this time, Rukavina and his 1,000 defenders were totally cut off. Augereau repeatedly demanded the surrender of the Greater Castellaro, but was rebuffed. Rukavina, "smiling down from the parapet", indicated the place where he intended to break through Victor's brigade and announced, "There is where I mean to pass". Leading the charge of his soldiers in column, his attack punched through the French lines. Victor's troops rallied and punished the column with musket fire, but Rukavina and about half his men escaped. Even the French were impressed by this exploit. Wallis retreated on the morning of 24 November with Rukavina leading his rearguard.

=== Montenotte ===
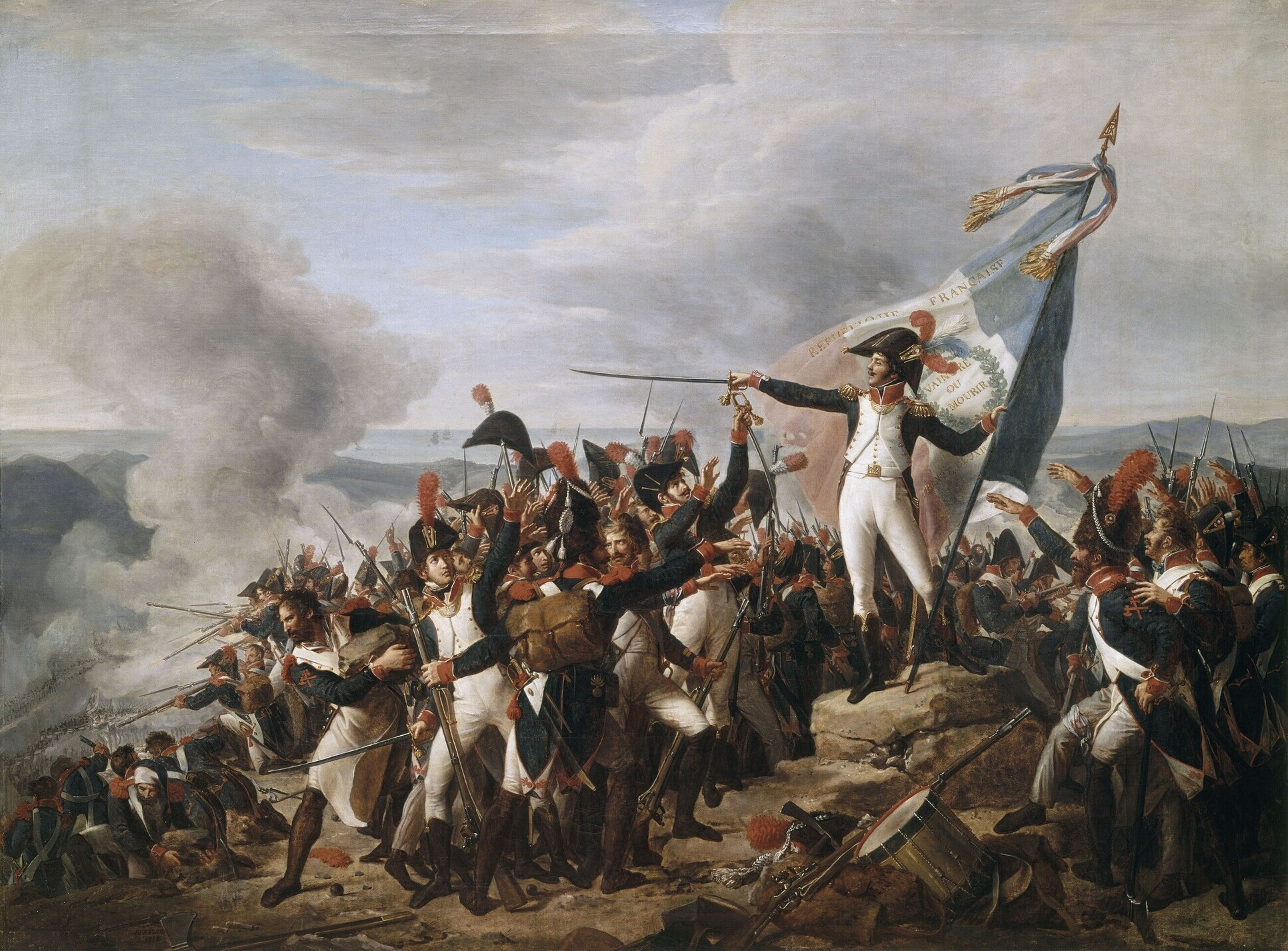
1812 painting of the Battle of Montenotte by René Théodore Berthon

The spring of 1796 found Rukavina leading a brigade in the division of Eugène-Guillaume Argenteau. That spring saw Johann Peter Beaulieu replace Wallis in command of the Habsburg army of Italy. Of the 28,523 soldiers, only 21,976 were fit and available for service in the field. This force fought alongside a Sardinian army numbering 20,000, including 5,000 Austrians. On 21 March an order arrived from Emperor Francis II instructing Beaulieu to send Rukavina with four battalions toward Ceva to assist the Sardinians. They would be replaced by four battalions from Pavia. On the 24th he received his orders to march. On 29 March Rukavina and two battalions occupied Dego while the remaining troops were established nearby. At that time his brigade consisted of about a battalion each of Infantry Regiments Grand Duke of Tuscany Nr. 23 and Priess Nr. 24 in Dego, one battalion of Brechainville Nr. 25 at Carretto and the 1st Battalion of the Carlstädter Grenz at Pareto and other villages. After being ordered to march to Sassello, Rukavina reported to Argenteau on 8 April that the road was so bad that it would take eight hours to return to Dego. By this time, the Habsburg army was massing his army for an attack and Rukavina was directed to return to Dego on the 9th. That day, Beaulieu scolded Argenteau for not acting more promptly.

On 10 April Beaulieu attacked and won a minor skirmish in the Battle of Voltri. Ordered to attack Savona from the northwest, Argenteau was unable to assemble a large force but directed his available troops to assemble at dawn on the 11th at Cascina Garbazzo near Montenotte Superiore. Rukavina left Dego with one battalion of Infantry Regiment Stein Nr. 50 and picked up one battalion of Pellegrini Nr. 49 and three companies of the Gyulai Freikorps en route. Rukavina arrived at the rendezvous first and had to wait for Argenteau with the remaining three battalions. The entire force numbered only about 3,700. When the advance started, he led the way. Historian Martin Boycott-Brown wrote, "It was also Rukavina who engaged the enemy first, and it seems to have been entirely in character for him to do so. Mathias Rukavina was one of those fighting generals from the Borders who seem to have been happiest leading from the front".

The advance progressed 2 miles (3.2 km) before running into French patrols. The local French commander Antoine-Guillaume Rampon soon rushed to the scene with a battalion of the 17th Light Infantry Demi-brigade. Rukavina's troops slowly pressed back the French, allowing Argenteau's entire force to deploy by about 11:00 am. By this time a battalion of the French 32nd Line Infantry arrived. By noon the French were back in their main defensive position on Monte Negino. To attack the peak, the Austrian infantry were compelled to move downhill from Monte Pra, cross a very narrow ridge in single file and then toil 50 yards (46 m) uphill against a stone redoubt. Covered by the Freikorps acting as skirmishers and the fire of two cannons, Infantry Regiment Archduke Anton Nr. 52 assaulted first and was thrown back. Encouraged by Rampon, the outnumbered French repulsed three attacks altogether. During the combat, Rukavina was struck in the shoulder by a musket ball and the commander of the Pellegrini battalion also became a casualty. Argenteau finally called off the attacks, hoping for better luck the following day when some reinforcements were due. The wounded Rukavina worried that stopping the assault was a mistake. Rampon estimated 200–300 Austrian casualties while another source put the figure at 100. Rukavina was not able to continue in command.

The French victory in the Battle of Montenotte was completed on 12 April when French commander Napoleon Bonaparte concentrated about 25,000 troops near Carcare. To oppose them, Argenteau's division only had 9,000 scattered men and Giovanni Marchese di Provera was nearby with 2,000 more. Bonaparte directed Laharpe with 7,000 French troops to attack from Monte Negino while Masséna with 4,000 advanced from the south. After the defeat on the 12th, Argenteau frankly reported to Beaulieu that he was beaten and only had 700 men left. Having missed the day's combat, Rukavina was in Dego when he heard the bad news. On the morning of 14 April, he relinquished command of Dego because of his injury and retired to Acqui Terme, missing the Second Battle of Dego which began later that day.

=== Mantua ===
Rukavina led a brigade that included 2,583 infantry and 80 cavalry in Michelangelo Alessandro Colli-Marchi's left wing at the Battle of Borghetto on 30 May. When the French broke through the Austrian center at Valeggio, Colli marched north to close the breach. Realizing he was isolated, Colli sent his foot soldiers to join the garrison of Mantua. During the Siege of Mantua, Rukavina fell under the overall command of Joseph Canto d'Irles. He defended the Migliaretto entrenchments with 2,443 soldiers organized as one battalion of Carlstädter Grenzers, one battalion of the 2nd Garrison Infantry Regiment, and three battalions of the Terzi Infantry Regiment Nr. 16. Rukavina actively participated in siege operations and his Aide-de-camp was killed in a sortie on 16 July. When the French temporarily lifted the siege on 1 August before the Battle of Castiglione, D'Irles sent Rukavina to Valeggio sul Mincio to deliver a message to Dagobert Sigmund von Wurmser, the army commander. The remainder of the siege extended from 27 August 1796 to 2 February 1797.

== Later career ==
Rukavina received the Knight's Cross of the Military Order of Maria Theresa on 10 August 1796. He was appointed to the noble title of Freiherr on 16 October 1797. From July 1797 to October 1803, he commanded the military district of Dalmatia at Zadar (Zara) and was elevated to the rank of Feldmarschall-Leutnant on 10 April 1801. He briefly became Inhaber (Proprietor) of Rukavina Infantry Regiment Nr. 52 in 1803. When he retired from the army in 1804, he stepped down, becoming second proprietor of the regiment. He died in Penzing, Austrian Empire on 3 May 1817.

== See also ==
- List of Military Order of Maria Theresa recipients of Croatian descent

== Notes ==
Military offices
Preceded by Archduke Anton Victor of Austria	Proprietor (Inhaber) of Infantry Regiment Nr. 52; 1803–1804	Succeeded by Archduke Franz Karl of Austria
