= Constantin Diaconovici Loga Boulevard =

Boulevard in Timișoara, Romania

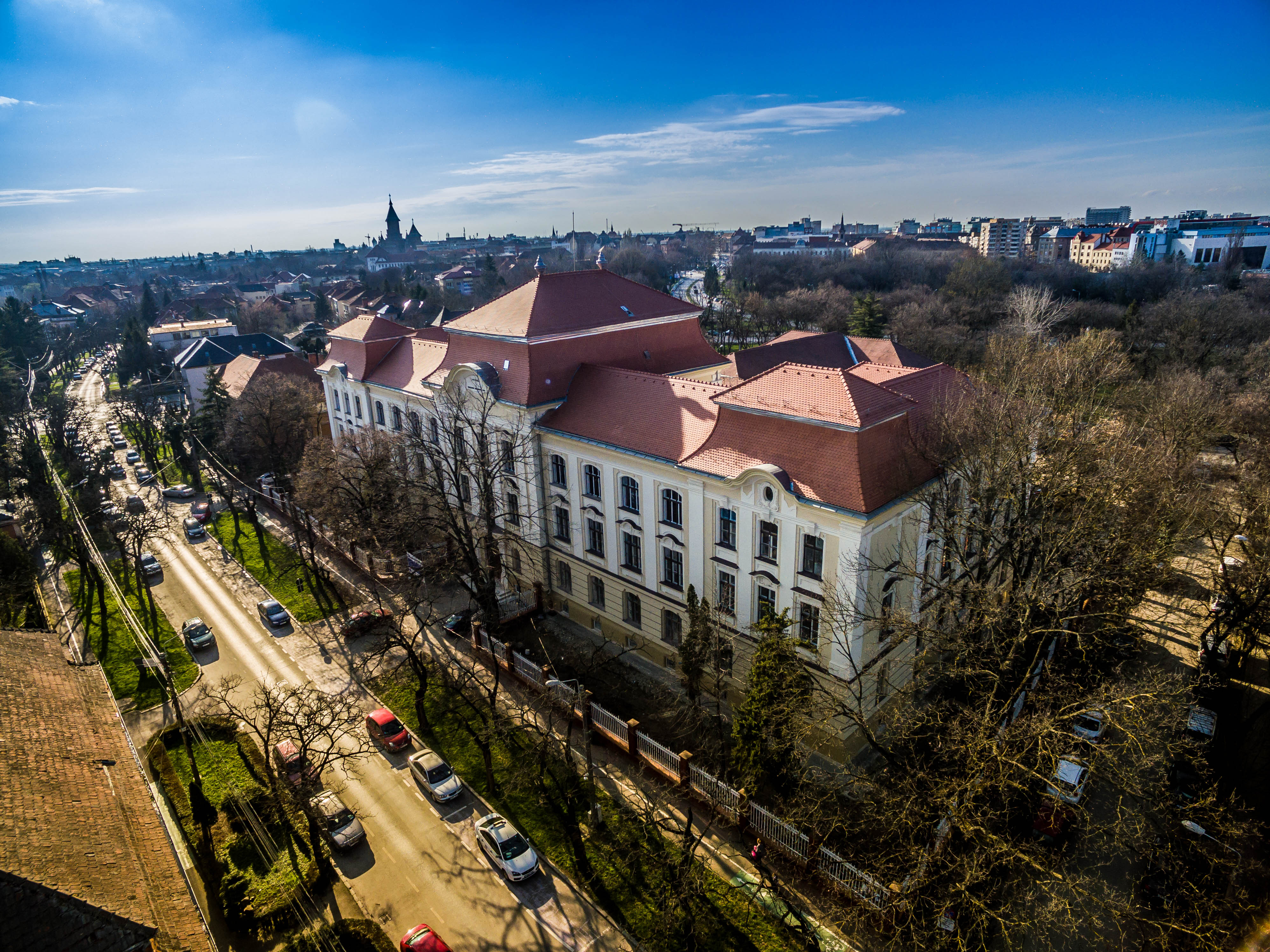
- Constantin Diaconovici Loga Boulevard and the namesake college
- Interactive map of Constantin Diaconovici Loga Boulevard
- Native name: Bulevardul Constantin Diaconovici Loga (Romanian)
- Former name(s): Nagykörút, Telbisz körút, Nikos Beloyannis Boulevard, Victory Boulevard
- Maintained by: Timișoara City Hall
- Length: 1,196.53 m (3,925.6 ft)
- Location: Cetate, Timișoara, Romania
- Coordinates: 45°45′4″N 21°13′53″E
- From: Metropolitan Cathedral
- To: Timiș County Prefecture

Constantin Diaconovici Loga Boulevard (Romanian: Bulevardul Constantin Diaconovici Loga) is a boulevard in Timișoara, Romania. Until 1990 it was known as Victory Boulevard (Romanian: Bulevardul Victoriei), when it was renamed after Constantin Diaconovici Loga (1770–1850), a local pedagogue and writer. Along the boulevard are several important landmarks, including Timișoara City Hall, the Timiș County School Inspectorate, the Banat Metropolitanate, Constantin Diaconovici Loga National College, and Carmen Sylva National Pedagogical College. During the communist era, the interwar-style houses that define the character of Constantin Diaconovici Loga Boulevard were used by the Securitate—the Romanian secret police—as sites for detention and interrogation.

== Names ==
Constantin Diaconovici Loga Boulevard has undergone several name changes throughout its history, reflecting the city's evolving political landscape.

During the Austro-Hungarian period, the boulevard was known as Nagykörút (Grand Boulevard) and Telbisz körút, named after Carol Telbisz, a prominent Banat Bulgarian public figure and long-time mayor of Timișoara. Telbisz played a significant role in the city's modernization, including the construction of wide boulevards and the introduction of electric trams.

In the communist era, the boulevard was renamed to honor Nikos Beloyannis, a Greek communist politician. Beloyannis was a prominent figure in the Greek resistance during World War II and later became a symbol of communist martyrdom after his execution in 1952. Renaming the boulevard to Nikos Beloyannis Boulevard was part of the broader effort to commemorate communist heroes and ideologies.
