= Palace of the Credit Bank =

- Palatul Băncii de Credit
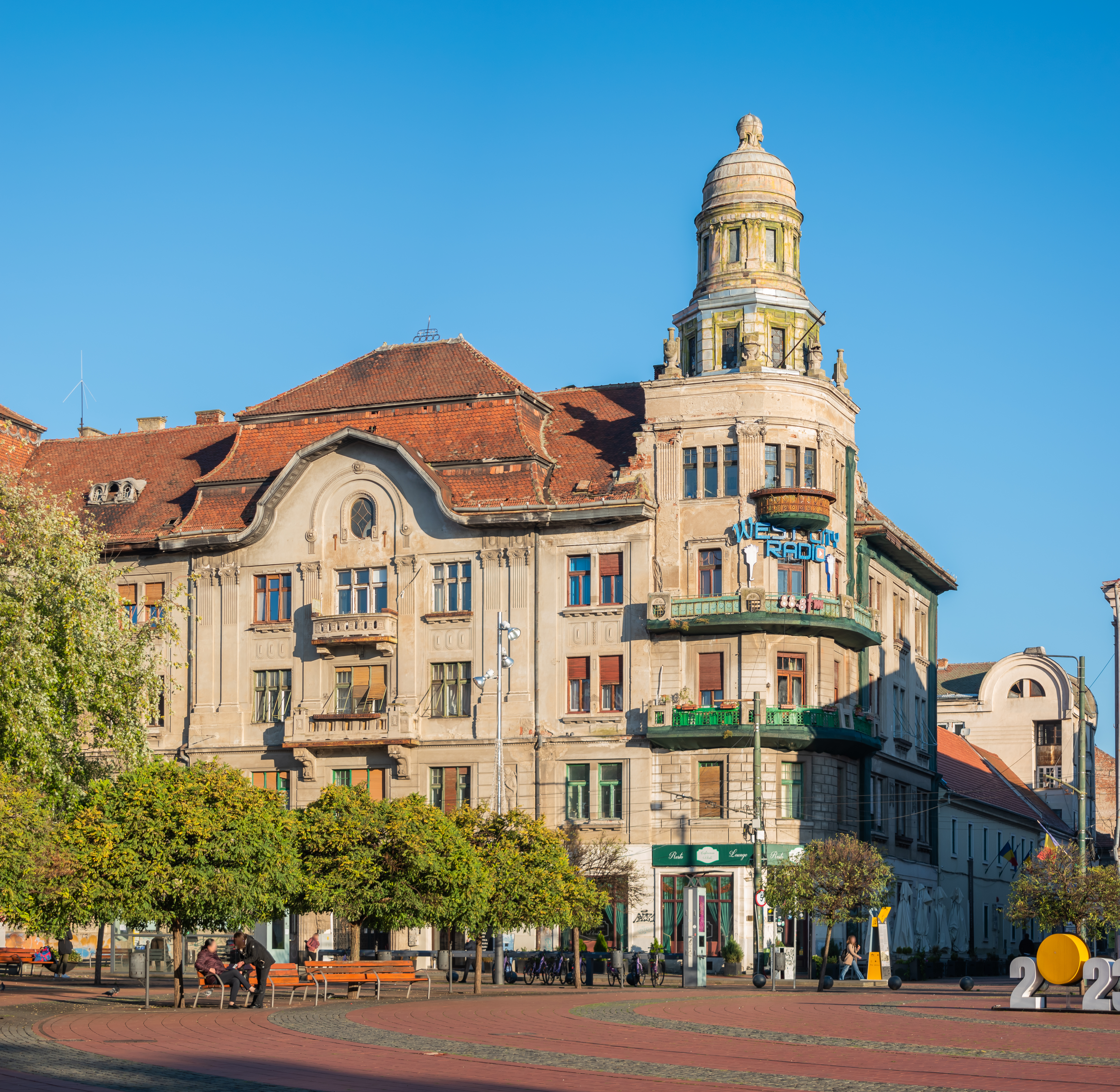
- Interactive map of the Palace of the Credit Bank area

General information
- Architectural style: Secession
- Location: Liberty Square, Timișoara, Romania
- Coordinates: 45°45′22″N 21°13′35″E
- Construction started: 1911
- Completed: 1912

Design and construction
- Architect: László Székely

The Palace of the Credit Bank (Romanian: Palatul Băncii de Credit) is a historical building in Timișoara, Romania. The third floor of the building today hosts the local radio station West City Radio on the frequency 88.8 FM.

== History ==
Before the beginning of the 20th century, the site of the current building housed one of the oldest churches in Timișoara. Constructed by the Franciscan Order between 1733 and 1736 in the Baroque style, the church was demolished in 1911. This was primarily due to structural damage, but also because it obstructed the construction of a new boulevard that was planned.

In place of the church, the city's chief architect, László Székely, designed a three-story palace in the style of the 1900s, inspired by the Hungarian Secession movement. The ground floor was intended as the headquarters of the Hungarian General Credit Bank (Hungarian: Magyar Általános Hitelbank), established in 1867, and the upper floors functioned as rental apartments.

After nationalization, around 1950, the ground floor housed the Gostat grocery store (a Soviet-style abbreviation for the so-called state-owned enterprises). After the privatizations after 1990, the Diverta bookstore appeared in the same place, and today its place has been taken by a café.

== Architecture ==
The building is notable for its intricately adorned corner tower, the dynamic shape of its large roof and gables, as well as its elaborate decorations, including the small hearts that embellish the balcony's ironwork. The grand entrance on the southern side of the building is framed by two fluted columns, adding a touch of classicism. On the first floor, directly across from the entrance, two bas-reliefs stand out, representing industrial and agricultural labor through human figures holding relevant tools. The universal symbols of labor—such as the hammer, gear wheel, ears of wheat, and beehive—are depicted. Overall, the palace pays homage to the historicist style, incorporating subtle Secessionist elements that are much more restrained compared to other works by Székely.
