= Trnovac, Lika-Senj County =

Trnovac
- Village
- Interactive map of Trnovac
- Location within Croatia
- Coordinates: 44.52751°N 15.27558°E
- Country: Croatia
- Region: Lika
- County: Lika-Senj
- Municipality: Gospić

Area
  - Total: 10.95 sq mi (28.37 km^{2})

Population (2021)
  - Total: 36
  - Density: 3.3/sq mi (1.3/km^{2})
- Time zone: UTC+1 (CET)
  - Summer (DST): UTC+2 (CEST)

Trnovac is a village in the City of Gospić, Croatia. It is connected by the D25 road.
