= Liberty Square, Timișoara =

Square in Timișoara

Liberty Square
- City square
- {{{other_names}}}
- Piața Libertății
- Former name: Parade Square • Prince Eugene Square
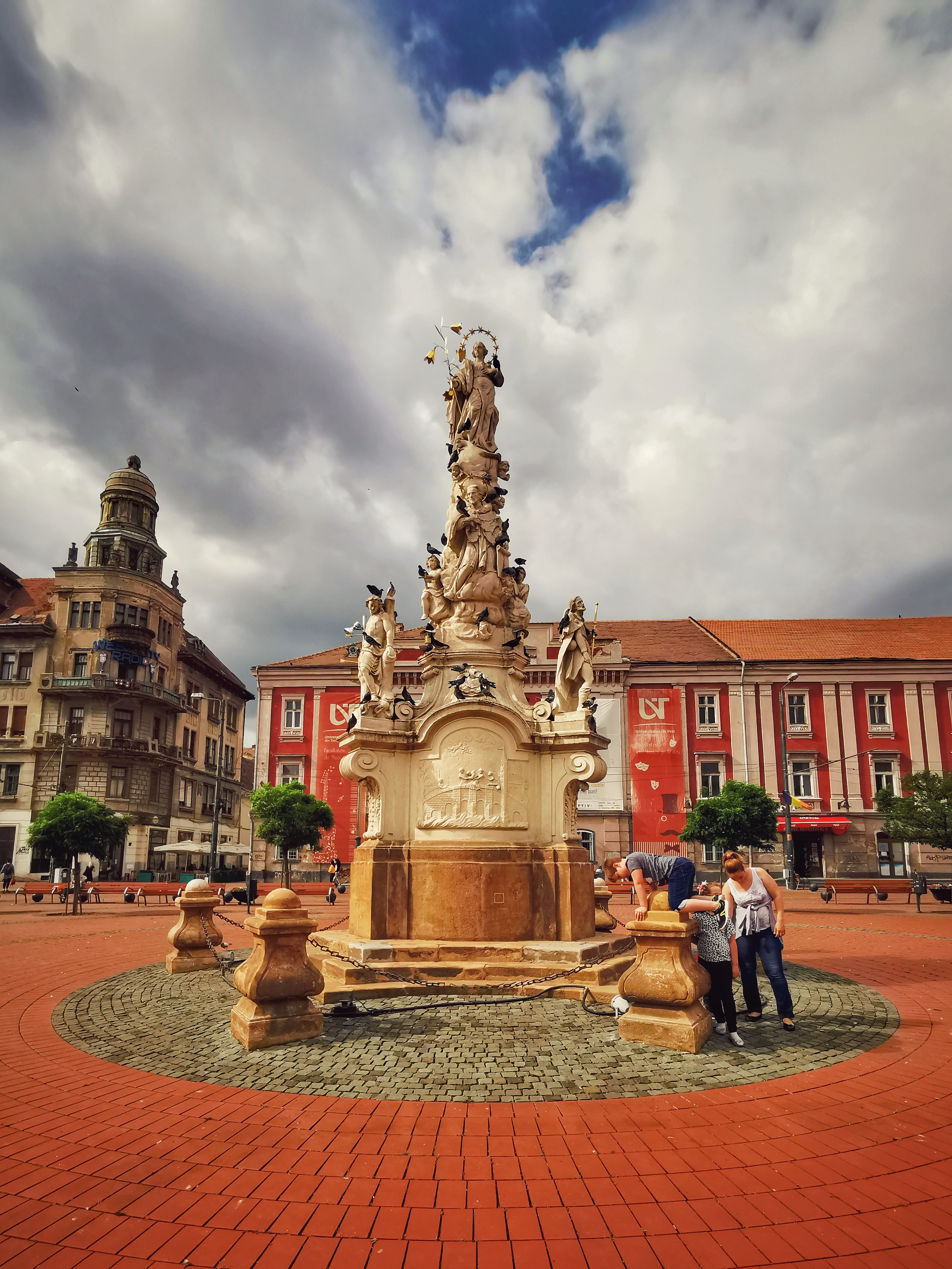
- St. Mary and St. John of Nepomuk Monument in Liberty Square
- Length: 295.8 m
- Dedicated to: Hungarian revolution and liberation war of 1848–1849
- Location: Cetate, Timișoara
- Interactive map of Liberty Square
- Coordinates: 45°45′20.35″N 21°13′38.28″E

Liberty Square (Romanian: Piața Libertății), (Note: Hungarian: Szabadság tér; German: Freiheitsplatz; Serbian: Трг слободе, romanized: Trg slobode) formerly known as Parade Square (Romanian: Piața de Paradă) or Prince Eugene Square (Romanian: Piața Prințul Eugen), is an urban square in Timișoara. It is the second-oldest square of the former fortress of Timișoara. It got its current name during the Hungarian Revolution of 1848–1849 when Timișoara withstood a siege by Hungarian revolutionaries. Liberty Square houses some of the oldest buildings in Timișoara: the Garrison Command, the former Chancellery of War, the Old City Hall and the Military Casino.

== Names ==
In the early 1700s it was called Paradeplatz and served as a training ground for imperial recruits, as well as a venue for military music concerts. An alternatively common but unofficial name in the Austrian period was Stadthausplatz. In the early 1800s it was known as Prince Eugene Square, after Eugene of Savoy, the field marshal who liberated Timișoara from Ottoman occupation in 1716. It was renamed Liberty Square in 1848, with the outbreak of the Hungarian Revolution, but after the Austrian army recaptured the city, the square returned to the name of Prince Eugene Square. The current name has been in use since 1921.

== History ==
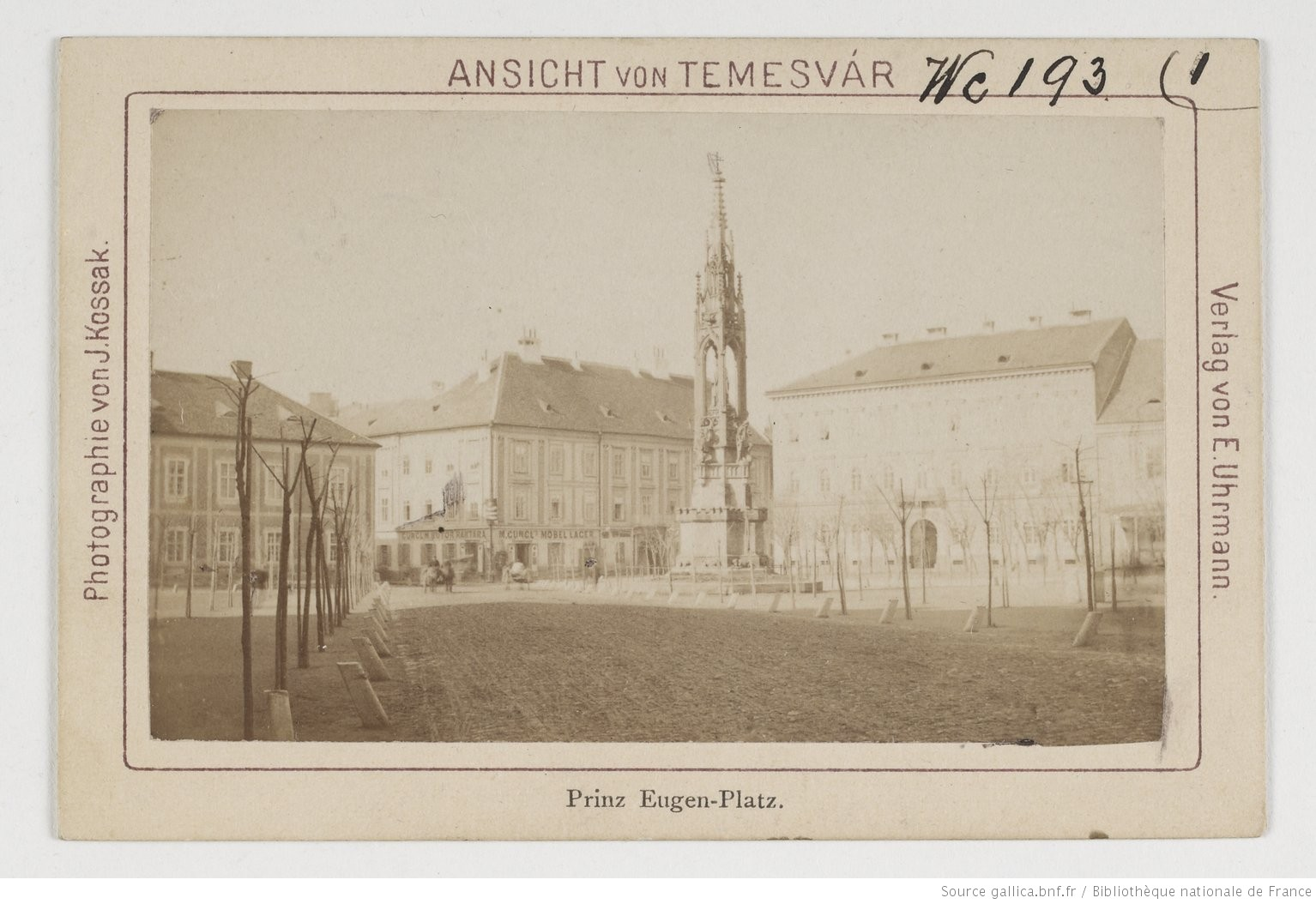
Prince Eugene Square (now Liberty Square) around 1880. Depicted here is the Fidelity Column, which now stands in the Heroes' Cemetery.

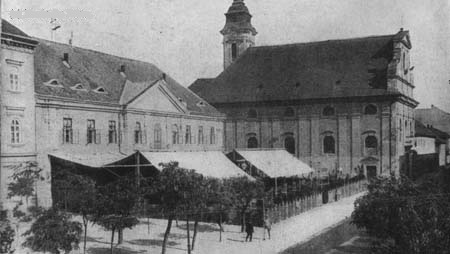
Liberty Square in 1911. The Franciscan Church depicted here was demolished two years later.

On its current location, in the Middle Ages there was a free space of triangular shape, a crossroads for three trade routes from the north, northeast and south, around which the first settlement of Timișoara was identified. Until 1716, on the eastern side of the square, there was the Big Bath, the largest public bath in the city. Mentioned by Turkish traveler Evliya Çelebi, the bath was built immediately after the conquest of the city by the Ottomans. The current square appeared as a result of the complete reconstruction of the city on a new, rectangular street plot, designed in the second decade of the 18th century.

In 1727, the space on which the Garrison building was erected in 1731 was cleared of the ruins of the former Turkish bazaar. The Old City Hall and the Church of the Bosnian Franciscans were built on the northern side of the square in 1731–1734 and 1733–1736, respectively. The church was demolished in 1913, during some modernization works, and a bank office was erected in its place. In 1740 the square was designed to occupy only the surface of a rectangular quarter. Then it was decided to widen the square to the west, so as to reach the current dimensions of 103 × 99 m. On the western side, in 1746–1747, the former Silahdar Mosque was still standing; it was later demolished.

Until after 1850, on the western front of the square, in continuation of the current Military Casino, nothing was built yet. The current building, originally called the Army Corps Command, appeared only on the city plan from 1859. Only then did Liberty Square become a closed urban space on all four sides with buildings. Until 1903, the food market, the animal market, as well as the weekly market of the city functioned here. In 1903, the commercial market was moved to the current Union Square. Also at that time, it was decided to remove the natural stone pavers and arrange some lawn surfaces and plant some trees.

In 2015, Liberty Square was completely transformed within a rehabilitation project of the Cetate district, being paved with red brick in concentric circles.

== Architecture ==
The Military Casino still retains features of the original facade; it was built in Baroque style with Rococo influences. The other buildings surrounding the square belong to the classicist style, specific to the 1900s.
