= Siege of Temesvár (1849) =

Siege of Temesvár (Timișoara)
- Part of the Hungarian Revolution of 1848
Date	11 June – 9 August 1849
Location	Temesvár, Kingdom of Hungary (today: Timișoara, Romania) 45°45′35″N 21°13′48″E
Result	Austrian victory

Belligerents
Hungary	Austrian Empire; Transylvanian Romanians

Commanders and leaders
Károly Vécsey	Juraj Rukavina Vidovgradski

Strength
12,000 men c. 100 cannon	9,000 men 213 cannon
- Location within Romania Siege of Temesvár (1849) (Hungary)

The siege of Temesvár (today: Timișoara, Romania) was a siege during the Hungarian Revolution of 1848 between the Austrian Empire and Hungarian Revolutionary Army. The Hungarians unsuccessfully tried to capture the Timișoara Fortress.

The siege ended with the Battle of Temesvár.

== Sources ==
- Temesvár története
- Dr. Csikány Tamás: Várharcok az 1848/49-es magyar szabadságharcban
- Temesvár az erdélyi közérdekű adatbázisban
