= Alairac =

Commune in Occitanie, France

- Commune
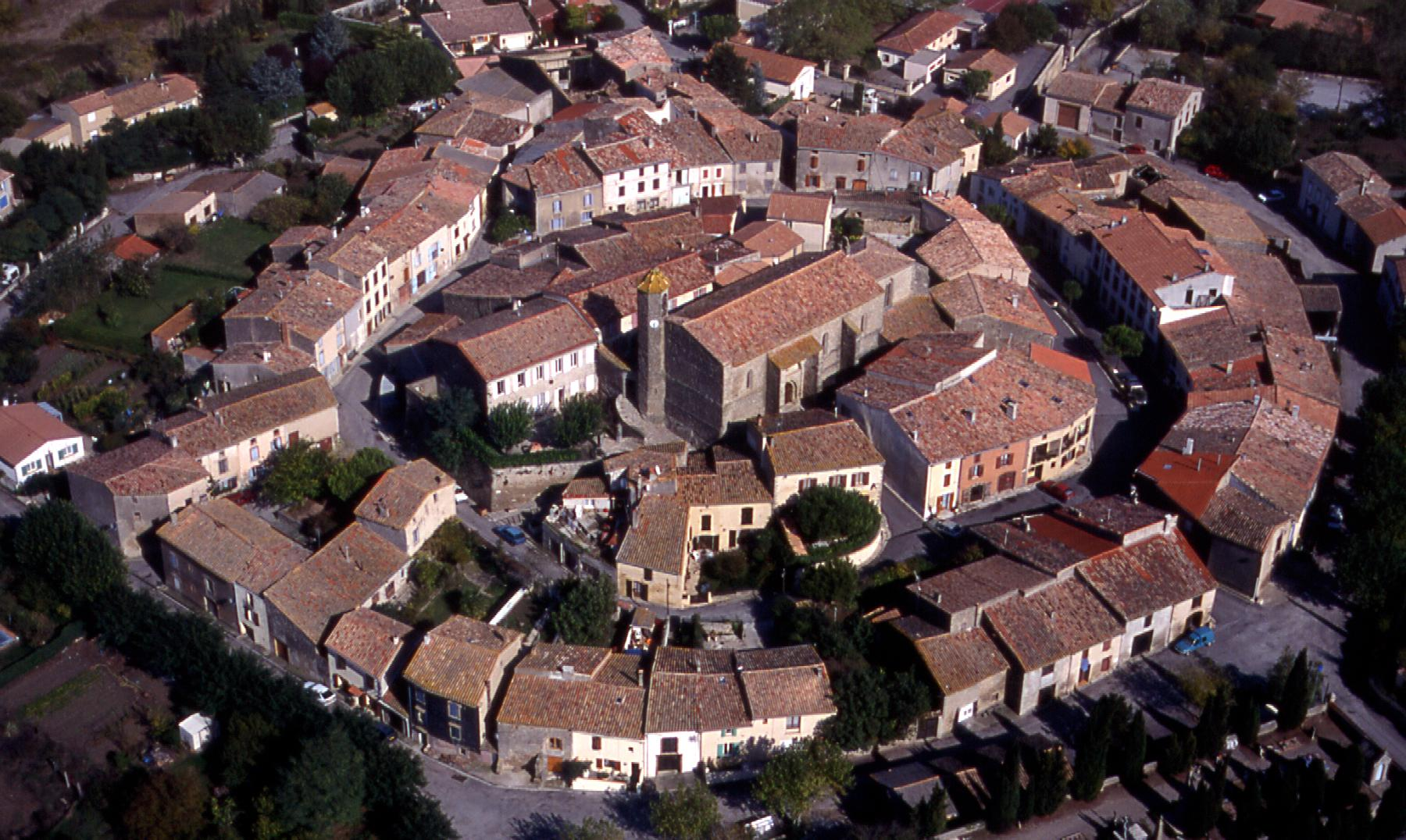
- An aerial view of Alairac

- Coat of arms
- Location of Alairac
- Location within France Location within Occitanie
- Coordinates: 43°11′06″N 2°14′29″E
- Country: France
- Region: Occitania
- Department: Aude
- Arrondissement: Carcassonne
- Canton: Carcassonne-3
- Intercommunality: Carcassonne Agglo

Government
  - Mayor (2020–2026): Marc Adivèze
- Area^{1}: 16.37 km^{2} (6.32 sq mi)
- Elevation: 190 m (620 ft)
- Highest elevation: 422 m (1,385 ft)
- Lowest elevation: 158 m (518 ft)
- Population (2023): 1,395
  - Density: 85.22/km^{2} (220.7/sq mi)
- Time zone: UTC+01:00 (CET)
  - Summer (DST): UTC+02:00 (CEST)
- INSEE/Postal code: 11005 /11290
- ^{1} French Land Register data, which excludes lakes, ponds, glaciers > 1 km^{2} (0.386 sq mi or 247 acres) and river estuaries.

Alairac (French pronunciation: [alɛʁak]) is a commune in the Aude department in the Occitanie region of southern France.

== Geography ==
The commune is in the urban area of Carcassonne and is located on a hillock at the foot of the Malepère mountain range. Alairac is a traditional circulade village dating to 1000AD. The commune has been part of the agglomeration community called Carcassonne Agglo since 1 January 2010.

The commune is located some 80 km south-east of Toulouse and only 6 km south-west of Carcassonne. The Motorway E80 (A61) passes across the northern tip of the commune but has no exit. The commune can be reached by Road D18 from Carcassonne, which passes in a south-westerly direction through the heart of the commune towards Cailhau. Road D211 also passes through the commune from Arzens in the west to Lavalette in the east passing to the north of Alairac village. The village can be reached by a number of local roads from both the D211 and the D18. The commune is both farmland and forest with two small hamlets: Galet and Les Rougeats.

Several streams pass through the commune. In the east the Ruisseau Saint Pierre forms the eastern border of the commune, the Ruisseau de Bonne Mere forms the southern boundary, and the Ruisseau du Sout forms the western boundary. Inside the commune there are several streams with the Ruisseau de Celule Ou Gautel passing near the village. All the streams eventually flow into the river Aude which continues east into the Mediterranean Sea.

=== Geology, topography and hydrography ===
The village overlooks the plain where the Canal du Midi to the north of the commune towards Carcassonne and the view extends over a panorama limited to the north by the Montagne Noire (Black Mountain). To the north-east is the city of Carcassonne and to the south the Malepère mountain range covered in oak forest, the domain of wild boar and mushroom collectors.

=== Climate ===
The village has an oceanic climate with a strong Mediterranean influence. This area is dominated by holly oak forests which makes it suitable for the cultivation of the grapevines. The summers are temperate and the winters mild.

== History ==
The first written record of the castle appeared in 1063: the time of the probable construction of the circulade. The area belonged to the Count of Foix, the first of which was Roger I de Foix who was the second son of Bernard-Roger, Count of Bigorre. Over the years, he exchanged the County of Foix with the Viscount of Carcassonne several times to the Trencavel family.

From the 11th century, the village was traversed by one of the paths to Saint Jacques de Compostela called "Path of the Pyrenean Piedmont". This pilgrimage continued until the 18th century.

During the Albigensian Crusade at Easter 1210, Simon de Montfort besieged the castle at Alairac for eleven days at which the people, fearing they may have to surrender, fled by night. In 1309, the last known Cathar perfect, Guillaume Bélibaste, fled Catalonia with Philippe of Alayrac. The latter, on his return home after ten years of exile, was probably captured and burned.

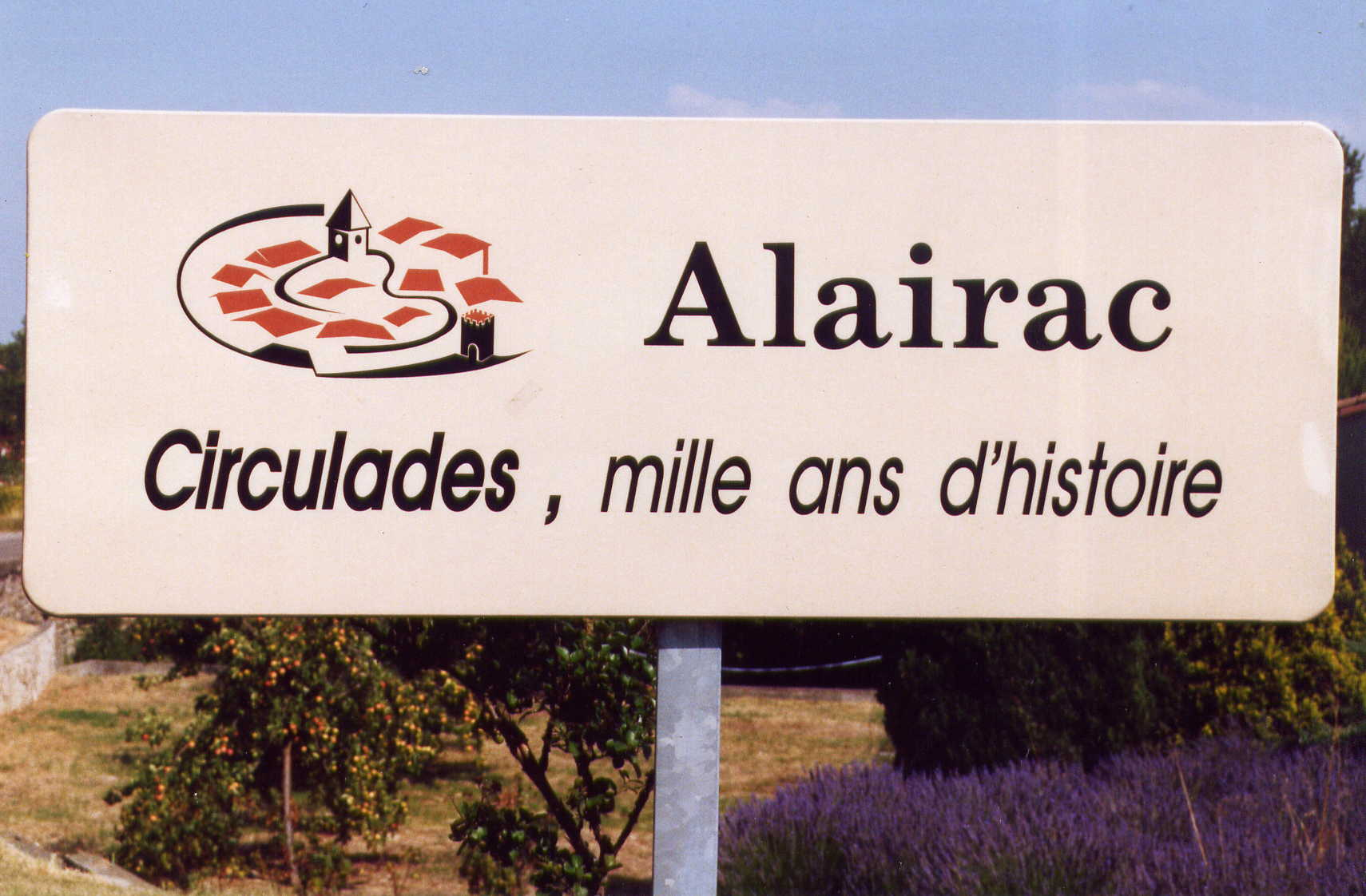
Sign at the entrance of the village

On hearing the sound of an approaching large company from Routiers in 1366, the officers of the Bailiwick of Carcassonne ordered the inhabitants of the castle at Alairac — which belonged to Jean d'Armagnac — to fortify it and destroy the surrounding area. Having failed to execute the order, the Viscount angrily set fire to the castle which was completely burned. Later, the Count of Armagnac ceded the land of Alairac to the Marquis of Mirepoix in 1404.

The lordship was sold at the beginning of the 18th century to a citizen of Carcassonne. This lordship was extinguished by the Revolution in 1789.

During the First World War from 1914 to 1918, the village lost nineteen people, whose names are inscribed on the memorial. Every year on 11 November, this sacrifice is remembered by reading their names during a ceremony attended by schoolchildren.

During the Algerian War, many young people from Alairac were called to fight. One of them was killed. Every 19 March the laying of wreaths takes place to commemorate the date the Évian Accords came into force.

=== Heraldry ===
Arms of Alairac	Or means a gold background, pale, in heraldry is a vertical band in the middle of the shield and bounded by two lines, tapering: indicates the tapering of the pale, Vert: means the colour green Blazon: Or, a pale tapering of Vert.

== Administration ==
List of Successive Mayors of Alairac

From	To	Name	Party
1862	1871	Louis Guilhem	
1871	1871	Guilhem benoit	
1871	1900	Jean Fages	
1900	1919	Guilhem Achilles	
1919	1929	Fages Irenaeus	
1929	1935	Gaston Vidal	
1935	1945	Fages Irenaeus	
1945	1952	Urban Marcerou	
1952	1953	André Mouls	
1953	1971	Carrie Antonin	
1971	2020	Roger Adivèze	PS
2020	2026	Marc Adivèze	

== Population ==
The inhabitants of the commune are known as Alairacois, or Alairacoises in French.

Historical population
Year	Pop.	±% p.a.
1968	357	—
1975	359	+0.08%
1982	537	+5.92%
1990	618	+1.77%
1999	708	+1.52%
2007	1,193	+6.74%
2012	1,305	+1.81%
2017	1,330	+0.38%
2023	1,395	+0.80%
Source: INSEE

== Economy ==
Viticulture: Malepère (AOC)

== Culture and heritage ==
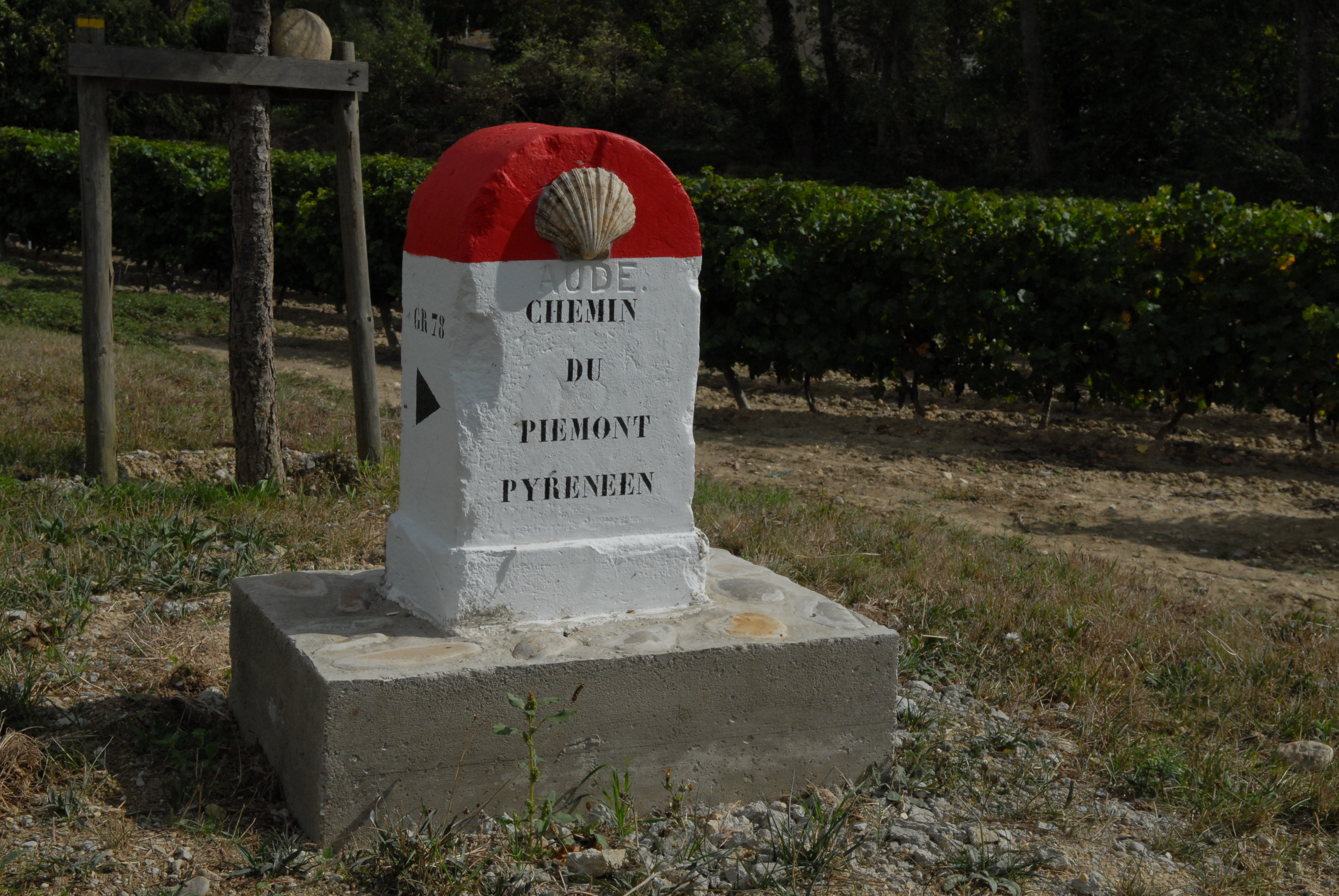
A milestone on the Way of Saint James

== Civil heritage ==
- The Circulade of Alairac with its circular boulevard called Rond Saint-Germain: the heart of the village
- The War memorial surmounted by a Gallic rooster on which is inscribed the names of the twenty young men of the village who were killed during the wars of the 20th century
- A Courtyard shaded by acacias at the primary school dating from 1935
- The village is crossed by one of the roads of the Way of Saint James leading to Saint-Jacques de Compostela

=== Religious heritage ===
The commune has several religious buildings and structures that are registered as historical monuments:

- The Parish Church of Saint Germain (14th century) with an octagonal bell tower which originally served as a Fortified tower. The Church contains two items that are registered as historical objects:
  - A Chalice with Paten (19th century)
  - A Chalice with Paten (19th century)
- The Catuffe Cross (1645) on the Chamin des Castelles.
- The Alairac Cross (17th century), a Saint Germain style round cross.

=== Gallery ===
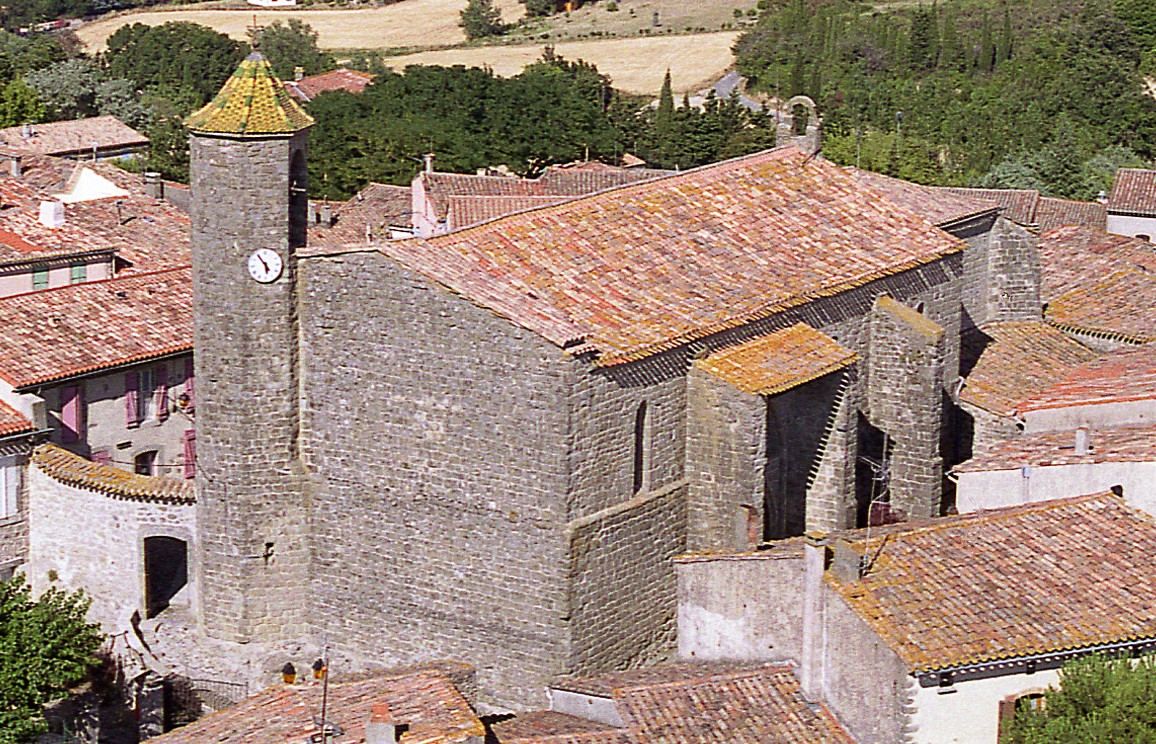
Church of Saint-Germain d'Alairac

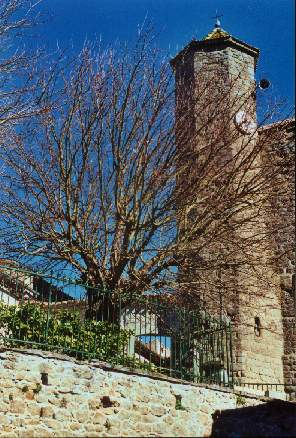
Octagonal Bell Tower from the 13th century

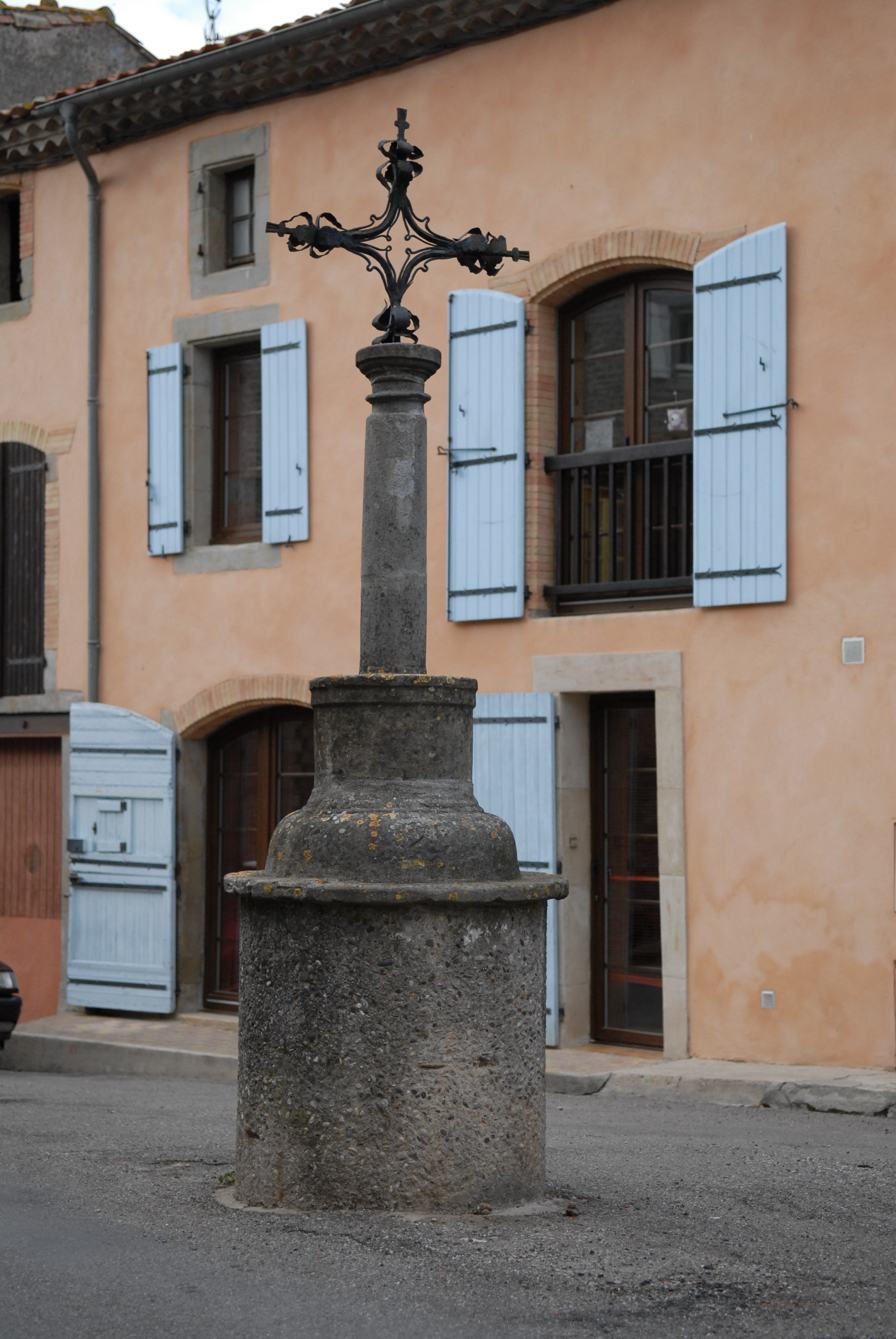
Saint-Germain round cross

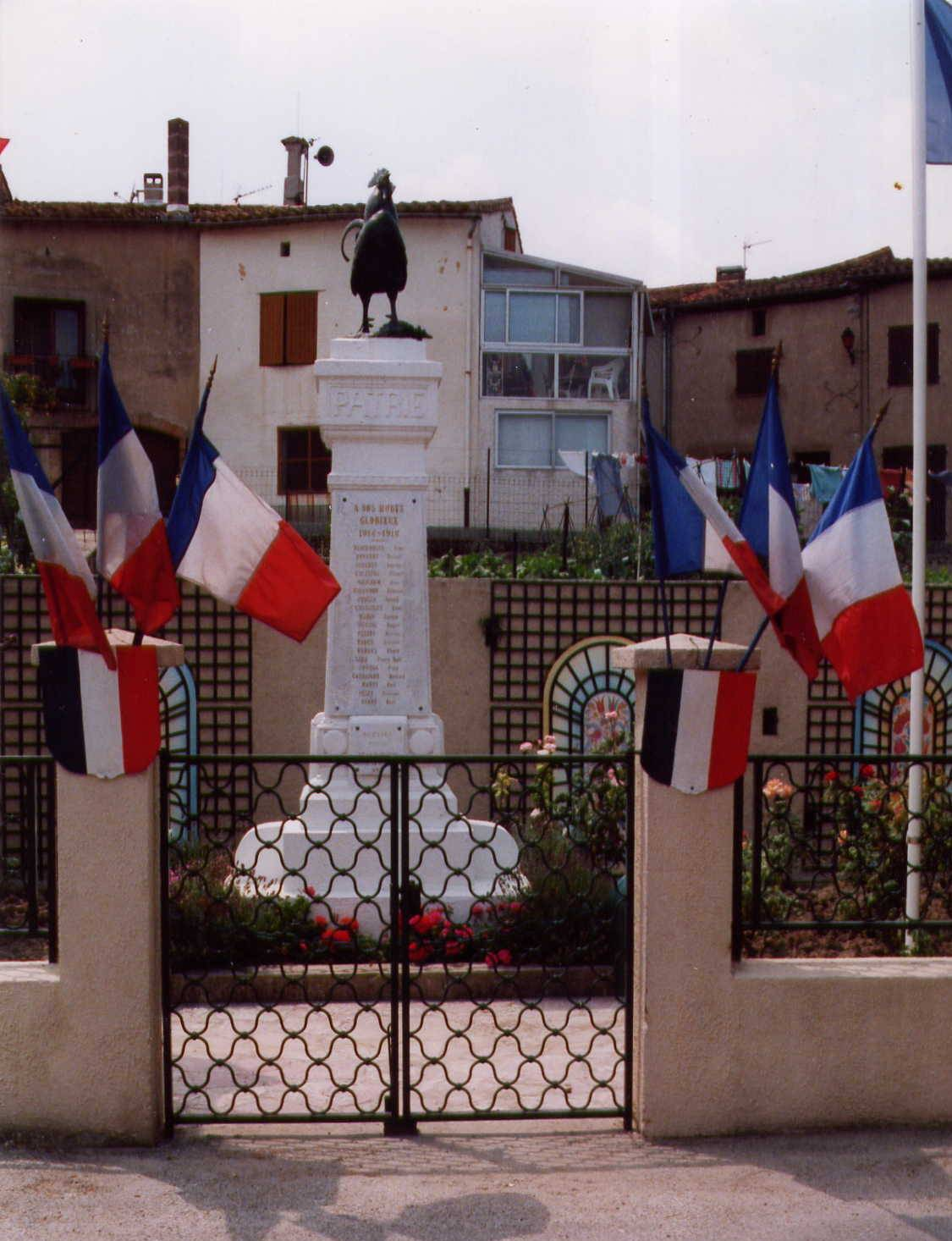
Twenty names engraved on the War memorial

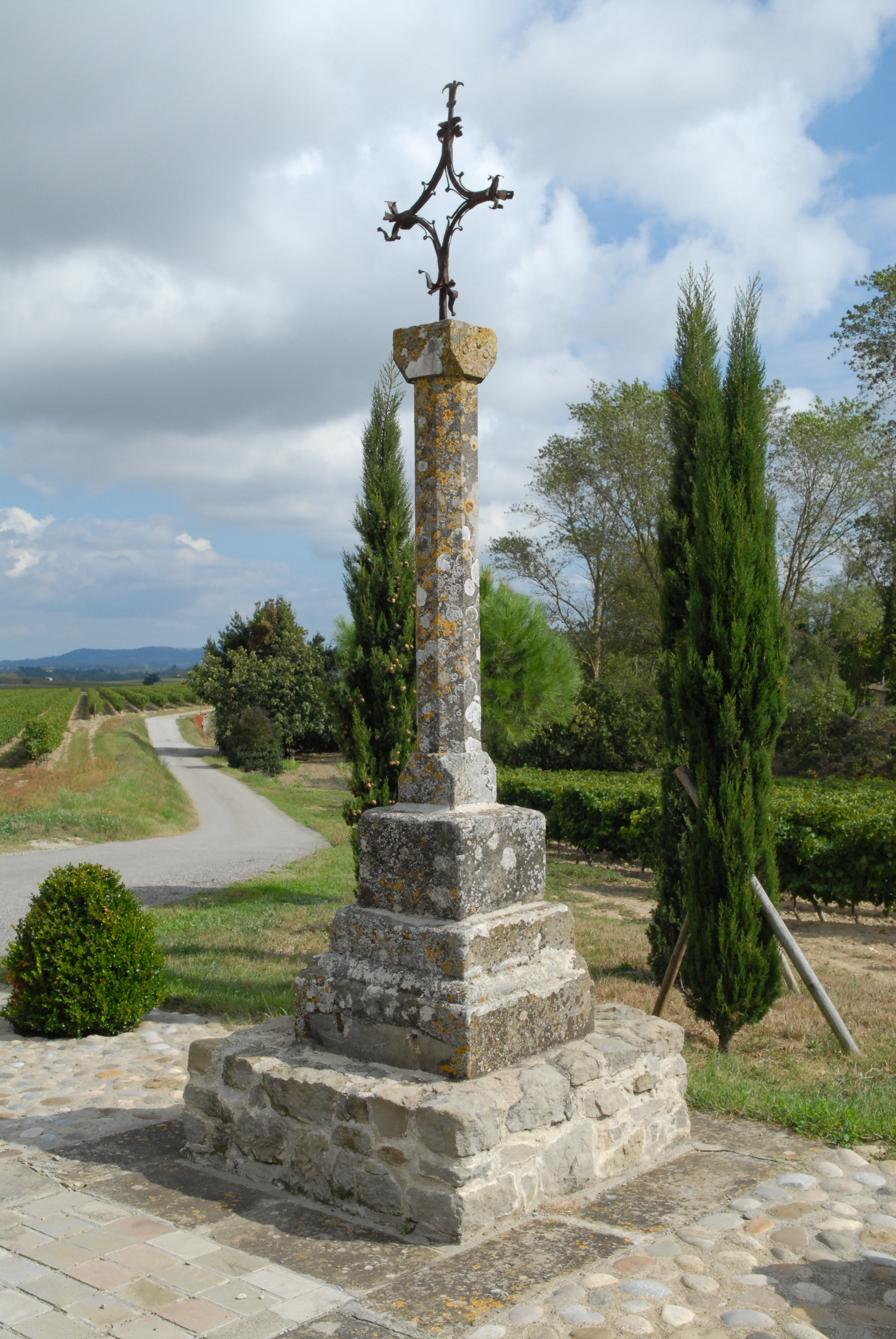
The Cross of Catufe from the 17th century

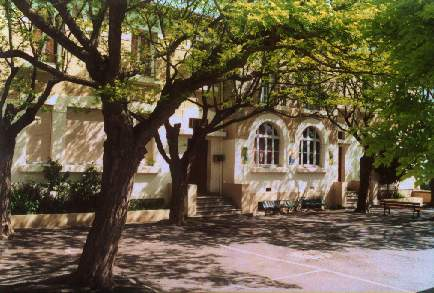
The courtyard of the primary school

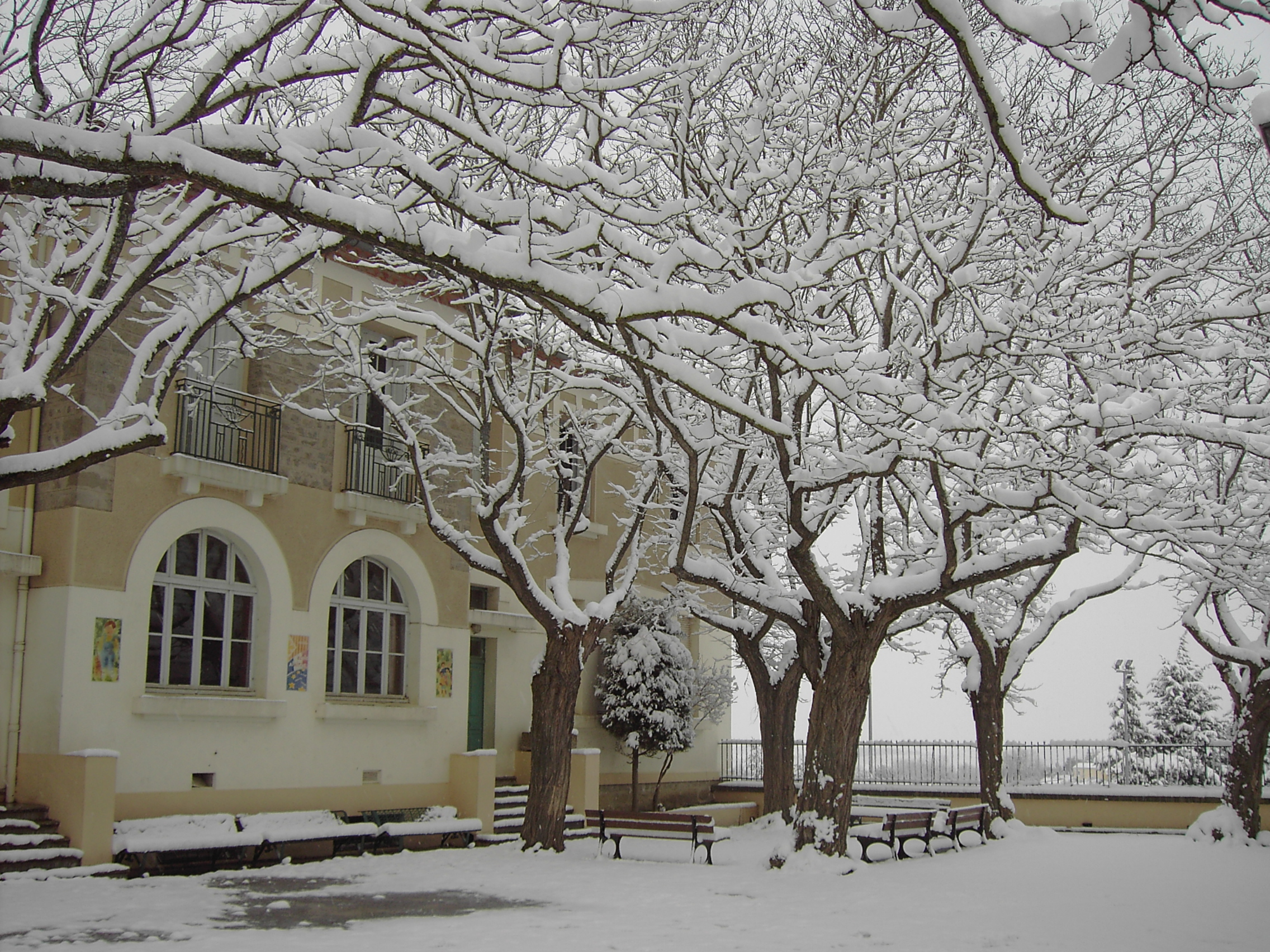
Snow on the primary school courtyard

=== Culture and festivals ===
- The Alain Cazalis Library is associated with the library of the Aude
- In March there is Printemps de notes (Spring notes), an artistic and musical festival of Alairac in Malepère
- In May De circulade en circulade is hosted, comprising plays, lectures, and local bands together with fourteen other circulade villages of Aude.
- On the first Sunday of June there is a hunting feast with a Mass for Saint Hubert to bless the packs of dogs
- In the last weekend of July there is the village fete

=== Children's activities ===
There is a hall for teenagers (12–17 years old) organised by the CIAS of Carcassonne. This activity is supervised by Mathieu Bruno the organiser.

== Facilities ==
=== Education ===
- In total one hundred and fifty children were enrolled in the Alairac public school in 2012 which has both a primary school built in 1935 and a kindergarten which was built in 2002
- From eleven years old most of the children go to the Varsovie College at Carcassonne.

=== Sports ===
- Football club of the Malepère in association with Lavalette and Roullens
- Tennis accord between the Malepère and Alairac, Caux-et-Sauzens, Preixan, Arzens, and Lavalette.
- Cycling Club
- Motorcycle club, with the Escande track and the motocross international circuit at Escande

== Notable people linked to the commune ==
- Philippe of Alayrac, companion of the last Cathar Perfect, Guillaume Bélibaste
- André Mouls, playwright and Occitan poet
- Alain Cazalis (1950–2012), Deputy Mayor, Deputy for Culture, defender of "rural culture", including the creator of the Spring notes festival and initiator of the association De circulade en circulade
- Roger Adivèze former regional councilor, officer of the Legion of Honour, mayor between 1971 and 2020 and vice president of the Carcassonne Agglo since January 2010, and also chairman of the management centre of the territorial public service of Aude.

== See also ==
- Communes of the Aude department

=== External links ===
- Alairac official website (in French)
- Alairac page on the circulades website
- Alairac on Géoportail, National Geographic Institute (IGN) website (in French)
- Alairac on the 1750 Cassini Map
