= Jean-Jacques Causse =

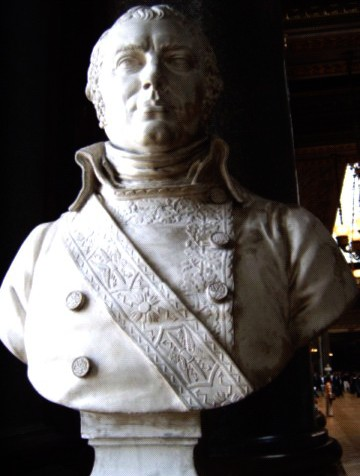
- Bust of Jean-Jacques Causse in Galerie des Batailles
- Born: 29 August 1751; Caux, Hérault, France
- Died: 15 April 1796 (aged 44) Dego, Italy
- Allegiance: France
- Branch: Infantry
- Service years: 1770–1796
- Rank: General of Brigade
- Conflicts: War of the Pyrenees; Siege of Collioure; Siege of Roses; War of the First Coalition; Battle of Montenotte; Second Battle of Dego

Jean-Jacques Causse (French pronunciation: [ʒɑ̃ ʒak kos]; 29 August 1751 – 15 April 1796) was killed in action at the Second Battle of Dego while commanding a French Republican infantry brigade. He joined the French Royal Army and after serving in the ranks for 22 years, gained promotion to officer during the French Revolution. While fighting in the War of the Pyrenees Causse enjoyed rapid advancement, emerging as a general of brigade in December 1793. He transferred to the Army of Italy in February 1795. CAUSSE is one of the names inscribed under the Arc de Triomphe, on Column 30.

== War of the Pyrenees ==
Causse was born on 29 August 1751. He joined the Bourbonnais Regiment of the French Royal Army in 1770. In 1792 he became a sous lieutenant and later transferred to the Army of the Eastern Pyrenees. He became an Adjutant General chef de brigade (colonel) on 4 October 1793 and general of brigade on 25 December 1793.

After their triumph in the Battle of Boulou on 30 April-1 May 1794, the French Army of the Eastern Pyrenees invested the port of Collioure. After a siege lasting from 2 to 26 May, General Eugenio Navarro's Spanish garrison capitulated. Spanish losses were 160 killed and wounded, 22 colors, 91 artillery pieces, and 7,000 prisoners who were paroled after agreeing not to fight against France until exchanged. The French émigrés escaped in fishing boats. The siege was conducted by André la Barre's cavalry division and Pierre Francois Sauret's infantry division including the brigades of Causse, Jean-François Micas, Louis Pelletier, Jean Simon Pierre Pinon, and Claude Perrin Victor. French losses were 150 killed and wounded.

The French won a significant victory in the Battle of the Black Mountain on 17–20 December 1794. In the aftermath, Sauret conducted the Siege of Roses beginning on 21 November. Sauret's division included brigades under Causse (1,403 men), Victor (2,455 men), Joseph Magdelaine Martin (1,747 men), Robert Motte (1,799 men), Théodore Chabert (2,118 men), and François Gilles Guillot (1,142 men). The 2,797-strong division of Jean Baptiste Beaufort de Thorigny was in support. On 3 February 1795, the surviving members of the 4,000-man Spanish garrison evacuated by sea. Spanish losses were 113 killed, 470 wounded, 1,160 sick plus 300 captured.

== Italian campaign ==
The Death of General Causse at the Battle of Dego by François Mulard, 1812

The Second Battle of Dego was fought on 14 and 15 April 1796. On the 13th around 2:00 PM, André Masséna probed the Austrian and Piedmontese positions which were fortified and supported by 18 pieces of artillery. The next day at 11:00 AM, Masséna began moving Jean-Baptiste Meynier's division forward in two columns to attack the 3,000 defenders. On the right, Jean Jacques La Salcette had 1,800 troops including the 17th Light Infantry Demi-Brigade. In the center, Masséna took personal control of 2,600 men of the 14th and 32nd Line Infantry. On the left, Amédée Emmanuel Francois Laharpe took his division to the west bank of the Bormida di Spigno and unlimbered six guns to support the attack. When La Salcette's flanking column began to threaten the Austrian left flank about 3:00 PM, Masséna waved his men forward to attack Dego from the south. Laharpe formed his division into three columns and sent his men across the river north of Dego to attack the Austro-Piedmontese right flank. Causse led two battalions of the 51st Line Infantry on the right flank, Jean-Baptiste Cervoni led one battalion of the 75th Line Infantry in the center while another battalion of the 75th advanced on the left. Henri Christian Michel de Stengel covered the left flank with two regiments of cavalry. The French attack relentlessly forced the defenders into retreat. When the Austrian wing commander Eugene-Guillaume Argenteau belatedly showed up with two battalions of reinforcements, the French simply brushed him aside. In all, the French captured 16 guns, four colors, and as many as 1,500 prisoners.

That evening the hungry French soldiers went completely beyond the control of their officers and dispersed in search of food and plunder. Meanwhile, Laharpe's division was ordered away on another mission. It rained all night and at 7:00 AM on 15 April an Austrian brigade under Josef Philipp Vukassovich attacked Dego. After battling for three hours, some key officers were hit and the French position unraveled. By 11:00 PM, Vukassovich was in full possession of Dego and several hundred French prisoners. Masséna rallied his routed troops while orders of recall went to Laharpe. When Laharpe's grumbling soldiers returned, the French had to attack Dego in a replay of the previous day's action. Under his command, Laharpe had the 51st Line under Causse and the 4th Light and 18th Line under Victor. Causse's attack immediately ran into trouble and he was fatally hit. The 51st Line was driven back and their chef de brigade was captured but later escaped. Ultimately, the French advantage of numbers compelled Vukassovich to retreat.

Causse died on 15 April 1796. A bust of the slain general stands in the Galerie des Batailles at the Palace of Versailles.
