= Second Battle of Dego =

Battle of the Montenotte campaign

- Part of the Montenotte campaign
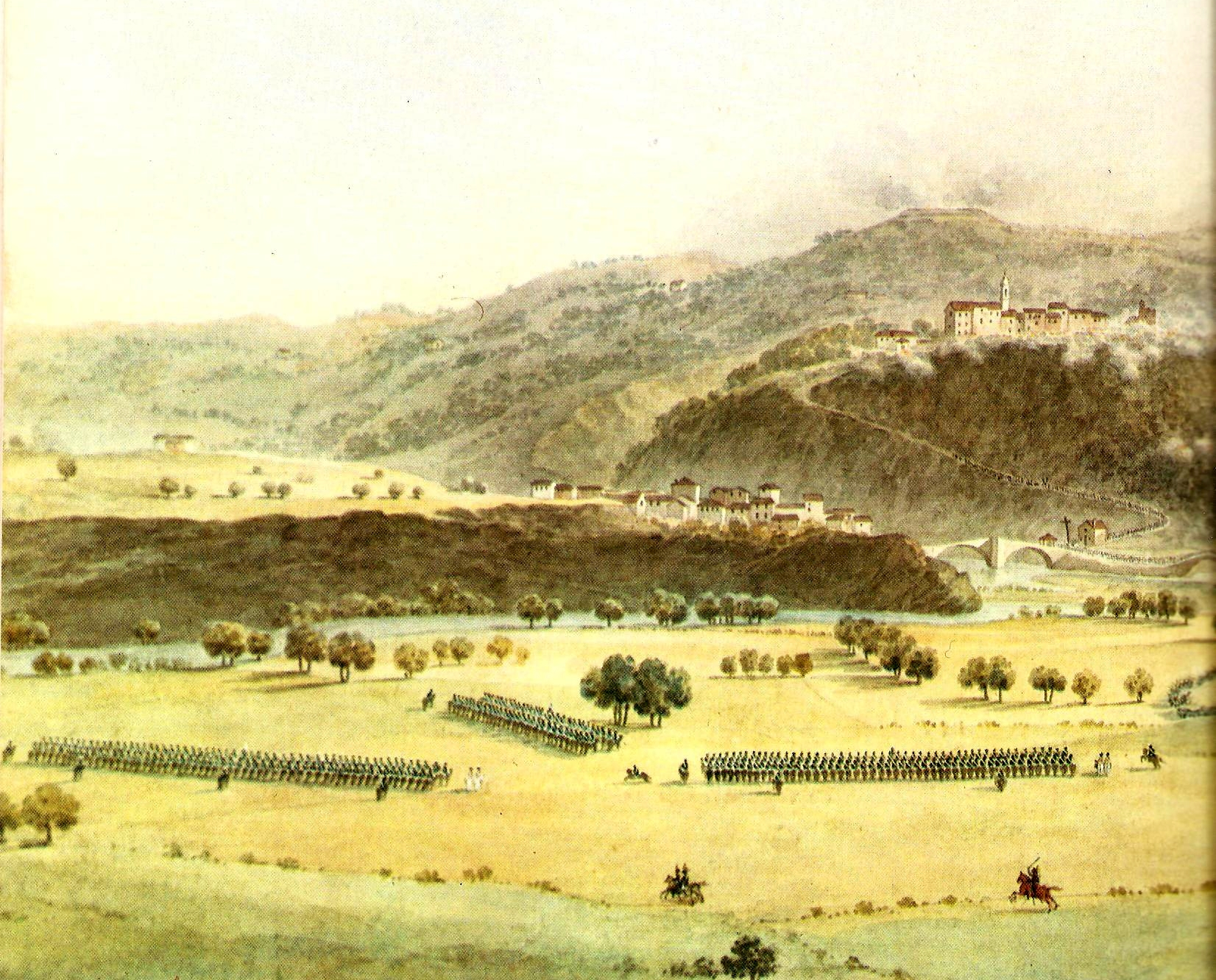
- The battle of Dego on 15 April 1796; Giuseppe Pietro Bagetti, c. 1802–1806
Date	14–15 April 1796
Location	Dego, present-day Italy 44.4500°N 8.3167°E
Result	French victory

Belligerents
(French First Republic) French Republic	Habsburg monarchy Kingdom of Sardinia

Commanders and leaders
(French First Republic) Napoleon Bonaparte; (French First Republic) Jean Lannes; (French First Republic) André Masséna	(Habsburg monarchy) Eugène Argenteau; (Habsburg monarchy) Josef Vukassovich

Strength
14 April: 12,000; 15 April: 15,000	14 April: 5,700; 15 April: 3,500

Casualties and losses
14 April: 1,500 casualties 15 April: 938 casualties	14 April: 3,000 casualties 15 April: 1,757 casualties
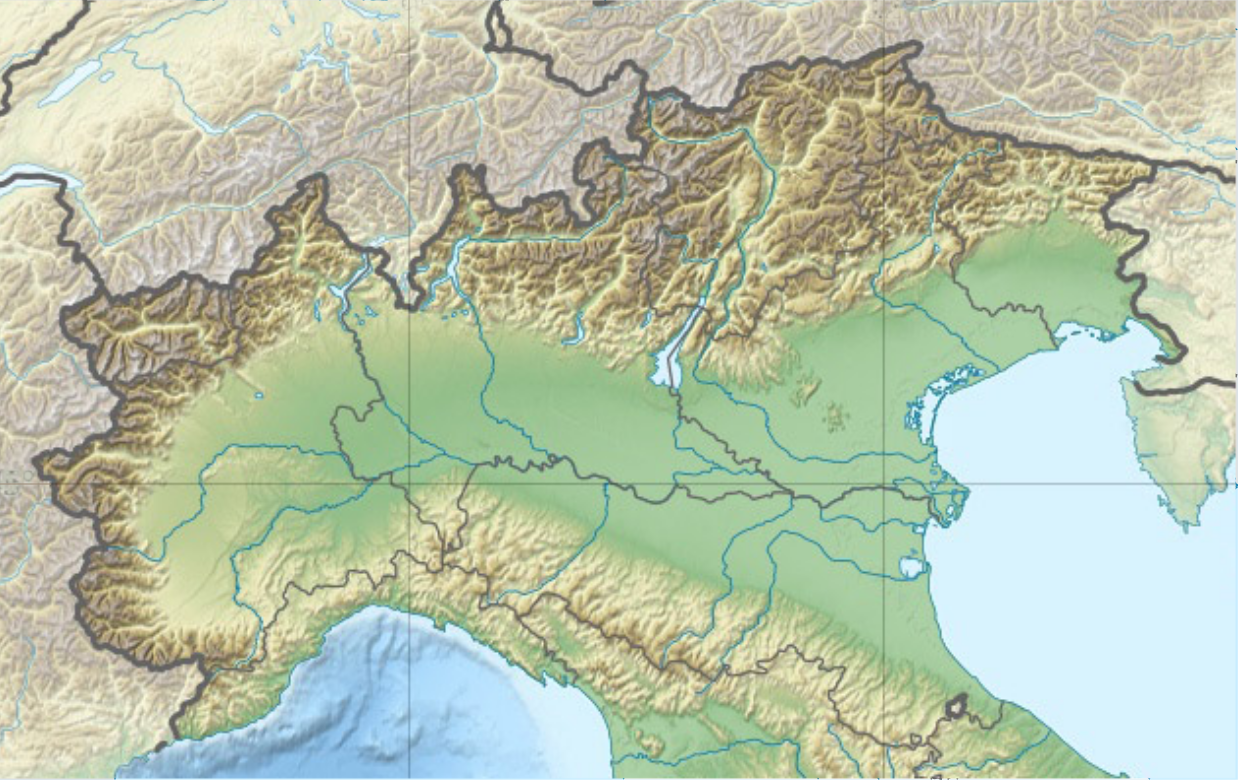
- Location within Northern Italy Second Battle of Dego (Europe)

The Second Battle of Dego was fought on 14 and 15 April 1796 during the French Revolutionary Wars between French forces and Austro-Sardinian forces. The battle was fought near Dego, a hamlet in northwestern Italy, and ended in a French victory.

== Background ==
After successfully defeating the Austrian right wing at the Battle of Montenotte, Napoleon Bonaparte continued with his plan to separate the Austrian army of General Johann Beaulieu from the army of the Kingdom of Piedmont-Sardinia led by General Michelangelo Colli. By taking the defences at Dego, the French would control the only road by which the two armies could link with each other. The town's defences comprised both a castle on a bluff and earthworks on rising ground, and were held by a small mixed force, consisting of units of both the Austrian and Piedmont-Sardinian armies.

== Forces ==
Army of Italy: Napoleon Bonaparte (15,000)

- Attached to army command:
  - Cavalry Division: Henri Stengel
    - Regiments: 5th Dragoons, 22nd Horse Chasseurs
- Corps: André Masséna
  - Division: Amédée Laharpe
    - Brigadiers: Jean Pijon, Jean Ménard, Jean Cervoni
    - Demi-brigades: 1st Light, 14th, 21st, 69th, 70th and 99th Line
  - Division: Jean Meynier
    - Brigadiers: Elzéard Dommartin, Barthélemy Joubert (not present)
    - Demi-brigades: 45th, 46th, 84th and 100th Line

Austrian Forces

- Part of Right Wing: Eugène Argenteau (5,700)
  - Austrian Regiments, 1 bn each: Stain IR # 50, Pellegrini IR # 49, Schröder IR # 26, Alvinczi # 19, Terzi IR # 16, Nádasdy IR # 39, Deutschmeister IR # 4
  - Austrian Regiments: Preiss IR # 24 (3 bns), Archduke Anton IR # 52 (2 bns)
  - Sardinian Regiments: La Marina IR (2 bns), Montferrat IR (1 bn)
- Brigade: Josef Vukassovich (3,500)
  - Regiments: Carlstadt Grenz IR (2 bns), Alvinczi IR # 19, Nádasdy IR # 39, Preiss IR # 24 (all 1 bn)

Key

- Line = Line Infantry
- Light = Light Infantry
- IR = Infantry Regiment
- bn = infantry battalion

== Battle ==
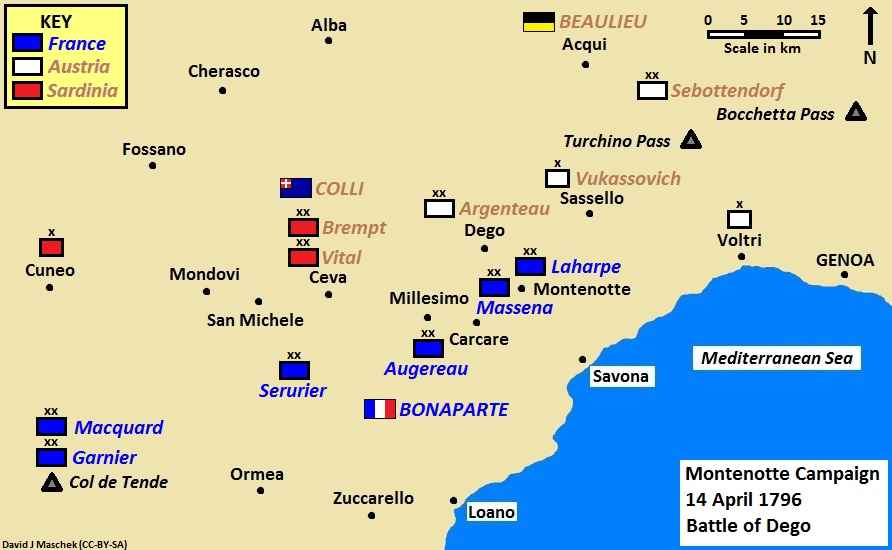

On 14 April, André Masséna, leading Amédée Laharpe's division and one brigade of Jean-Baptiste Meynier's division attacked the town. The French overran the defences, losing about 1,500 killed and wounded. The Austrians suffered 3,000 casualties, including a large number of prisoners. Argenteau's survivors fled northeast to the town of Acqui Terme. Bonaparte ordered Meynier to hold Dego, while he took Laharpe's division west to fight Colli's Sardinians.

However, the French troops in Dego then gave themselves over to looting, and during the night they were mostly scattered in the nearby houses. At dawn on 15 April, under cover of fog, the defences were counter-attacked by an Austrian force under Colonel Josef Vukassovich. Beaulieu planned for Vukassovich to reinforce Argenteau the day before, but his orders were poorly written and his subordinate showed up at Dego a day too late. Nevertheless, taken by surprise, the French were rapidly driven out of Dego and back to their starting point of the day before. Allegedly, the surprise attack caught Masséna in bed with a woman and he escaped in his nightshirt.

Masséna took some time to take control of the situation again. He recalled Laharpe and organised a counter-attack, which was supported by other reinforcements brought up by Bonaparte. Vukassovich's force was heavily outnumbered, and was unable to defend for long before it was driven out, leaving Dego definitively in French hands.

== Results ==
The Death of General Causse at the Battle of Dego by François Mulard, 1812

The second day's action cost the Austrians a further 670 killed and wounded, plus 1,087 captured. The Preiss Infantry Regiment # 24 took particularly heavy losses. The French lost 621 killed and wounded, and 317 captured. The second day surprise made Bonaparte anxious that Beaulieu might intervene from the east, so the French general reorganized his forces and sent out strong patrols on 16 April. But Argenteau's mauling at Montenotte and Dego shook Beaulieu's nerve and he stayed near Acqui. Satisfied that Beaulieu was out of the picture, Bonaparte turned on Colli with his main strength on 17 April. On 21 April, The French beat Colli at the Battle of Mondovì and soon afterward the Sardinian government sued for peace.
