= Canton of Carcassonne-3 =

Coordinates: 43.21°N 2.33°E

- Canton
- Situation of the canton of Carcassonne-3 in the department of Aude
- Country: France
- Region: Occitania
- Department: Aude
- No. of communes: {{{nbcomm}}}
- Population (2023): 21,867
- INSEE code: 1104

The canton of Carcassonne-3 is an administrative division of the Aude department, southern France. It was created at the French canton reorganisation which came into effect in March 2015. Its seat is in Carcassonne.

It consists of the following communes:

1. Alairac
2. Carcassonne (partly)
3. Lavalette
4. Montclar
5. Preixan
6. Rouffiac-d'Aude
7. Roullens
