= Caux, Hérault =

Caux
- Commune
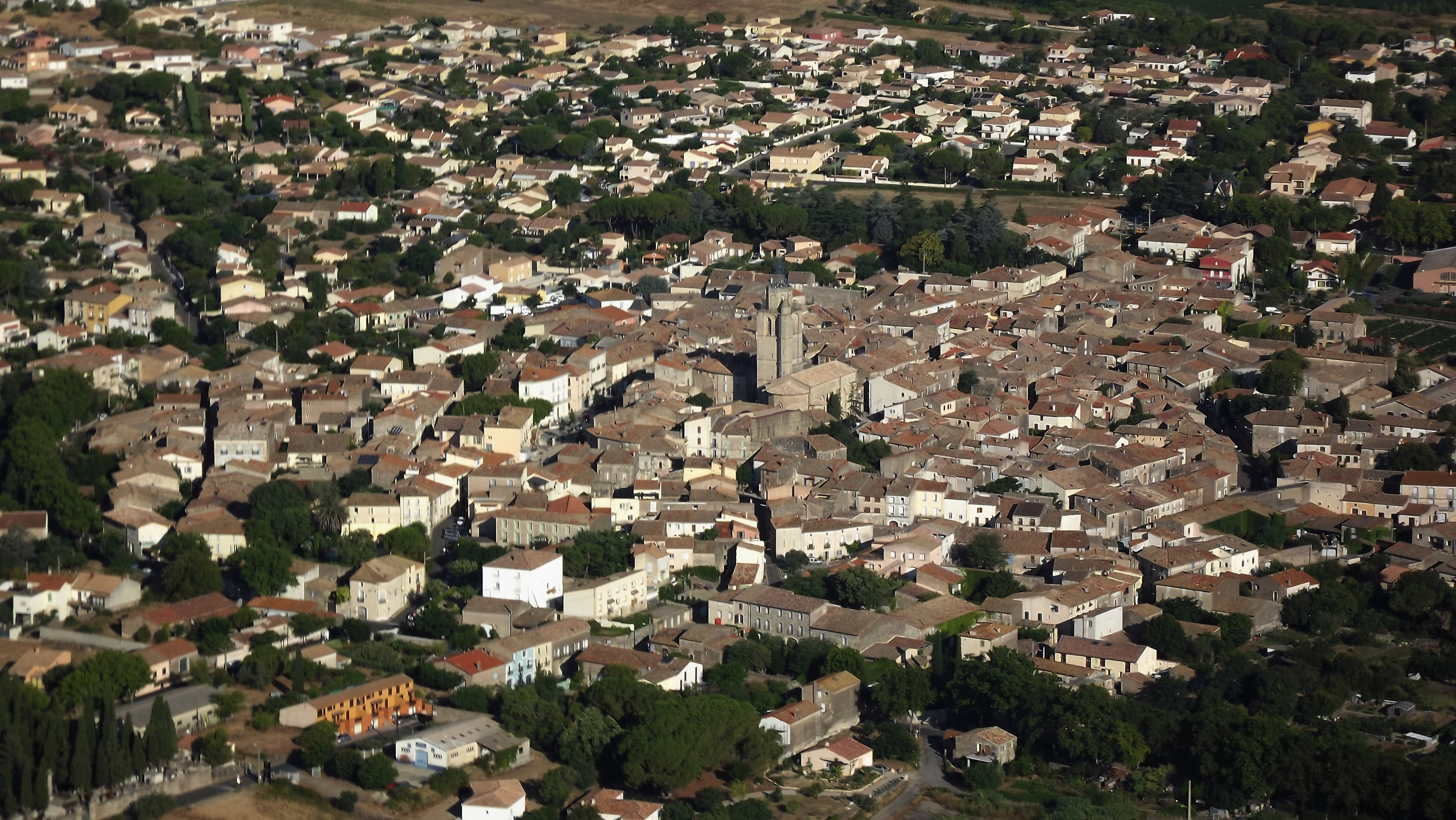
- View of Caux

- Coat of arms
- Location of Caux
- Location within France Location within Occitanie
- Coordinates: 43°30′29″N 3°22′11″E
- Country: France
- Region: Occitania
- Department: Hérault
- Arrondissement: Béziers
- Canton: Pézenas
- Intercommunality: CA Hérault Méditerranée

Government
  - Mayor (2023–2026): Jean-Charles Desplan
- Area^{1}: 24.84 km^{2} (9.59 sq mi)
- Highest elevation: 166 m (545 ft)
- Lowest elevation: 27 m (89 ft)
- Population (2023): 2,718
  - Density: 109.4/km^{2} (283.4/sq mi)
- Time zone: UTC+01:00 (CET)
  - Summer (DST): UTC+02:00 (CEST)
- INSEE/Postal code: 34063 /34720
- ^{1} French Land Register data, which excludes lakes, ponds, glaciers > 1 km^{2} (0.386 sq mi or 247 acres) and river estuaries.

Caux (French pronunciation: [ko]; Occitan: Cauç) is a commune in the Hérault department in southern France.

== Geography ==
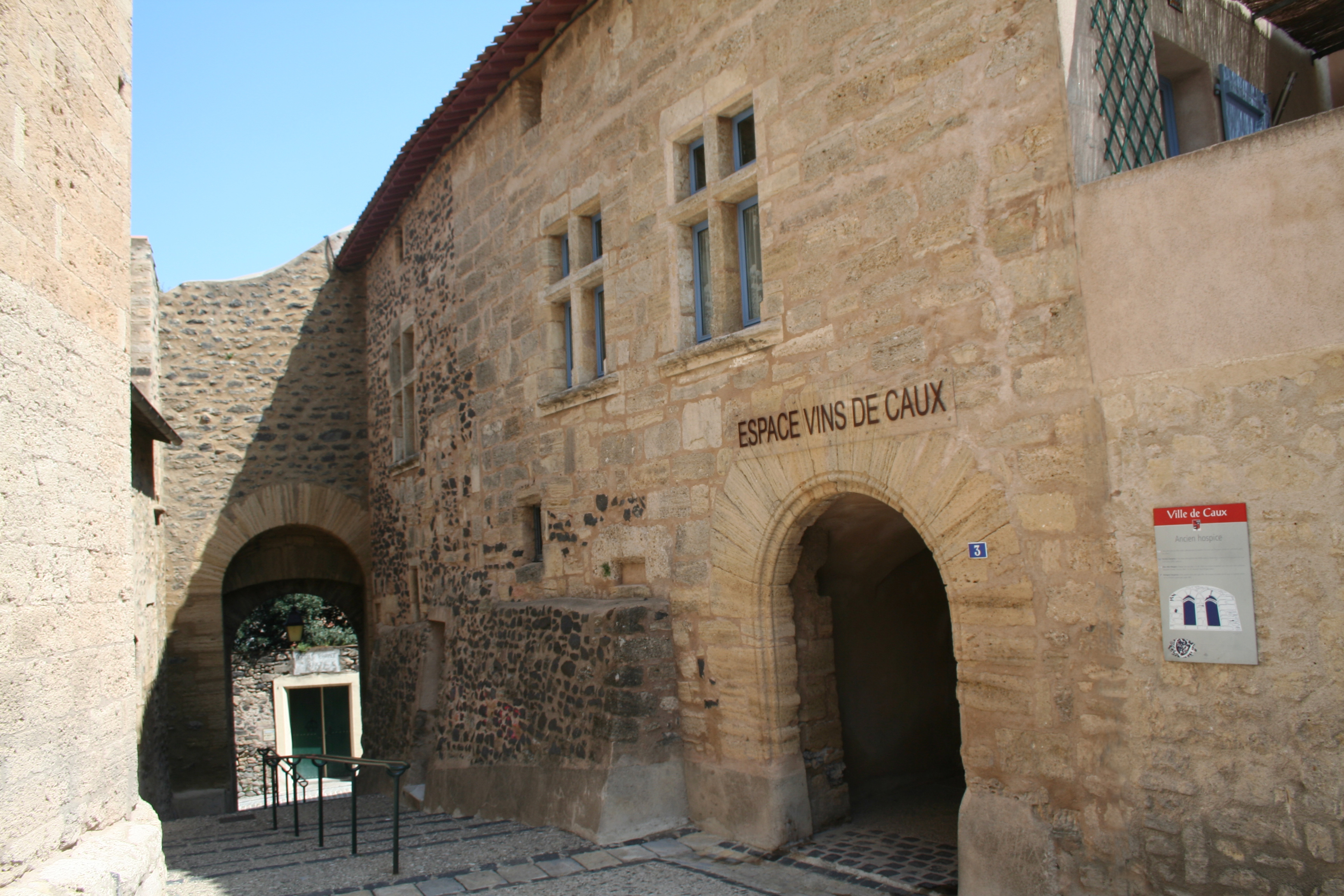
View in the circulade

Caux is a Circulade village located near Pézenas.

== Toponymy ==
The origin of the name "Caux" has two possible explanations:

1. It can come from Occitan "caus" which means "lime". This is possible because limestone is very present on the territory, lime kilns are numerous; we find their remains at Sallèles and Maro Road.
2. The name can come from an expression of pre-Indo-European origin: "cal-so", that is to say rock, shelter. Indeed, on its base at 103 meters above sea level, Caux dominates the surroundings.

== Population ==
Historical population
| Year | Pop. | ±% p.a. |
|---|---|---|
| 1968 | 1,711 | — |
| 1975 | 1,546 | −1.44% |
| 1982 | 1,578 | +0.29% |
| 1990 | 1,709 | +1.00% |
| 1999 | 1,968 | +1.58% |
| 2007 | 2,507 | +3.07% |
| 2012 | 2,506 | −0.01% |
| 2017 | 2,560 | +0.43% |
| 2023 | 2,718 | +1.00% |
Source: INSEE

== Administration ==
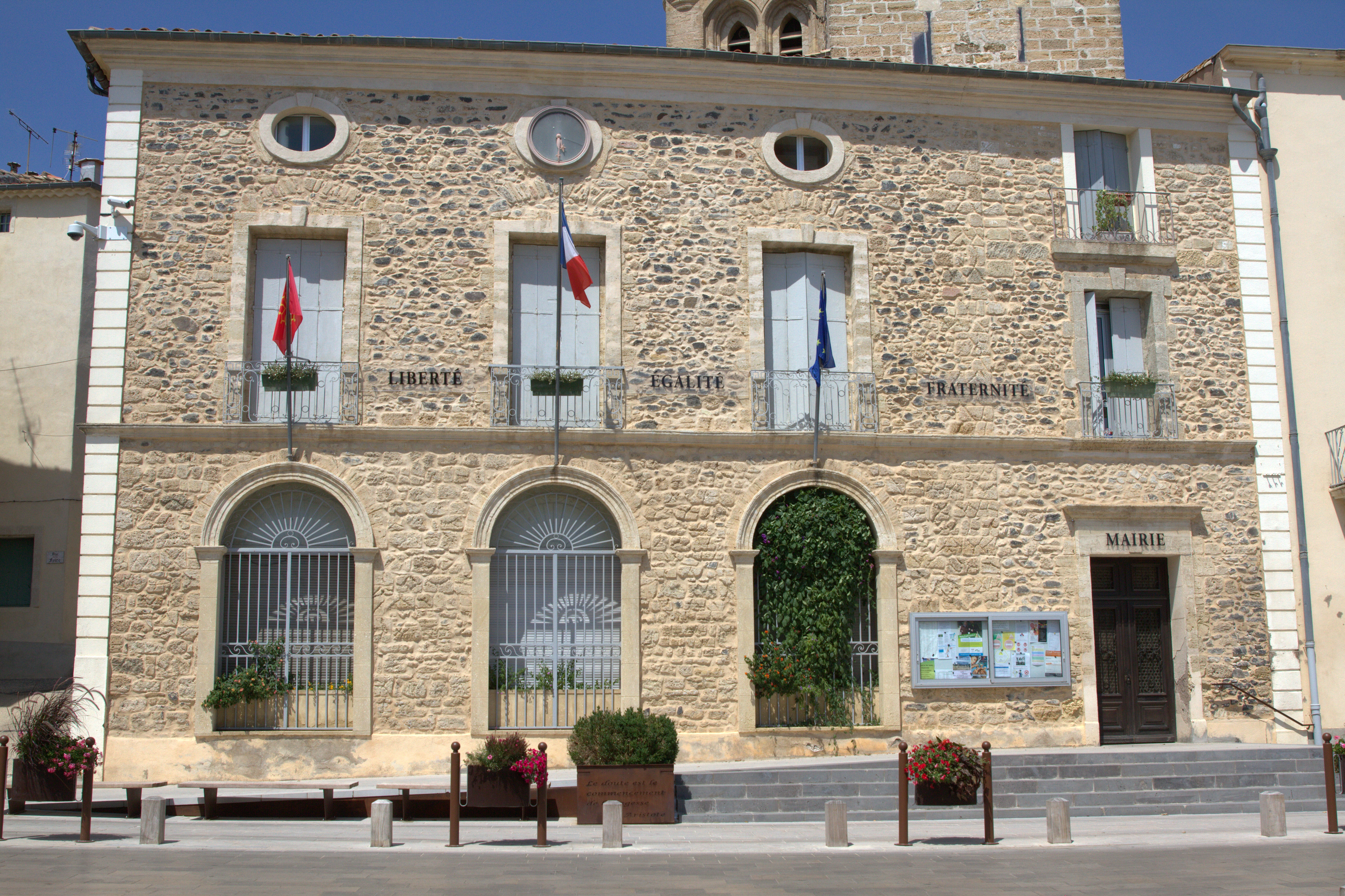
Town hall of Caux

| Election | Mayor | Party | Occupation |
|---|---|---|---|
| 1971 | Michel Estadieu | PS | |
| 1983 | Jacques Vailhère | RPR | |
| 2001 | Jean Martinez | DVD | Professor at University of Montpellier |
| 2020 | Jean-Charles Desplan | | |

== Personalities ==
- Jean-Jacques Causse
- Dom Bédos de Celles

== See also ==
- Communes of the Hérault department
