= Rouffiac-d'Aude =

Commune in Occitanie, France

- Commune
- Coat of arms
- Location of Rouffiac-d'Aude
- Location within France Location within Occitanie
- Coordinates: 43°07′45″N 2°17′59″E
- Country: France
- Region: Occitania
- Department: Aude
- Arrondissement: Carcassonne
- Canton: Carcassonne-3
- Intercommunality: Carcassonne Agglo

Government
  - Mayor (2020–2026): Thierry Mascaraque
- Area^{1}: 5.24 km^{2} (2.02 sq mi)
- Elevation: 119 m (390 ft)
- Highest elevation: 289 m (948 ft)
- Lowest elevation: 130 m (430 ft)
- Population (2023): 514
  - Density: 98.1/km^{2} (254/sq mi)
- Time zone: UTC+01:00 (CET)
  - Summer (DST): UTC+02:00 (CEST)
- INSEE/Postal code: 11325 /11250
- ^{1} French Land Register data, which excludes lakes, ponds, glaciers > 1 km^{2} (0.386 sq mi or 247 acres) and river estuaries.

Rouffiac-d'Aude (French pronunciation: [ʁufjak dod]; Occitan: Rofiac d'Aude) is a commune in the Aude department in southern France, 12 kilometres (7.5 mi) south of Carcassonne.

== Population ==
Historical population
Year	Pop.	±% p.a.
1968	278	—
1975	240	−2.08%
1982	292	+2.84%
1990	310	+0.75%
1999	340	+1.03%
2007	341	+0.04%
2012	428	+4.65%
2017	441	+0.60%
2023	514	+2.59%
Source: INSEE

Inhabitants are called Rouffiacois.

== See also ==
- Communes of the Aude department
