= Circulade =

Type of village in southern France

Localization of the circulades in France

In the Languedoc-Roussillon region of the south of France, a circulade is a traditional village that has been built in concentric circles.

== Origin of the term ==
The neologism and the concept were proposed in 1992 by Krzysztof Pawlowski, an architect-urban planner of Polish origin specialist of the historic cities, in his work Circulades languedociennes de l'an mille.

Though the highly structured circulade plans were not identified as a unique urbanistic phenomenon until 1992, they are medieval in origin, dating from the eleventh and twelfth centuries, two centuries earlier than the planned bastides of the region. The Larousse does not list this neologism for an ancient form of urbanisation, which has been adopted by an association formed to promote these "circular villages"; Jacques Heers included it in his handbook La ville au Moyen Âge en Occident (Hachette Pluriel, 1992).

An earlier designation, used by geographers, is "round village" as evidenced by Louis Josserand's article, Les villages ronds du Razès (Aude), published in the Revue geographic des Pyrénées et du Sud-Ouest in 1931.

== Pawlowski's thesis ==
According to Krzysztof Pawlowski, an architect of Polish extraction working for the UNESCO patrimony section, a medieval circular village is a village whose circle is the basis of all or part of the organization of the parcel system. The essential element of the system called "circulade" would be the succession of rings regularly arranged around the central core in the form of ribbons of terraced houses. Until now, the bastides of the Southwest, cities based on the rectangular pattern, were considered to be the first manifestations of urban creation in the Middle Ages. However, for Krzysztof Pawlowski, in Languedoc the circular model would have formed two centuries before the country houses and would thus have marked the birth of European town planning.

== Operation ==
From 1993, in Aude, Hérault and Gard, around forty agglomerations of this type (villages or small towns) were publicized for tourist-economic purposes, with a website to support, by Association des villages circulaires du Languedoc (Circular villages of Languedoc's Association), under the generic name of "circulades", neologism formed for the needs of the cause. The “circulades” met with a favorable response from mayors as they were likely to generate cultural tourism and economic spinoffs while slowing down the desertification of the countryside. They benefit from the start from the support of the regional community of Languedoc-Roussillon.

== Pictures of a circulades ==
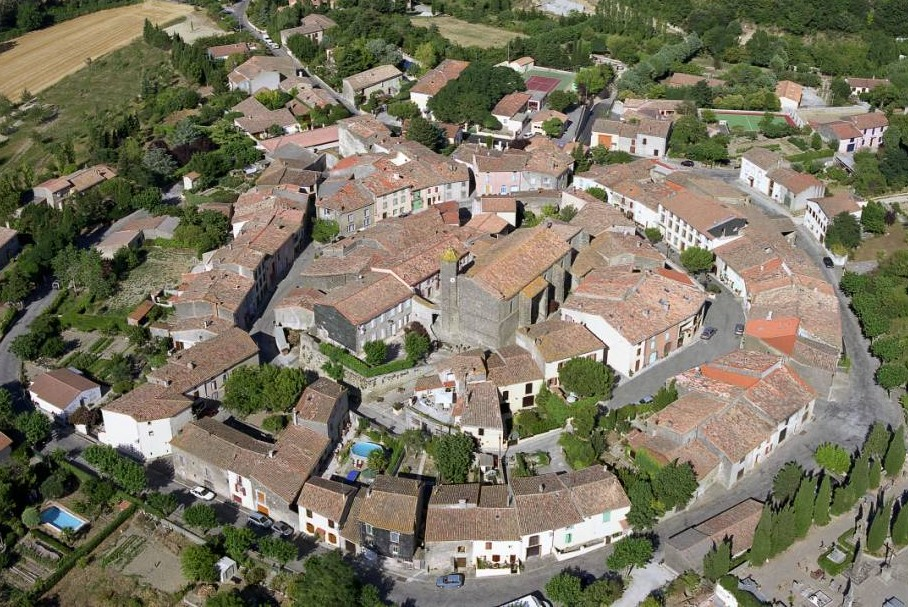
View of Alairac's circulade

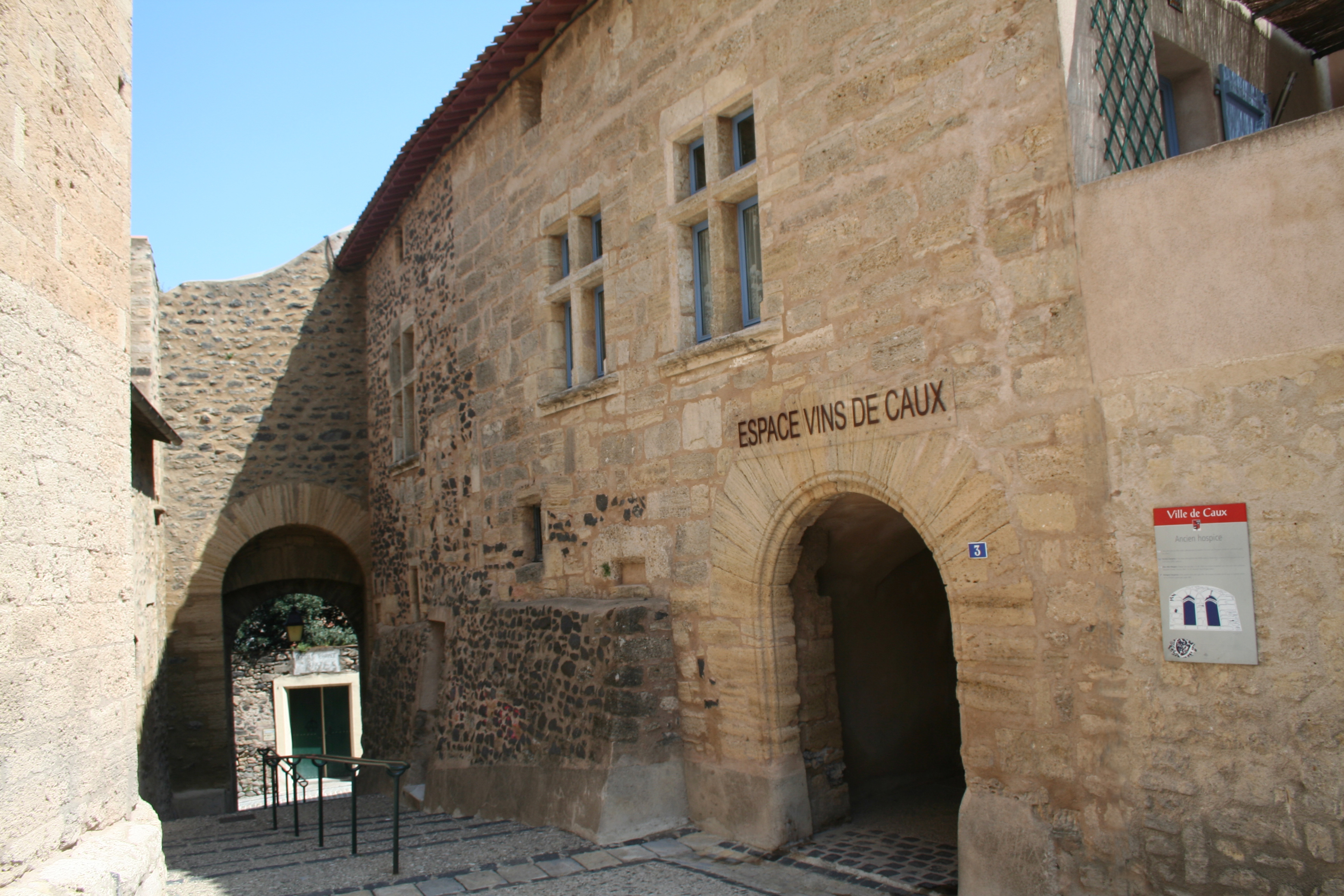
Street in Caux's circulade

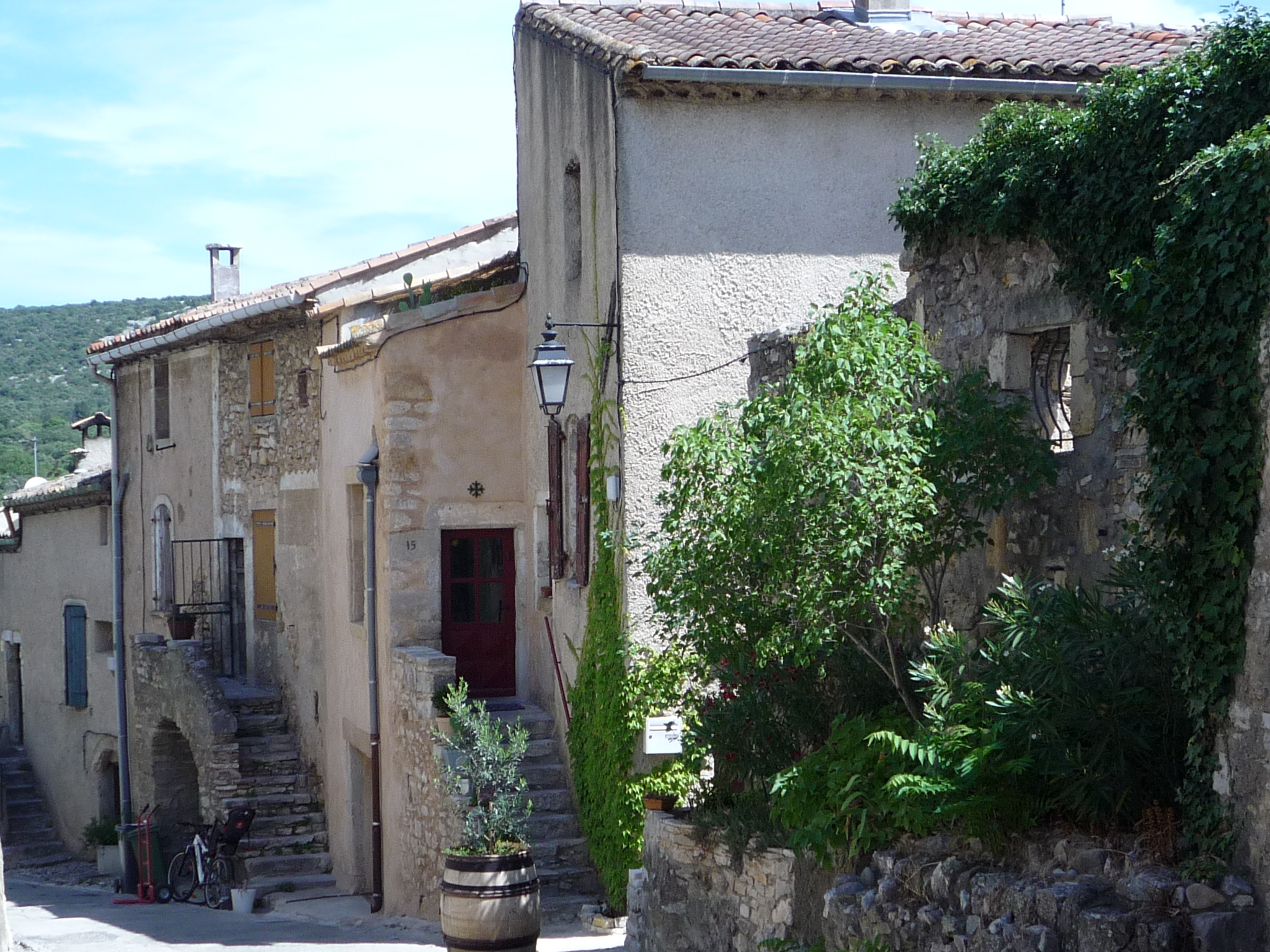
Houses in Puéchabon's circulade

== See also ==
- Tulou, circular Hakka dwellings in Fujian, China, each able to house a small village
