= Preixan =

Commune in Occitanie, France

- Commune
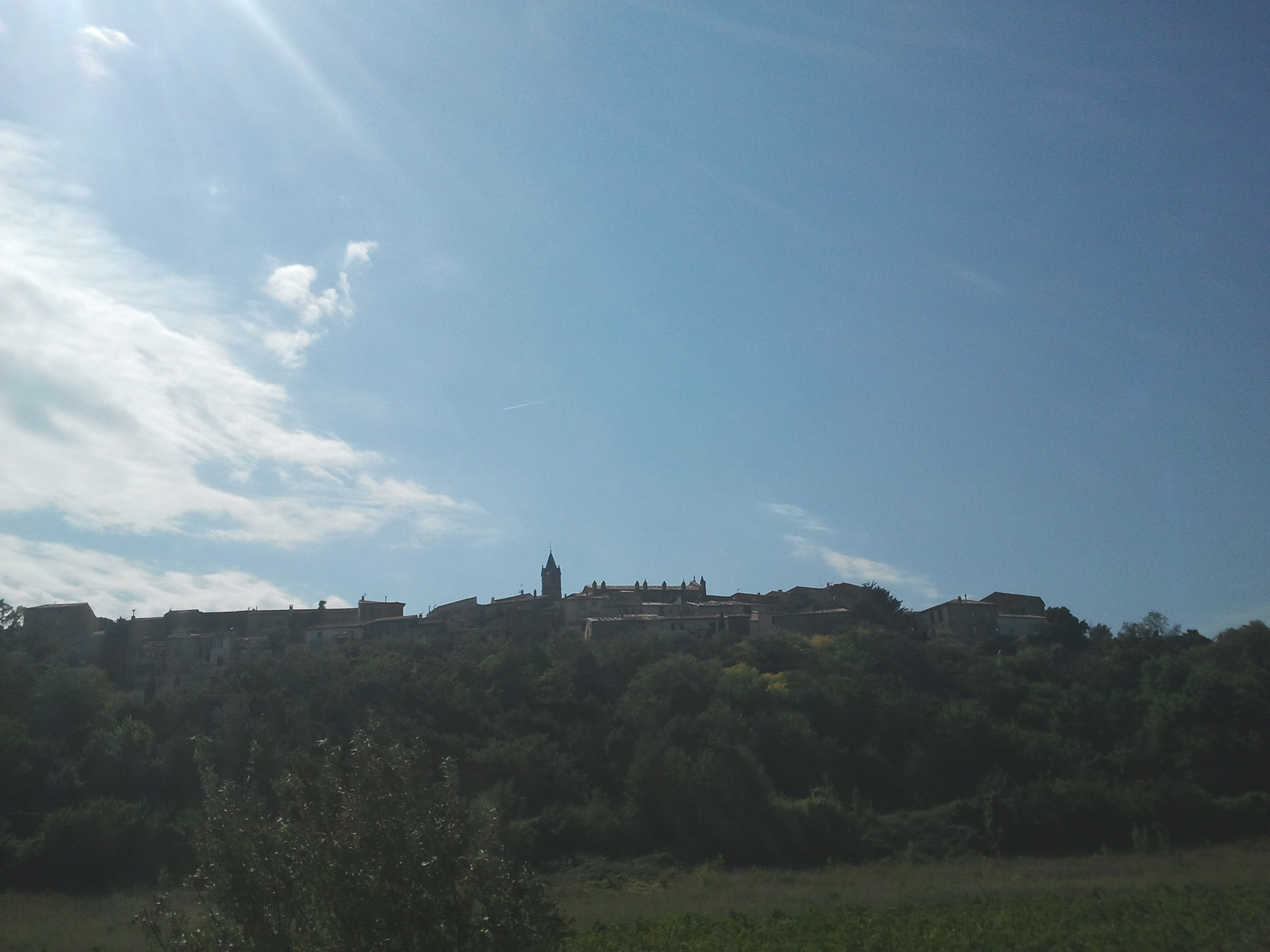
- A general view of Preixan

- Coat of arms
- Location of Preixan
- Location within France Location within Occitanie
- Coordinates: 43°08′49″N 2°17′23″E
- Country: France
- Region: Occitania
- Department: Aude
- Arrondissement: Carcassonne
- Canton: Carcassonne-3
- Intercommunality: Carcassonne Agglo

Government
  - Mayor (2020–2026): Patricia Dhumez
- Area^{1}: 8.56 km^{2} (3.31 sq mi)
- Elevation: 165 m (541 ft)
- Highest elevation: 341 m (1,119 ft)
- Lowest elevation: 122 m (400 ft)
- Population (2023): 637
  - Density: 74.4/km^{2} (193/sq mi)
- Time zone: UTC+01:00 (CET)
  - Summer (DST): UTC+02:00 (CEST)
- INSEE/Postal code: 11299 /11250
- ^{1} French Land Register data, which excludes lakes, ponds, glaciers > 1 km^{2} (0.386 sq mi or 247 acres) and river estuaries.

Preixan (French pronunciation: [pʁɛksɑ̃]; Occitan: Preissa) is a commune in the Aude department in southern France.

== Population ==
Historical population
Year	Pop.	±% p.a.
1968	403	—
1975	378	−0.91%
1982	365	−0.50%
1990	431	+2.10%
1999	445	+0.36%
2007	509	+1.69%
2012	593	+3.10%
2017	619	+0.86%
2023	637	+0.48%
Source: INSEE

== See also ==
- Communes of the Aude department
