= Roullens =

Commune in Occitanie, France

- Commune
- Coat of arms
- Location of Roullens
- Location within France Location within Occitanie
- Coordinates: 43°09′57″N 2°16′23″E
- Country: France
- Region: Occitania
- Department: Aude
- Arrondissement: Carcassonne
- Canton: Carcassonne-3
- Intercommunality: Carcassonne Agglo

Government
  - Mayor (2020–2026): Roland Combettes
- Area^{1}: 7.89 km^{2} (3.05 sq mi)
- Elevation: 226 m (741 ft)
- Highest elevation: 400 m (1,300 ft)
- Lowest elevation: 132 m (433 ft)
- Population (2023): 588
  - Density: 74.5/km^{2} (193/sq mi)
- Time zone: UTC+01:00 (CET)
  - Summer (DST): UTC+02:00 (CEST)
- INSEE/Postal code: 11327 /11290
- ^{1} French Land Register data, which excludes lakes, ponds, glaciers > 1 km^{2} (0.386 sq mi or 247 acres) and river estuaries.

Roullens (French pronunciation: [ʁulɛ̃s]; Occitan: Rollens) is a commune in the Aude department in southern France.

== Population ==
Historical population
Year	Pop.	±% p.a.
1968	226	—
1975	213	−0.84%
1982	251	+2.37%
1990	348	+4.17%
1999	416	+2.00%
2007	473	+1.62%
2012	506	+1.36%
2017	465	−1.68%
2023	588	+3.99%
Source: INSEE

== See also ==
- Communes of the Aude department
