= Lavalette, Aude =

Commune in Occitanie, France

Lavalette
- Commune
- Coat of arms
- Location of Lavalette
- Location within France Location within Occitanie
- Coordinates: 43°11′11″N 2°16′00″E
- Country: France
- Region: Occitania
- Department: Aude
- Arrondissement: Carcassonne
- Canton: Carcassonne-3
- Intercommunality: Carcassonne Agglo

Government
  - Mayor (2020–2026): René Milhau
- Area^{1}: 6.55 km^{2} (2.53 sq mi)
- Elevation: 182 m (597 ft)
- Highest elevation: 241 m (791 ft)
- Lowest elevation: 134 m (440 ft)
- Population (2023): 1,612
  - Density: 246/km^{2} (637/sq mi)
- Time zone: UTC+01:00 (CET)
  - Summer (DST): UTC+02:00 (CEST)
- INSEE/Postal code: 11199 /11290
- ^{1} French Land Register data, which excludes lakes, ponds, glaciers > 1 km^{2} (0.386 sq mi or 247 acres) and river estuaries.

Lavalette (French pronunciation: [lavalɛt]; Occitan: La Valeta) is a commune in the Aude department in southern France.

== Population ==
Historical population
Year	Pop.	±% p.a.
1968	317	—
1975	458	+5.40%
1982	617	+4.35%
1990	919	+5.11%
1999	1,067	+1.67%
2007	1,224	+1.73%
2012	1,394	+2.64%
2017	1,499	+1.46%
2023	1,612	+1.22%
Source: INSEE

== See also ==
- Communes of the Aude department
