= Jean-Baptiste Meynier =

French soldier

- Born: 22 April 1749; Avignon, Papal States
- Died: 3 December 1813 (aged 64) Mainz, Mont-Tonnerre, France
- Allegiance: France
- Branch: Infantry
- Rank: General of Division
- Conflicts: American Revolutionary War; French Revolutionary Wars; Napoleonic Wars
- Awards: Légion d'Honneur, CC 1804

Jean-Baptiste Meynier (French pronunciation: [ʒɑ̃ batist mɛnje]; 22 April 1749 – 3 December 1813) was a French soldier who served during the American Revolutionary War, the French Revolutionary Wars, and the Napoleonic Wars. Between 1792 and 1793, he rose from a captain to a general of division. During the Montenotte Campaign in 1796, he commanded a division under Napoleon Bonaparte, who had a low opinion of his military talent. In 1803 he was appointed to command the fortress of Mainz. He died there in 1813.

== Life ==
Meynier enlisted in the French royal army in 1765 and later fought in the American Revolutionary War. He returned to France in 1785 and was promoted to sous-lieutenant in 1788, lieutenant in 1791, and captain in 1792.

While serving in the army of Adam Philippe, Comte de Custine on the Rhine River, Meynier was ordered to defend Königstein Fortress with a few soldiers. On 5 January 1793 the French suffered a local defeat at the hands of the Prussians. When the Prussians summoned Meynier to surrender the place, he refused and put on such a display of bravado that his enemies did not dare to attack the tiny garrison. He held out until it was finally obvious that no help would ever arrive, surrendering on 9 March. For this exploit, Meynier was jumped in rank from captain to general of brigade.

He was appointed commander of Landau on 7 April 1793.

On 20 May 1793, Meynier was promoted to general of brigade and on 27 September that year he became a general of division. Meynier led the Avantgarde of the Army of the Rhine at the First Battle of Wissembourg on 13 October 1793. Augustin Joseph Isambert's brigade included the 6th, 48th, and 105th Line Infantry Regiments and the Corrèze, Lot-et-Garonne, and Jura National Guard Battalions. Jean-Baptiste Ferrette's brigade was made up of the 93rd and 95th Line Infantry Regiments. Jean-François Combez commanded the 1st and 2nd Grenadier Battalions, and the 7th Hussars, 8th and 10th Chasseurs à Cheval, and 8th, 11th, and 17th Dragoons.

A 30 October 1793 order of battle shows Meynier's Avantgarde consisting of the same units as at Wissembourg, with the 93rd and 95th Line subtracted and the 12th Line added. In addition, the cavalry regiments were regrouped under the command of Jean Claude Loubat de Bohan. On 17 to 20 September 1794, Meynier led a division in the battle of Kaiserslautern. In the Coalition victory, both sides lost about 1,000 killed and wounded, but the Coalition forces captured 3,100 Frenchmen, four guns, and three colors.

A muster roll for Napoleon Bonaparte's Army of Italy on 9 April 1796 shows Meynier in command of one of two divisions in André Masséna's Advance Guard. Under his leadership were 9,526 troops in the 11th and 27th Light Infantry Demi-Brigades, the 25th, 51st, old 51st, and 55th Line Infantry Demi-Brigades. He led these troops during the Montenotte Campaign. On 22 April 1796, Bonaparte broke up his division and attached Meynier to headquarters. On 14 August 1796, Bonaparte wrote a brutally frank assessment of his generals. He considered Meynier, Pierre Dominique Garnier, and Raphaël de Casabianca as, "incapable; not fit to command a battalion in a war as active as this one."

Meynier was appointed commander of the 18th Military District in 1800. He was named governor of the fortress of Mainz in 1803. He received the Commander's Cross of the Légion d'Honneur in 1804.

Meynier died in Mainz on 3 December 1813. His death occurred during the Allied blockade of the city, which lasted from 21 November 1813 and ended on 4 May 1814 after Emperor Napoleon's abdication. Charles Antoine Morand was the general in command of the 17,000 defenders.
