= François Mulard =

French painter

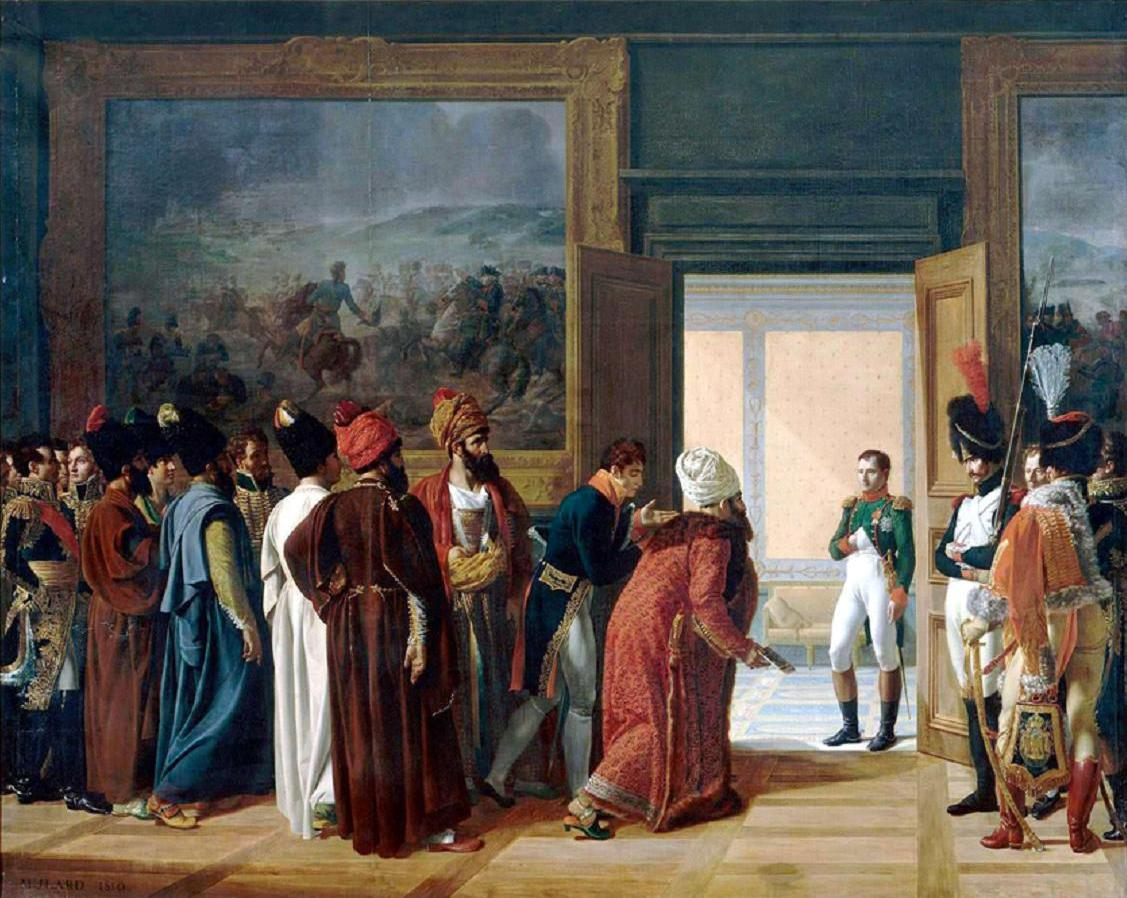
The Persian Envoy Mirza Mohammad-Reza Qazvini meeting with Napoleon I at the Finckenstein Palace, 27 Avril 1807, by François Mulard

François Henri Mulard (1769–1850) was a neoclassical French painter. He is known for painting the encounter of Persian envoy Mirza Mohammad-Reza Qazvini with Napoleon at the Finckenstein Palace on 27 April 1807.

== Early life ==
François Mulard was a student of Jacques-Louis David. He was admitted to the competition of the Prix de Rome in 1799 where he won a second prize. He competed again in 1802, but was not ranked. He was a painter at the Royal Gobelins Manufactory, where he taught drawing as the director of the living model, with students working each week alternately on plaster models or live male models.

== Career ==
He is the author of the painting commemorating the meeting of Persian envoy Mirza Mohammad-Reza Qazvini with Napoleon I at the Finckenstein Palace on April 27, 1807, which led to the signing of the Treaty of Finckenstein. At the Salon of 1812 at the Louvre he displayed The Death of General Causse at the Battle of Dego, a scene from the French Revolutionary War. In 1830, he was one of the co-founders of the Free Society of Fine Arts in Paris, where he became vice-president in 1832 along with his colleague Louis-Alexandre Péron (1776–1855).

== Works ==
- Hector reproaching Paris, 1819, Clermont-Ferrand museum.

== Gallery ==
The Death of General Causse at the Battle of Dego, 1812

== See also ==
- List of French artists
