= Battle of Borghetto =

Battle of the War of the First Coalition

- Part of the Italian campaign of 1796–1797 in the War of the First Coalition
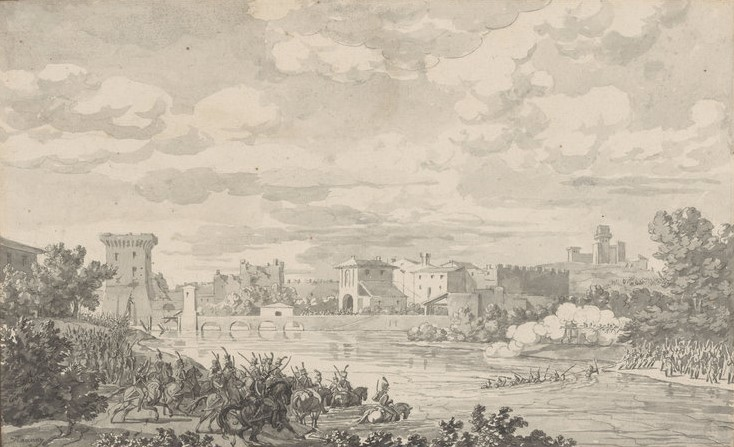
- Battle of Borghetto by Nicolas-Antoine Taunay, between 1802 and 1814
Date	30 May 1796
Location	Near Valeggio sul Mincio, Italy 45.3500°N 10.7333°E
Result	French victory

Belligerents
(French First Republic) France	(Habsburg monarchy) Austria

Commanders and leaders
(French First Republic) Napoleon Bonaparte (French First Republic) Charles-Pierre Augereau (French First Republic) André Masséna (French First Republic) Jean-Mathieu-Philibert Sérurier (French First Republic) Charles Edward Jennings	(Habsburg monarchy) Johann Beaulieu (Habsburg monarchy) Michael von Melas

Strength
28,000	19,000

Casualties and losses
500	572, 4 guns

War of the First Coalition:
Italian Campaign
current battle
Napoleon as subordinate
Napoleon in command

The Battle of Borghetto, near Valeggio sul Mincio in the Veneto of northern Italy, took place during the War of the First Coalition, part of the French Revolutionary Wars. On 30 May 1796, a French army led by General Napoleon Bonaparte forced a crossing of the Mincio River in the face of opposition from an Austrian army commanded by Feldzeugmeister Johann Peter Beaulieu. This action compelled the Austrian army to retreat north up the Adige valley to Trento, leaving the fortress of Mantua to be besieged by the French.

== Background ==
In early May, Bonaparte's French army won the battles of Fombio and Lodi and overran the Austrian province of Lombardy. Beaulieu evacuated Milan except for a 2,000-man garrison that he left in the citadel. In mid-May, the French occupied Milan and Brescia. At this time, the army had to pause to put down a revolt in Pavia. At the village of Binasco, the French atrociously massacred the adult male population. Beaulieu pulled his army back behind the Mincio, with strong patrols west of the river. He urgently tried to put the fortress of Mantua into a state where it could sustain a siege.

=== Geography ===
The Mincio River exits Lake Garda at Peschiera del Garda and winds its way south for 30 kilometers. At a point 8 km (5.0 mi) before it arrives at Mantua, it veers to the east. The river was a maximum of 40 m (44 yd) wide, but in May the snow-melt from the Alps made it difficult to ford. Between Lake Garda and Mantua there were only four bridges, from north to south, at Peschiera, Borghetto, Goito, and at Rivalta near the bend in the river. Near Peschiera and Borghetto there are a series of moraines that form ridges, which can conceal troop movements. In the area of Goito and Mantua, the terrain is flat. To the north, Lake Garda extends about 50 km (31.1 mi) to its northern tip at Riva del Garda. Other noteworthy locations are the towns of Castelnuovo del Garda 6 km (3.7 mi) east of Peschiera, Valeggio sul Mincio on a hill 1 km (0.6 mi) east of Borghetto, Salionze 6 km (3.7 mi) north of Valeggio, Campagnola 2 km (1.2 mi) southwest of Valeggio, and Villafranca di Verona 8 km (5.0 mi) east of Valeggio.

=== Forces ===
The death of Amédée Emmanuel François Laharpe at the Battle of Fombio caused Bonaparte to reorganize his army. The three divisions were commanded by Generals of Division André Masséna (9,481), Pierre Augereau (6,089), Jean-Mathieu-Philibert Sérurier (9,075), while the 6,262 picked troops and cavalry of the advance guard were led by Charles Edward Jennings de Kilmaine. General of Division Hyacinthe François Joseph Despinoy with 5,278 blockaded the citadel of Milan and 5,500 more garrisoned different places in northwest Italy.

To bring Mantua's large fortress up to a defensible level, Beaulieu assigned the brigades of General-Majors Gerhard Rosselmini, Mathias Rukavina von Boynograd, and Josef Philipp Vukassovich to defend the city. Altogether, Feldmarschall-Leutnant Josef Canto d'Irles had 12,800 men in his garrison, though many of these soldiers soon became ill after their hard service in the Montenotte Campaign and the Lodi campaign.

Beaulieu posted General-major Anton Lipthay de Kisfalud with 3,049 infantry and 779 cavalry at Peschiera. Feldmarschall-Leutnant Michelangelo Alessandro Colli-Marchi held the crossing at Goito with a 3,558-man division consisting of Rukavina's 2,583 infantry plus Austrian and Neapolitan cavalry. Canto d'Irles and his large garrison covered the Rivalta bridge. In the center, Feldmarschall-Leutnants Michael von Melas and Karl Philipp Sebottendorf jointly commanded 8,169 infantry and 2,086 cavalry to defend the Mincio near Valeggio.

=== Sparring ===
Bonaparte determined to use the bridge at Borghetto for his crossing. To misdirect the Austrians, he ordered a feint attack in the direction of Peschiera. He sent General of Brigade Jean-Baptiste Dominique Rusca to Salò on the west shore of Lake Garda, where the French began to collect boats. To hide his true intentions, Bonaparte held his three combat divisions well to the west of the Mincio.

Beaulieu reacted as the French commander hoped. Instead of concentrating his forces at the bridges, the Austrian commander attempted to set up a cordon defense on the river between Peschiera and Goito. In the center, Beaulieu deployed 4,500 soldiers in the brigades of General-major Peter Gummer and Oberst Ernst Beust at Salionze and Oliosi, General-major Franz Nicoletti's 2,600-man brigade at Campagnola and Pozzolo, and General-major Philipp Pittoni von Dannenfeld's 3,100-strong brigade in and around Valeggio.

In the midst of this movement, Beaulieu became ill. On 29 May, a series of confusing orders emanated from Austrian headquarters, throwing the army into disarray. This proved to be a lucky break for Bonaparte because the French advance began early in the morning of 30 May. The French commander ordered Kilmaine to advance from Castiglione delle Stiviere to Borghetto via Solferino, with Masséna's division in support. Augereau covered the left flank while Sérurier moved up on the right flank.

== Battle ==
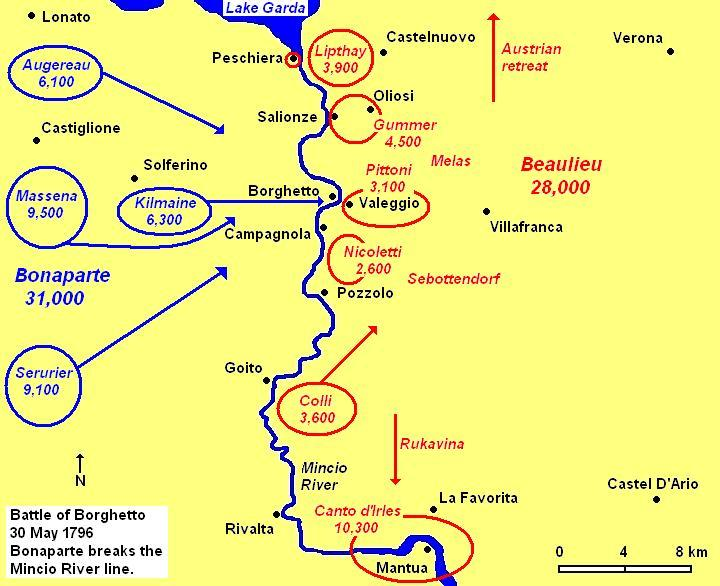
Battle of Borghetto map, 30 May 1796

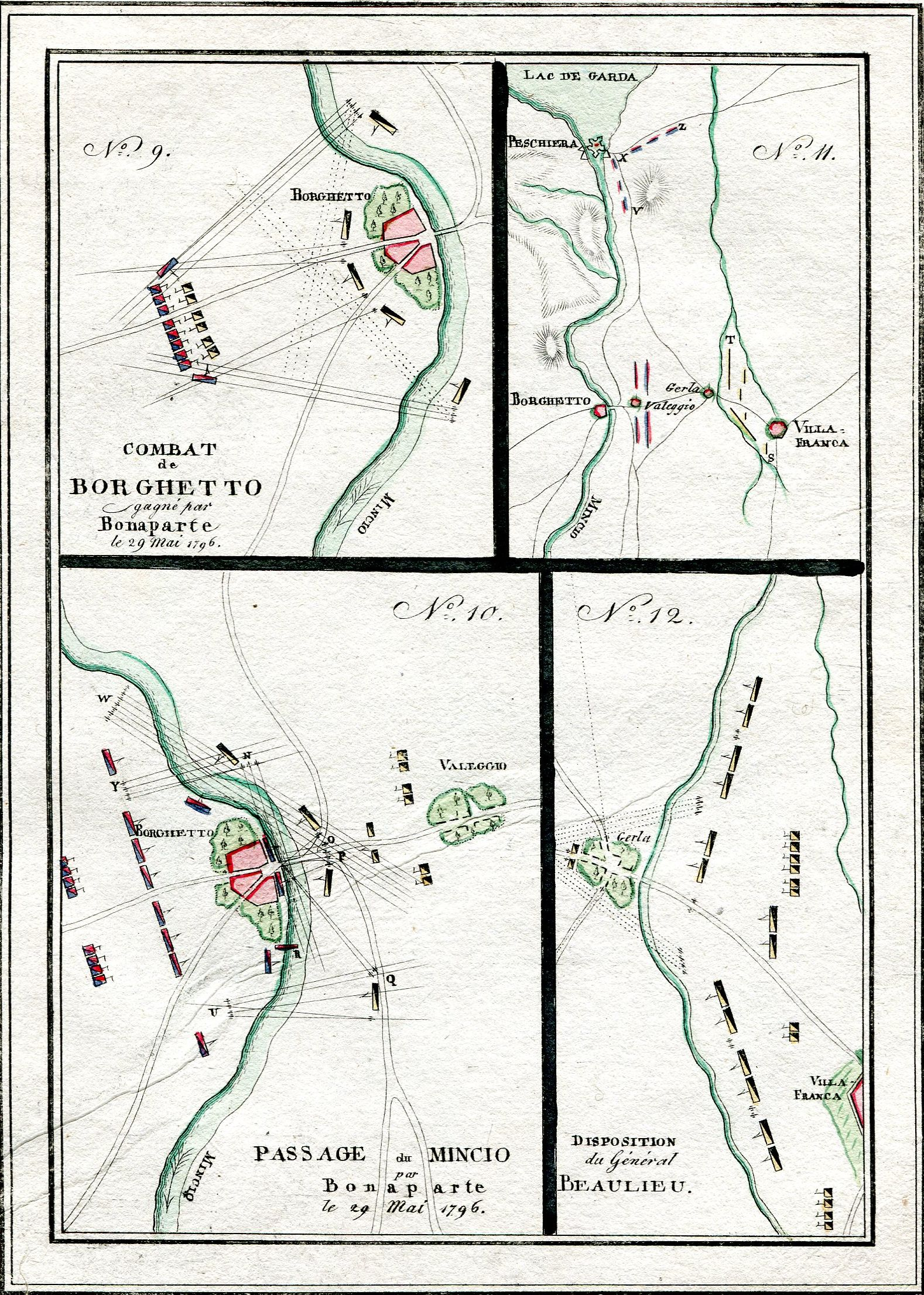
Plan de Combat de Borghetto gagné par Bonaparte le 29 Mai 1796. Passage du Mincio par Bonaparte le 29 Mai 1796.

Kilmaine's troops pushed back the Austrian hussar outposts and reached the bridge about 9 am. When the retreating horsemen reached the bridge, there was a jam on the narrow span. A number of Austrians left the roadway and crossed the river, betraying the fordable points to the French. Only single battalions of the Strassoldo Infantry Regiment Nr. 27 and Jordis Infantry Regiment Nr. 59 were available to defend the span. Under the direction of Pittoni, the badly outnumbered Austrians put up a spirited fight. But, with Beaulieu's army in some disorder, few reserves arrived to help the defenders and soon French troops led by Chef de Brigade Gaspard Amédée Gardanne forded the river and pushed the defenders uphill toward Valeggio.

After some fighting, the French cleared Valeggio but the Austrian cavalry prevented them from advancing beyond the town. Meanwhile, General-major Prince Friedrich Franz Xaver of Hohenzollern-Hechingen rallied the defeated Austrians and even mounted a counterattack on the town. Sometime in the afternoon, some Austrian hussars rode into the town and nearly captured Bonaparte. This incident persuaded the French commander to form a cavalry bodyguard called the Guides and place Jean-Baptiste Bessières in charge. Eventually, this unit would evolve into the Chasseurs à Cheval of the Imperial Guard.

The Austrians reacted slowly to the crisis. At nearby Campagnola, Sebottendorf's gaze remained riveted on some French troops in his front and he failed to send reinforcements to Valeggio. Farther north at Salionze, aggressive French patrols also distracted Melas from Bonaparte's true purpose. From distant Goito, Colli alertly marched his entire force to the north to help the center, but he arrived too late to help. Beaulieu ordered the army to retreat to the north.

Sebottendorf tried to recapture Valeggio, was repulsed, and retreated to Villafranca. Colli sent Rukavina's brigade back to rejoin the Mantua garrison and took his cavalry to Villafranca. Melas gathered up the troops of the right center and fell back to Castelnuovo. He was soon joined by Hohenzollern's force. Lipthay soon abandoned Peschiera, pursued by the French. When one of Augereau's units got too close, Lipthay's cavalry cut it to pieces, inflicting 100 casualties for a loss of only nine Austrians.

== Results ==
That night, Beaulieu's units marched north from Castelnuovo and Villafranca. By the next morning, most units reached safety at Dolcè in the Adige valley. The Austrians admitted 572 soldiers killed, wounded, or captured. French losses are estimated at 500. In June, the French invested the now-isolated fortress of Mantua. Over the next month, the Austrian army received significant reinforcements from Germany and several new division and brigade commanders. In addition, Feldmarschall Dagobert von Wurmser replaced Beaulieu as army commander. From June 1796 until February 1797, all the major engagements in northern Italy would revolve around the Siege of Mantua.

== Commentary ==
One authority wrote, "Beaulieu had fallen into the error of trying to guard all possible crossings over the Mincio, and in consequence his over-extended army was without a reserve."

== See also ==
- Siege of Mantua (1796-1797)
- Battle of Fombio 7–9 May 1796
- Battle of Lodi 10 May 1796
