= Gerhard Rosselmini =

Austrian general (c.1742–1796)

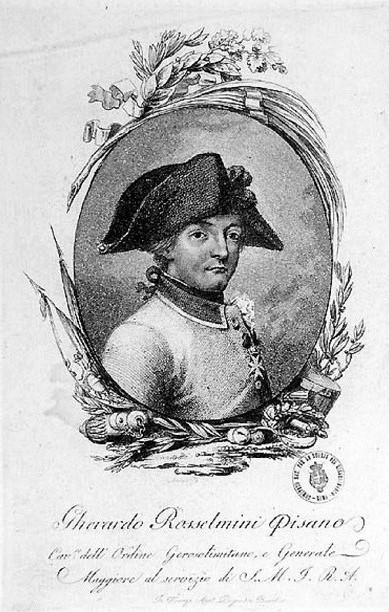
- Gerhard Rosselmini
- Born: 1742; Near Pisa, Italy
- Died: 19 November 1796 (aged 53–54); Vicenza, Italy
- Military career
- Allegiance: (Habsburg monarchy) Habsburg Austria
- Branch: Infantry
- Rank: General Major
- Conflicts: Austro-Turkish War (1788–1791); French Revolutionary Wars
- Awards: Order of Malta, Knight

Gerhard Ritter von Rosselmini or Gherardo Rosselmini or Gerhard Roselmini (c. 1742 – 19 November 1796) became a general officer in the Austrian army during the French Revolutionary Wars and fought in several actions against Napoleon Bonaparte's French army during the 1796 Italian campaign. From 1789 to 1794 he commanded an Austrian infantry regiment. He led the unit in several battles on the upper Rhine in 1793 before being captured. He was promoted to General Major in early 1794. Rosselmini died in Italy while on campaign.

== Early career ==
Rosselmini was born around 1742 near Pisa in modern-day Italy. (Note: The infobox picture refers to Rosselmini as a "Pisano", that is, a Pisan.) In 1789, Rosselmini assumed command as oberst (colonel) of the Austrian Kaiser Infantry Regiment Nr. 1. Its previous commander was Cajetan von Lichtenberg. The regiment's Leib (1st) Battalion distinguished itself at the Siege of Belgrade during the Austro-Turkish War, while the 3rd Battalion fought at the Battle of Focșani. However, the source was not clear if Rosselmini was present during these engagements.

Rosselmini led the Leib and Colonel (2nd) Battalions of the Kaiser Regiment in Dagobert Sigmund von Wurmser's Army of the Upper Rhine, fighting at Insheim and Bad Bergzabern in the Bienwald on 12 and 20 September 1793. He also led the regiment at the First Battle of Wissembourg on 13 October. At Wissembourg, the regiment formed part of the 3rd Column which was led by Feldmarschall-Leutnant Friedrich Freiherr von Hotze. The Kaiser Regiment also fought actions at Neuwiller-lès-Saverne, Bouxwiller, Uttenhoffen, and Reichshoffen, which were collectively part of the Battle of Haguenau. At the Battle of Froeschwiller (18–22 December 1793), Rosselmini was wounded and captured while directing 9 companies of his regiment. He won promotion to Generalmajor on 24 February 1794, to date from 20 February. The Kaiser Regiment transferred to the Austrian Netherlands front in 1794, but it is not clear when Rosselmini's prisoner exchange took place or where he served in 1794–1795. The next commander of the regiment was Ferdinand Nimptsch starting in 1794. Rosselmini held the noble title of Ritter and was a knight of the Order of Malta.

== Italian campaign ==
In April 1796, during the Montenotte Campaign in Italy, Rosselmini commanded a brigade in Feldzeugmeister Johann Peter Beaulieu's Austrian army. At the end of March 1796, his troops lay in their winter quarters at Lodi, far from the front lines. His brigade included one battalion of the Deutschmeister Infantry Regiment Nr. 4 and two battalions of the Strassoldo Infantry Regiment Nr. 27. In the subsequent campaign, Bonaparte's French army quickly separated Beaulieu's Austrian army from its Sardinian allies and forced the Kingdom of Sardinia to sue for peace.

During the Austrian retreat at the beginning of May, Rosselmini's brigade covered the army's left flank by withdrawing through Tortona and marching east to Voghera on the south bank of the Po River. His command passed through Casteggio and Casatisma, finally crossing to the north bank near Pavia on 4 May. Rosselmini guarded the north bank of the Po between Pavia and the Olona River with two battalions, with two more battalions and four cavalry squadrons in support. However, Bonaparte crossed the Po at Piacenza, downstream from Rosselmini's troops, outflanking the Austrian army.

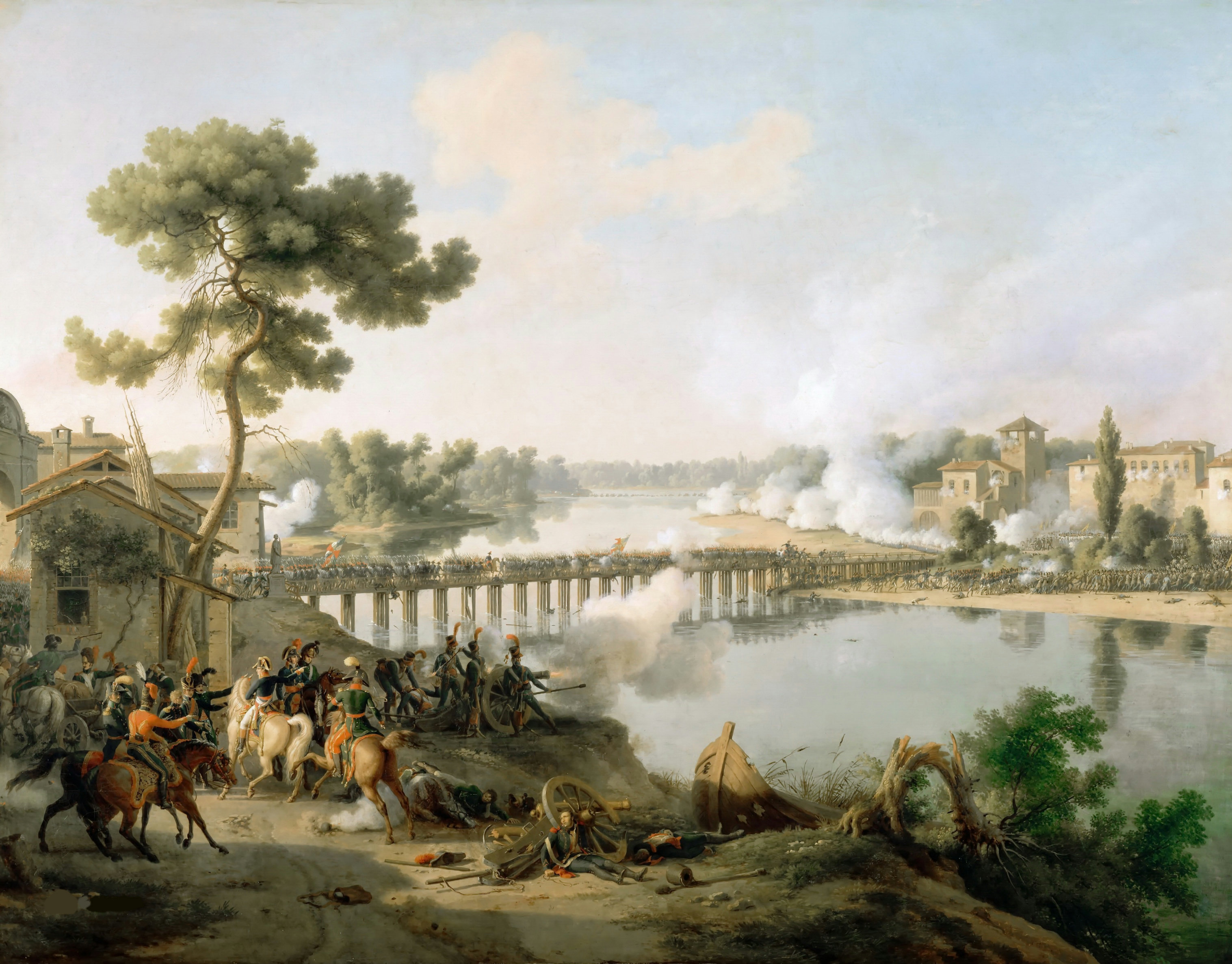
The Battle of Lodi by Louis-François Lejeune

At the Battle of Lodi on 10 May 1796, Rosselmini led a screening force that was tasked to hold until Generalmajor Josef Philipp Vukassovich's rearguard reached Lodi. The force consisted of a 623-man battalion of the Nádasdy Infantry Regiment Nr. 39 and 286 horsemen from the Meszaros Uhlan Regiment. At about mid-day, the French advance guard attacked Rosselmini's troops and drove them back through the town. After withdrawing across the bridge over the Adda River, the Nádasdy battalion, three battalions of Croats, and 8 cannons were deployed nearest to the bridge. The local Austrian commander, Feldmarschall-Leutnant Karl Philipp Sebottendorf decided to hold his position until nightfall. Harassed by French artillery and skirmishers, and assaulted by a column of infantry, the Nádasdy and Croat battalions fell back, abandoning the cannons. Eventually, Sebottendorf was compelled to order a retreat after losing 2,036 men and 12 artillery pieces.

On 16 May, Beaulieu assigned the brigades of Mathias Rukavina, Vukassovich, and Rosselmini to join the defenders of the Mantua fortress. This brought its number of defenders to 12,799 men, who were soon put to work strengthening the fortifications and collecting provisions. Within two weeks the hard service of the past month caused 1,000 men to become sick. Mantua boasted a population of 25,000 and was situated on the south side of a lake. A causeway connected Mantua with its citadel on the north side of the lake. During the first part of the Siege of Mantua, Rosselmini held the citadel with 3,666 soldiers. His command included two battalions of the Nádasdy Regiment (1,332 men), two battalions of the Thurn Infantry Regiment Nr. 43 (1,264 men), and one battalion of the Waradiner Grenz Regiment (1,070). When the siege was briefly raised by the second relief of Mantua in early August, Vukassovich was sent to reinforce the field army with 2,000 men and Rukavina delivered a message to Field Marshal Dagobert Sigmund von Wurmser. Rosselmini must have also been reassigned outside Mantua because he commanded troops during the third relief of Mantua.

During the third relief of Mantua, Rosselmini commanded one of four brigades in Giovanni Marchese di Provera's Main Body. This was part of the 26,432-man Friuli Corps, which was personally accompanied by the new Austrian army commander, Feldzeugmeister József Alvinczi. Provera's First Line included the two brigades of Rosselmini and Generalmajor Anton Lipthay de Kisfalud. These two brigades comprised 8 infantry battalions and 2 cavalry squadrons, or a total of 9,380 men. The Second Battle of Bassano (6 November), the Battle of Caldiero (12 November), and Battle of Arcole (15–17 November) followed. Roselmini died in Vicenza on 19 November 1796, or two days after Arcole. The source did not state if he died from wounds suffered in the campaign or from natural causes.

Military offices
Preceded by Cajetan von Lichtenberg	Commander of Kaiser Infantry Regiment Nr. 1; 1789–1794	Succeeded by Ferdinand Nimptsch
