= Battle of Fombio =

1796 battle of the Italian campaign of 1796–1797

- Part of the Italian campaign of 1796–1797
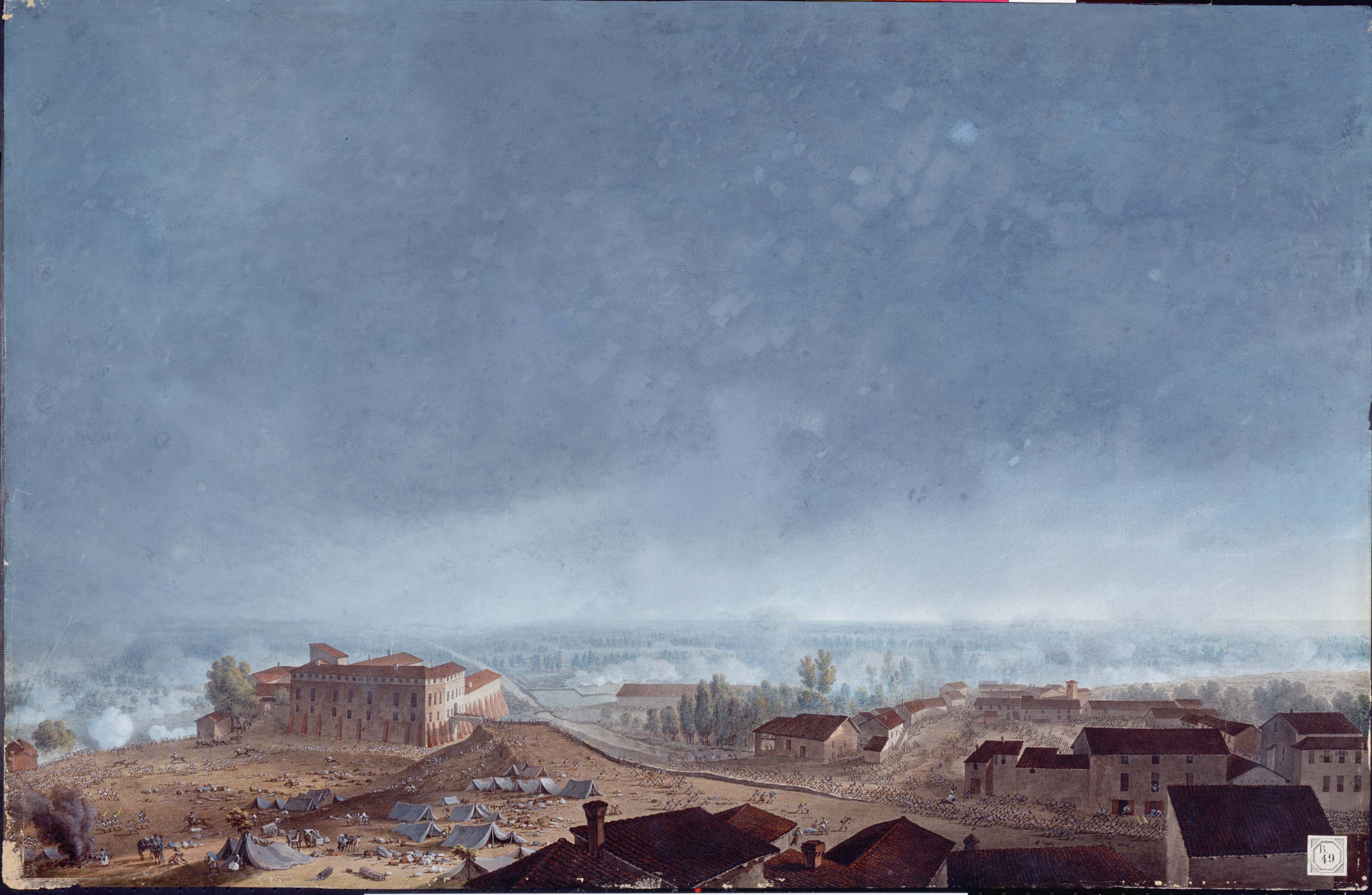
- Battle of Fombio; Giuseppe Pietro Bagetti, c. 1802–1806
Date	7–9 May 1796
Location	Fombio, Lombardy 45.1500°N 9.7000°E
Result	French victory

Belligerents
France	(Holy Roman Empire) Austria

Commanders and leaders
(France) Napoleon Bonaparte; (France) Amédée Laharpe †; (France) Claude Dallemagne	(Holy Roman Empire) Johann Beaulieu; (Holy Roman Empire) Anton Lipthay; (Holy Roman Empire) Anton Schübirz

Strength
11,500	Lipthay: 5,000; Schübirz: 1,580

Casualties and losses
450	1,568, 20 guns
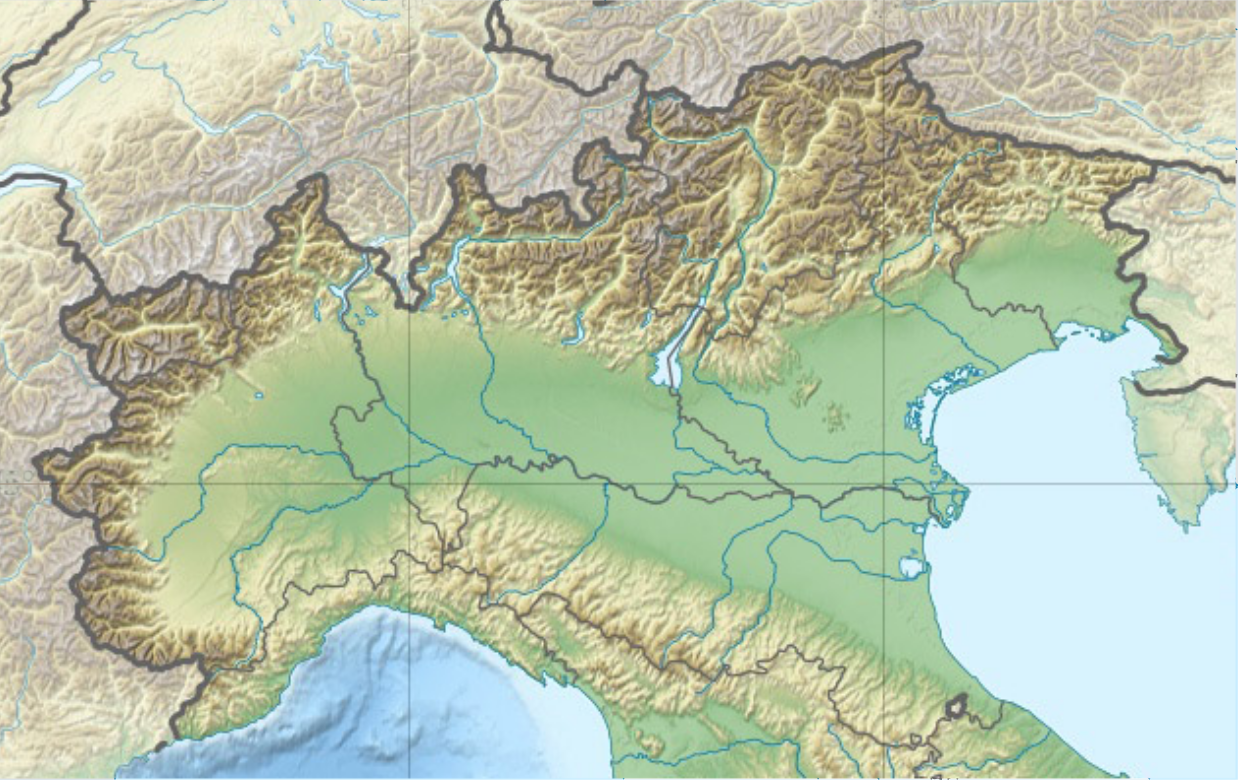
- Location within Northern Italy Battle of Fombio (Europe)

War of the First Coalition:
Italian Campaign
current battle
Napoleon as subordinate
Napoleon in command

The Battle of Fombio was fought between the French Army of Italy led by Napoleon Bonaparte and the Austrian army under Feldzeugmeister Johann Peter Beaulieu between 7 and 9 May 1796. It was the decisive strategic point of the campaign, as Bonaparte crossed the Po River at Piacenza in Beaulieu's rear, threatening both Milan and the Austrian line of communications. This threat forced the Austrian army to withdraw to the east.

== Campaign ==
After forcing the Kingdom of Sardinia-Piedmont to sue for peace at the end of the Montenotte Campaign, Bonaparte turned on the Austrians, who retreated to the north bank of the Po. The French army commander ordered General of Division Jean-Mathieu-Philibert Sérurier to launch a pinning attack on Beaulieu's positions near Valenza. Forming an advance guard of 3,500 grenadiers and 1,500 cavalry, Bonaparte placed it under General of Brigade Claude Dallemagne. Then he sent Dallemagne on a rapid march to the east along the south bank of the Po. The advance guard was followed by General of Division Amédée Emmanuel François Laharpe's division. Bonaparte intended to turn the Austrian left flank by crossing the Po near Piacenza.

== Battle ==
Early on 7 May, the advance guard seized a ferry near Piacenza and quickly crossed the river, Colonel Jean Lannes being the first Frenchman on the north bank. Soon both Dallemagne and Laharpe's commands formed a bridgehead on the north bank. General-major Anton Lipthay de Kisfalud's forces, which numbered 4,000 infantry and 1,000 cavalry, soon detected the French and several clashes occurred during the day. When Beaulieu heard about the incursion, he ordered General-major Josef Philipp Vukassovich to march from Valeggio to Lipthay's support and ordered his army to pull back in the direction of the Adda River. Meanwhile, General of Division Pierre Augereau got his 7,000 soldiers across the Po farther west by using a captured barge.

On the morning of 8 May, Dallemagne's advance guard, supported by Laharpe's 6,500-strong division, assaulted the village of Fombio. Colonels Lannes and François Lanusse led the advance guard's left and center columns while Dallemagne personally commanded the right column. At first Lipthay resisted stoutly, using his hussars to counterattack, but he decided to withdraw to avoid being trapped by the flanking columns. His Austrian and Neapolitan cavalry covered the retreat to Codogno. The French attacked Lipthay again in Codogno and the Austrians had to fight their way back to Pizzighettone, where there was a bridge over the Adda River. Lipthay's losses numbered 568 men on 7–8 May. According to one report, the French suffered 150 killed and 300 wounded in the first volley.

That evening, as Laharpe's 51st Line Infantry Demi-Brigade marched through Codogno, General-Major Anton Schübirz von Chobinin, with 1,000 foot soldiers and 580 uhlans attacked the town from the west. In one confused clash in the dark streets, Laharpe was killed, possibly by friendly fire. Bonaparte's chief of staff, General of Brigade Louis Berthier took charge and rushed two more demi-brigades into the fight before Schübirz withdrew about dawn on the 9th. Cut off from the bridge over the Adda at Pizzighettone, Beaulieu directed his retreating units to make for the bridge at Lodi, farther north. The Battle of Lodi followed on 10 May as Beaulieu tried to get his army safely behind the Adda and Bonaparte attempted to head him off.

== Bibliography ==
- Boycott-Brown, Martin. The Road to Rivoli. London: Cassell & Co., 2001. ISBN 0-304-35305-1.
- Chandler, David. The Campaigns of Napoleon. New York: Macmillan, 1966.
- Chandler, David. Dictionary of the Napoleonic Wars. New York: Macmillan, 1979. ISBN 0-02-523670-9.
