= Italian campaign of 1796–1797 =

Campaign of the War of the First Coalition

- Part of the War of the First Coalition
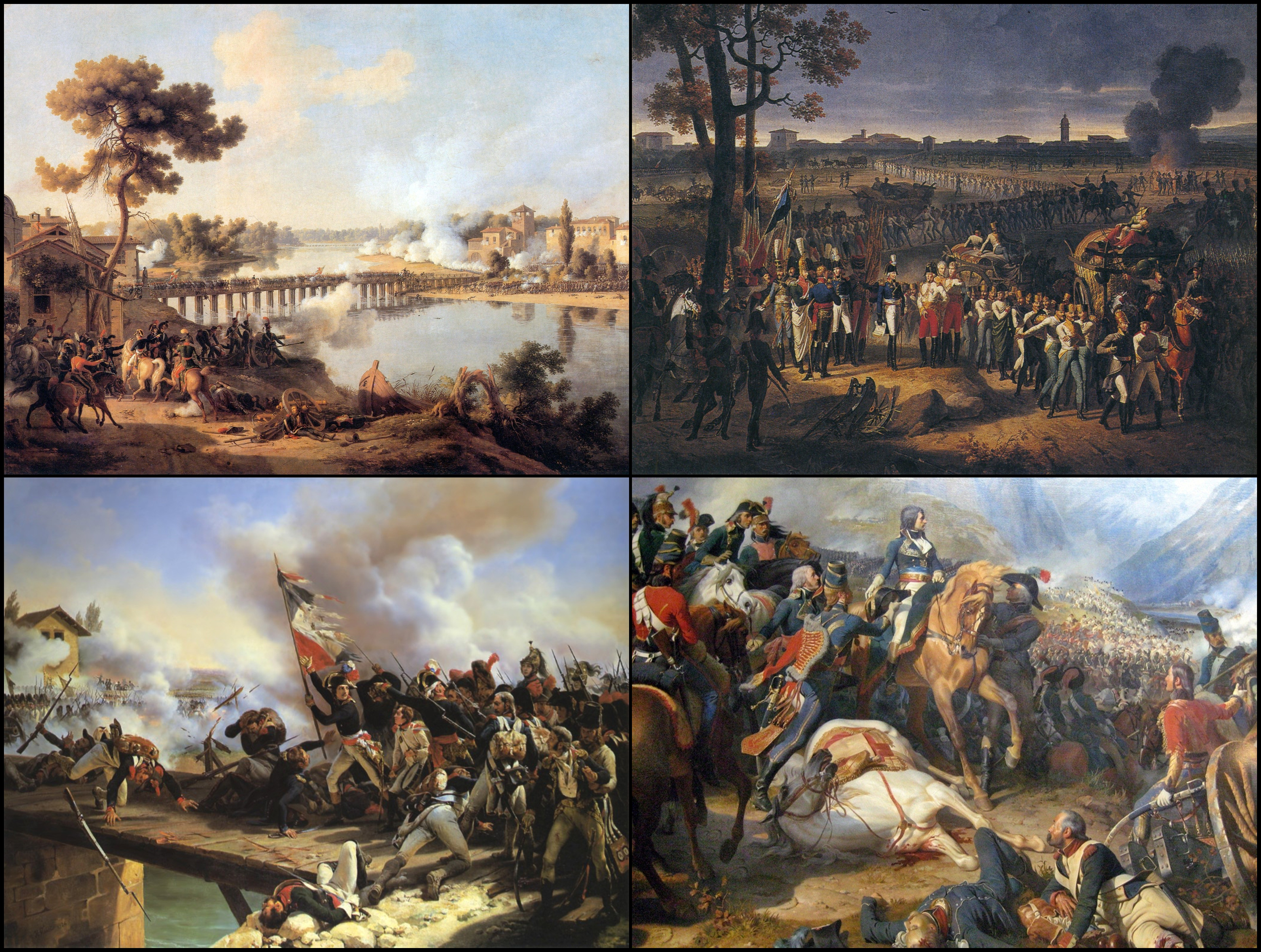
- Clockwise from top left: the Battle of Lodi, Siege of Mantua, Battle of Rivoli and Battle of Arcole
Date	10 April 1796 – 17 October 1797 (1 year, 6 months and 1 week)
Location	Northern and Central Italy
Result	French victory
Territorial changes	France gains direct control over Nice, Savoy, Piedmont, Lombardy, Emilia, and Romagna; Establishment of the Cisalpine Republic as a French client state; Austria gains direct control over Venice

Belligerents
France; Sister republics	Holy Roman Empire (Note: Nominally the Holy Roman Empire, under Austrian rule, also encompassed many other Italian states in addition to Piedmont, such as the Duchy of Modena, Grand Duchy of Tuscany, and the Duchy of Massa.); Piedmont-Sardinia; Papal States; Venice (de facto)

Commanders and leaders
(French First Republic) Napoleon Bonaparte	(Habsburg monarchy) Michelangelo Alessandro Colli-Marchi (Habsburg monarchy) Johann Peter Beaulieu (Habsburg monarchy) Dagobert Sigmund von Wurmser (POW) (Habsburg monarchy) József Alvinczi (Habsburg monarchy) Archduke Charles, Duke of Teschen

Units involved
39,600 (April 1796); 27,400 (October 1796); 44,000 and 78 guns (January 1797); 60,000 (February 1797)	54,500 (April 1796); 50,000 (June 1796); 59,000 (October 1796); 45,000 (January 1797); 50,000 (February 1797)

Casualties and losses
45,000 killed, wounded, or captured	27,000 allied soldiers killed 160,000 captured 1,600 guns 170 flags

The Italian campaign of 1796–1797 (Italian: Campagna d'Italia), also known as the First Italian Campaign, was a series of military operations in Italy during the War of the First Coalition. Led by Napoleon Bonaparte, the French First Republic's Army of Italy fought and defeated the armies of the Kingdom of Sardinia, the Habsburg monarchy, and the Papal States, as well as various revolts, notably in the Republic of Venice.

The campaign opened with the Montenotte campaign on 10 April 1796, where despite the limitations of his means, Bonaparte descended from the Alps into Italy and achieved a rapid series of victories that decisively knocked Piedmont-Sardinia out of the First Coalition. Next, Napoleon chased the Austrian army across Lombardy, culminating in the French victory at Lodi on 10 May 1796. After putting down revolts in Pavia and Milan, the focus of Napoleon's war in Italy shifted in June 1796 to the long and difficult siege of Mantua, which would see the French blockade the city and defeat four relief efforts by Austrian armies from August 1796 to January 1797. As he besieged Mantua, Napoleon also directed the French forces in a series of invasions of the states of Central and Northern Italy, such as of Modena and Reggio, Genoa, and the Papal States. In addition to these events, Napoleon would also conclude a Franco-Sicilian-Neapolitan treaty on 10 October 1796.

After the annihilation of the final Austrian relief force at Rivoli in January 1797, the weakened and starved garrison of Mantua finally surrendered on 2 February 1797; Bonaparte was not present at the surrender, as he was occupied with another invasion of the Papal States, resulting in the Treaty of Tolentino on 19 February 1797. Bonaparte next turned north from Italy, with a main force thrusting northeast and a secondary force invading the Tyrol. Although he fought his way over the Alps and had reached Klagenfurt by the end of March, the supporting offensive he expected by the French forces on the Rhine was slow to materialize and revolts developed in his rear. Rather than retreat, Napoleon opted to leave his lines of communication exposed and drive further into Austria as a show of force, which culminated with the Peace of Leoben on 18 April 1797. As part of the terms, Austria would receive Venice, resulting in Bonaparte dissolving the Republic of Venice on May 12, 1797.

Napoleon's campaign had seen the French achieve a series of decisive victories, establishing French domination over much of Northern and Central Italy. Although Napoleon had previous military experience, the campaign marked his first in command of a full army, and his victories led to great personal prestige and widespread popularity in France. Throughout the campaign, he independently exercised authority over conquered territories and established a series of sister republics under French domination. Although Napoleon often conflicted with or disregarded the directives of the French Directory, his victories across Italy and his march into Austria concluded the war victoriously for the First French Republic, and on 17 October 1797, he personally signed the Treaty of Campo Formio. This sanctioned the defeat of the Holy Roman Empire and the First Coalition and confirmed the predominance of French influence in Italy, especially on the peninsular elites.

== Background ==
=== General Bonaparte and the Army of Italy ===
Having advanced to the rank of brigadier general after having contributed to the victory of Toulon in 1793, Napoleon Bonaparte went to Nice to take up the new position of inspector of artillery in the Army of Italy (under the command of General Pierre Jadart du Merbion), where the two representatives of the National Convention, Augustin de Robespierre (brother of Maximilien) and Antoine Christophe Saliceti, were seconded, already with him during the siege of Toulon.

In the spring of 1794 the Army of Italy, already at war for two years with the Kingdom of Sardinia of Victor Amadeus III, was in a critical situation, with the troops blocked between the Piedmontese army to the north and the Royal Navy to the south, which blocked the maritime trade of the Republic of Genoa in concert with a Piedmontese naval team based in Oneglia. With the forces of Victor Amadeus III heavily entrenched around Saorgio, Napoleon deemed it the best thing to proceed quickly with the conquest of Oneglia, attacking simultaneously between the valleys of the Roia and Nervia rivers in the direction of Ormea and up to the Tanaro, all supported by a false attack against Saorgio. By doing so, contacts with Genoa would have been re-established, the Sardinian army would have been outflanked, forcing it to retreat and the Italian Army would have found itself in a more favorable position, controlling the mountain passes and close to the Piedmontese plains.

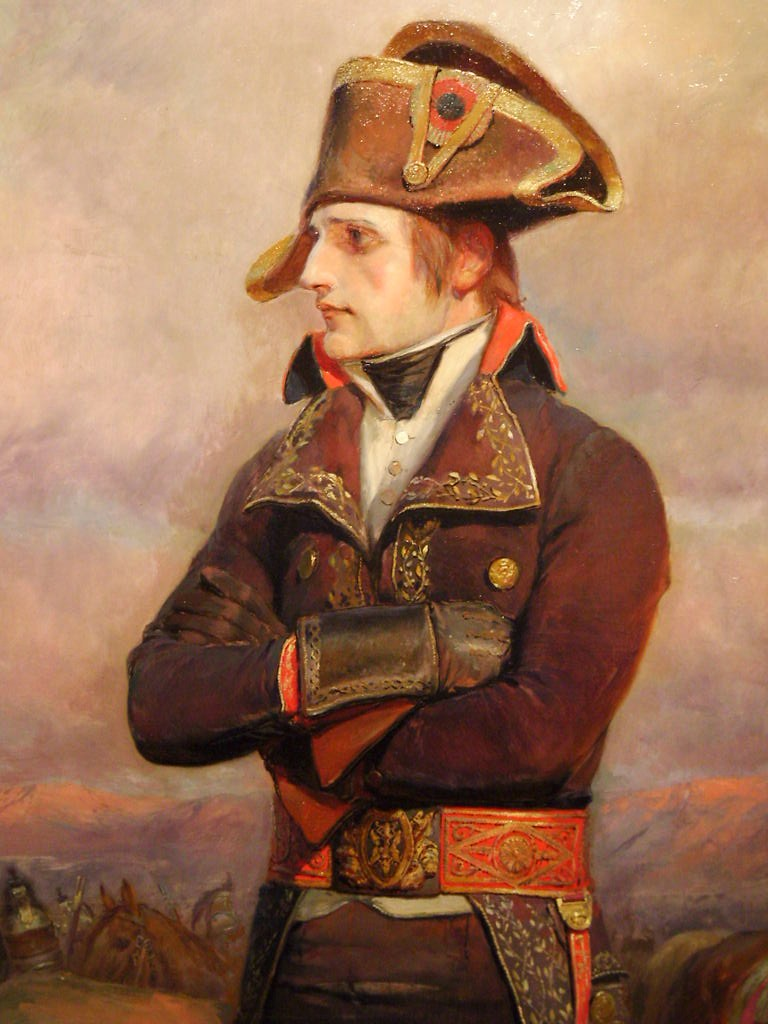
Bonaparte during the early stages of the campaign

Du Merbion entrusted 20,000 of his 43,000 men to Napoleon who immediately delegated the general of division André Masséna to attack on 16 April 1794. Masséna quickly conquered Ormea without encountering resistance, then turned west to cut off the retreat of the Austrians of Saorgio, who surrendered to Du Merbion's army which in the meantime had set out from Nice. Oneglia, Albenga and Loano fell along the coast, so that by May the French army had the Argentera, Colle di Tenda and Colle San Bernardo passes under control.

At this point Napoleon sent to Paris, through the representatives Robespierre and Saliceti, the plan for the second part of the offensive, which was to lead the French army to Mondovì, where the problems linked to the supply of soldiers that had been plaguing them for some time would be eliminated. Du Merbion's army, specifically the Army of Italy and the Army of the Alps should have proceeded eastwards, gathering near the well-defended Cuneo, while another column would have routed the Piedmontese around Colle di Tenda. The Minister of War Lazare Carnot and the Committee of Public Safety approved Bonaparte's plans and operations began on 5 June which immediately had positive developments. However, Carnot stopped any further steps forward to await developments on the Rhine front and avoid moving the soldiers too far from southern France, where a rebellion had recently been repressed. Robespierre himself traveled to Paris to dissuade the committee. While the debate was underway, a coup d'état on 27 July 1794 resulted in the death of Maximilien Robespierre and most of his supporters. Napoleon himself was implicated: he was arrested on 6 August by order of Saliceti due to the friendly relations he had with Augustin Robespierre.

The immobility into which the Army of Italy fell following the arrest of General Bonaparte forced Saliceti to exonerate him and give him support in his military initiatives; Austrian troops were also concentrating in the Bormida Valley to retake Savona. Napoleon immediately ordered the garrison of the Ligurian city to be strengthened and the representatives of the new Thermidorian Convention authorized the attack despite Carnot's veto still being in force. On 19 September 1794 the French went on the offensive, taking the Austrians by surprise who repaired to Dego, where they were narrowly defeated on 21 September.

=== Barras' decision ===
Napoleon, after being sent back to Toulon to participate in the invasion of Corsica, in May 1795 was assigned to an infantry brigade engaged in the repression of the rebel uprisings in the Vendée. Disappointed by these orders, he resigned but on 29 June, that is, eight days later, the Austrians pushed the 30,000 soldiers of the Italian army back to Loano, now under the command of François Christophe Kellermann who wrote to Paris that he was not certain of even being able to hold Nice. The facts forced the French government to recall Bonaparte as general of artillery, who was sent to the Bureau Topographique of the Ministry of War, a general staff of the French army. In July 1795 the Corsican general explained his ideas by declaring the reconquest of Vado Ligure and Ceva to be fundamental, these theses accepted and forwarded to the new commander of the Italian army, Barthélemy Louis Joseph Schérer.

The slowness of the 16,000 reinforcement soldiers meant that at the beginning of October, Schérer could only have 33,000 men at his disposal, but to his advantage there were disagreements between the commander of the 30,000 Austrian troops and general Michelangelo Alessandro Colli-Marchi at the head of the Piedmontese 12,000 strong contingent; such disagreement blocked any further advance of the two allied factions. Schérer divided his forces into three divisions: one under the command of Jean Mathieu Philibert Sérurier operating from Ormea, one under Masséna based in Zuccarello and another directed by Pierre François Charles Augereau stationed in Borghetto Santo Spirito. On 23 November the French began the offensive with Masséna victorious in the Battle of Loano but, due to the lengthening of the supply lines, Schérer lost the initial impetus and the Austrians managed on 29 November to set up a defensive line at Acqui.

The unstable political situation in Paris led to a new change in the staff of the Committee of Public Safety and, on 15 September, Napoleon was removed from the list of generals in actual service. Less than a month later the insurrection of the 13th of the year IV (5 October 1795) broke out led by the royalists who, at the head of 20,000 soldiers of the French national guard, marched towards the Tuileries palace, seat of the government which immediately delegated Paul Barras to resolve the complicated situation; Barras immediately asked Buonaparte for help who dispersed the rebels by giving the order to fire the cannons. Five days later, Napoleon was back in the ranks of the French army and on 2 March 1796 was entrusted with command of the Army of Italy.

=== Situation of the armies and French plan ===
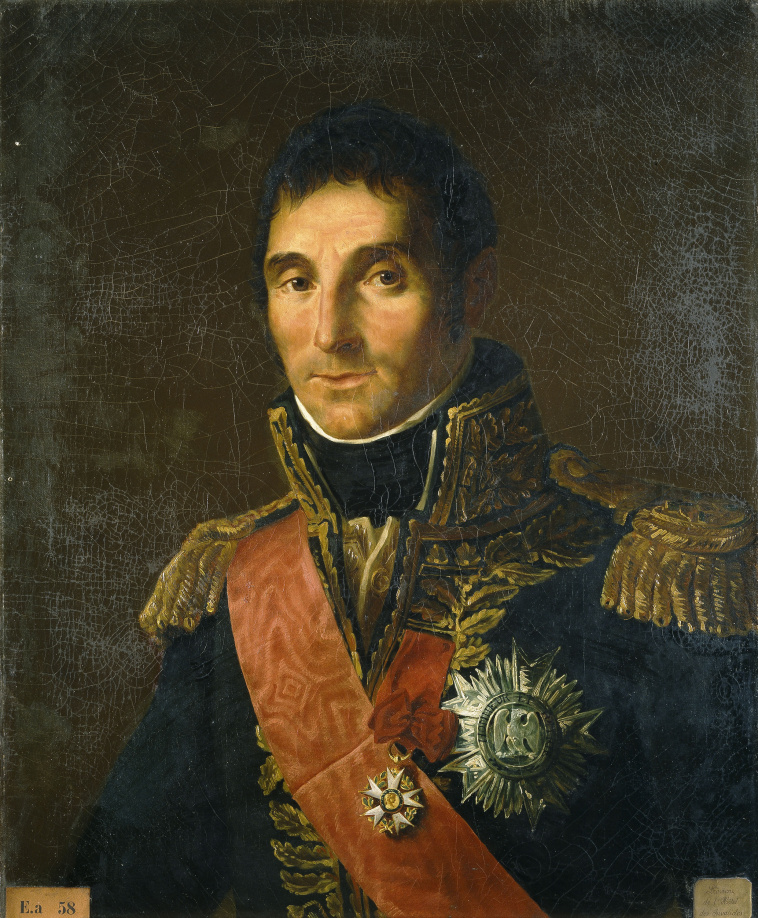
French General Andrea Massena, winner of the Battle of Loano

In 1790 the then-Holy Roman Emperor Joseph II had an army of 350,000 soldiers, 58,000 of whom were part of what was considered the best cavalry of the time. However, the composition was heterogeneous and reflected the vastness of Joseph II's dominions: in fact there were Austrians, Hungarians, Serbs, Croatians, Czechs, Slovaks and Italians under arms, with considerable communication problems. The tactics, as was the case for every other royalist army, were based on the concept of linear deployment which, if at the beginning gave good results against the undisciplined French troops, from 1796 had to give way against the genius of Napoleon. The attacks involved volleys of musket fire followed by infantry charges, and no capable artillery generals were available. The supreme command belonged to the emperor, the only authority superior to the courtly council made up of generals responsible for dictating strategies. The Austrians also trained the Sardinian army according to their own views, but mutual distrust reigned between the two allies, so much so that the court council had warned Johann Peter Beaulieu, supreme commander of the Austrian troops in Italy, to expect at any moment 'another betrayal. Beaulieu could have three armies for military operations: the first, under his direct control, numbered 19,500 soldiers, half of which were stationed around Alessandria; the second, under Argenteau headquartered in Acqui Terme, was strong with 15,000 men deployed between Carcare and the heights above Genoa; the third was under the orders of General Colli-Marchi and included 20,000 Sardinian soldiers located west of Turin, flanked by an Austrian detachment placed under General Giovanni Provera and deployed from Cuneo to Ceva and Cosseria. The total number of troops was ~54,500 men.

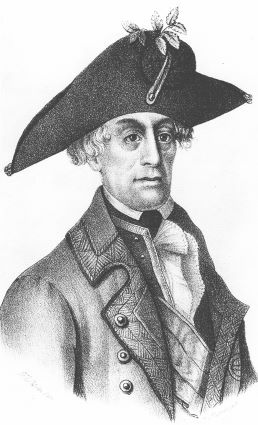
Johann Beaulieu, Austrian commander-in-chief who was succeeded after the Battle of Lodi by Dagobert Sigmund von Wurmser

A peculiarity of the French army was the speed of movement dictated by the limited resources available, which forced the soldiers to live at the expense of the occupied territories without the need for long cartloads of food in tow. In 1796 the Italian army was made up of approximately 63,000 personnel (compared to 106,000 in 1792), of which however only 37,600 were ready for immediate use, to which could be added the approximately 20,000 soldiers of the Army of the Alps (Armée-des -Alpes). These soldiers, however, were demoralized, dispersed along the coastal road from Nice to Savona, and dangerously exposed from the sea to the Royal Navy, from the hills to the Waldensian guerrillas and from the mountains to the Austrian army. The food ration deficit was chronic, while pay was several months late. Some demi-brigades hosted royalist councils and on 25 March 1796 two battalions had mutinied in Nice.

The plans of the Ministry of War envisaged that the Italian army would have to take possession of the Lombard plain and then continue up to the Adige river where they would go up the valley to cross the Alps after touching Trento, thus ending up in the Tyrol where, together with the general Jean Victor Marie Moreau, coming from the Rhine, would then go on to defeat the Austrian army and conquer Vienna. More concretely, the orders written by the War Ministry for Napoleon required him to push into the Milanese area with a secondary attack against Acqui and Ceva so as not to further antagonize the Piedmontese government, whose population was not entirely opposed to revolutionary ideas. However, Bonaparte considered the conquest of Piedmont indispensable and insisted so much that the Directory, on 6 March 1796, corrected the orders as follows:

"The situation requires that [...] we force the enemy to recross the Po, to therefore exert our maximum effort in the direction of Milan. It seems that this fundamental operation cannot be undertaken without the French army conquering Ceva as a preliminary move. The Directory leaves the commanding general free to begin operations by attacking the enemy in that area and, whether he achieves a complete victory there or the adversary has retreated to Turin, the Directory authorizes him to pursue him and attack him again and also to bomb the capital if circumstances require it. After having seized Ceva and having brought the left of the Italian army into the Cuneo area [...] the general [...] will direct his forces towards the Milanese area, essentially against the Austrians. He will have to repel the enemy beyond the Po [...] and will try to take possession of the fortresses of Asti and Valenza."

== Events ==
=== Sardinian defeat ===
On the same day he became commander-in-chief of the Army of Italy, 27 March 1796, Napoleon summoned the three most senior generals of division to his headquarters, through his chief of staff Louis Alexandre Berthier, to give them orders regarding the upcoming campaign. Jean Mathieu Philibert Sérurier, Pierre François Charles Augereau and Andrea Massena introduced themselves. Also present at the meeting were aide-de-camp Joachim Murat, Major Jean-Andoche Junot, Napoleon's brother Louis Bonaparte and Auguste Marmont. The start date of operations was announced as 15 April, in what for the War Ministry in Paris was a secondary front compared to that of the Rhine, the true backbone of the advance towards the ultimate objective, Vienna.

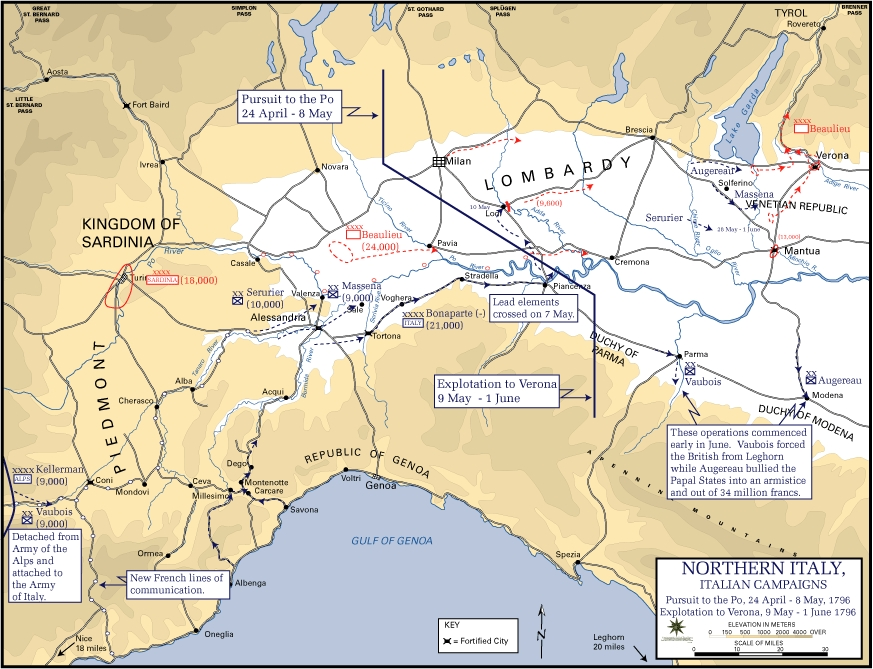
Advance of French troops across the Po river towards Verona

Napoleon moved his headquarters from Nice to Albenga and from there to Savona on 9 April. Having identified the weak link in the connection between the Austrian and Piedmontese armies in the city of Carcare, Napoleon aimed to conquer this position and then attack the now isolated Colli, leaving other units to face the Austrian Argenteau in Dego. Advancing towards the Colle di Cadibona seemed to be the best solution, because it allowed the French to quickly approach Carcare complete with artillery, without giving the opponent time to prepare for the defense. Napoleon then ordered Masséna's division to march to Cadibona and there join Augereau who, from Finale Ligure and through Tovo San Giacomo, was proceeding for a joint attack on Carcare. The attack would have been supported by a diversionary move by Sérurier in Ormea and by a move towards Cuneo by 6,800 soldiers under the orders of generals Francois Macquard and Pierre Dominique Garnier; furthermore, on the Mediterranean front, part of Amédée Emmanuel François Laharpe's division was tasked with attempting to conquer Sassello, while the rest of the men remained in close contact with General Jean-Baptiste Cervoni, constantly active around Voltri to make people believe it was imminent an assault on Genoa.

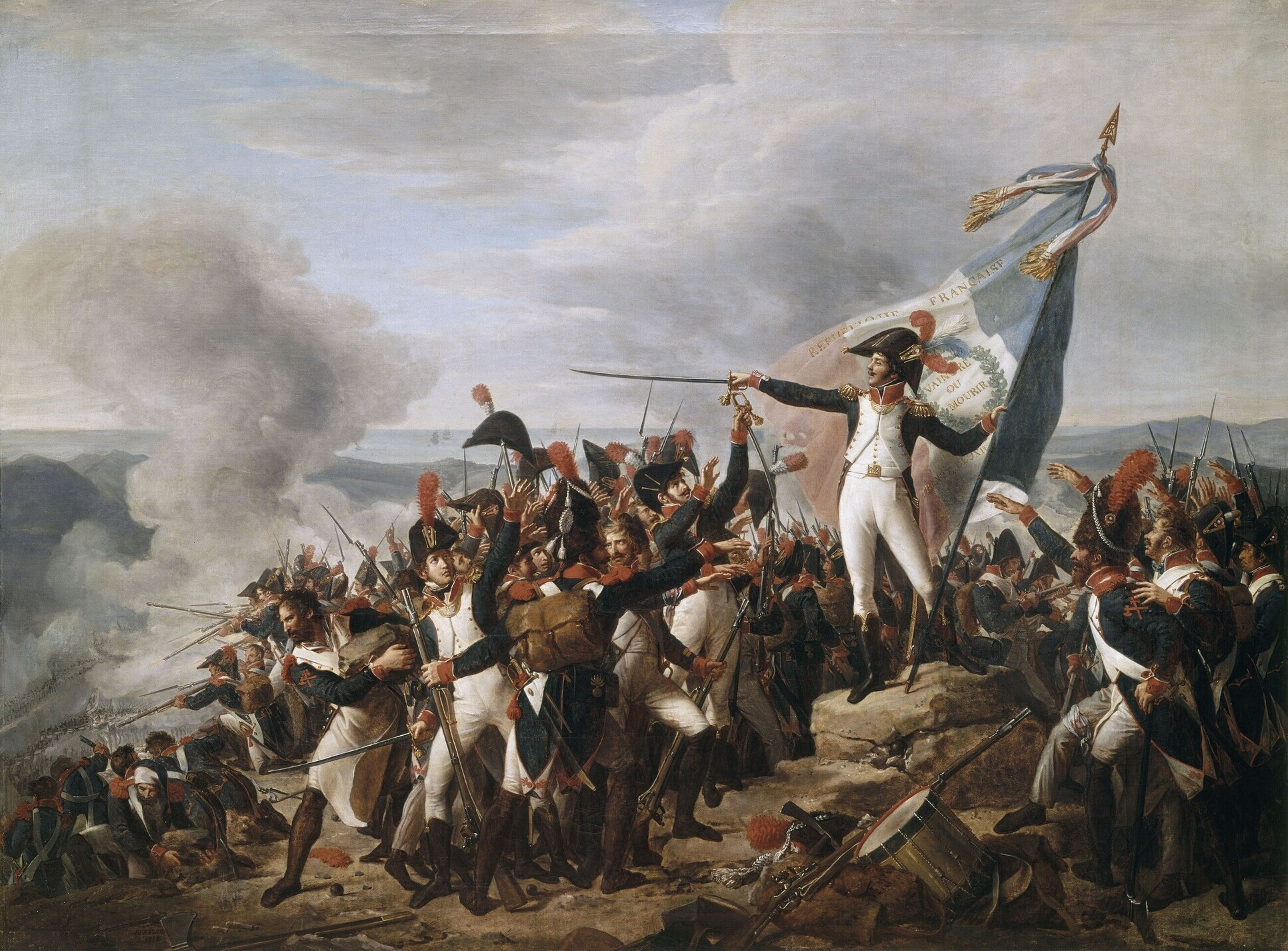
1812 painting of the Battle of Montenotte by René Théodore Berthon

In fact, an unexpected Austrian attack on Voltri forced Napoleon to bring forward the start of offensive operations by four days (11 April). In fact, Beaulieu, realizing the precariousness of Cervoni's brigade, ordered his men to advance in two columns through the Bocchetta Pass and the Turchino Pass to bypass Voltri, simultaneously with the moves of Argenteau who, from the hills, would have penetrated into Savona isolating Masséna and Laharpe; the bulk of the soldiers would then move to Alessandria and Val Bormida, where support for Colli and Argenteau would continue. Cervoni, having noticed his evident numerical inferiority, ordered the retreat and Napoleon started the attack plan, now knowing the position of Beaulieu, Voltri, therefore hypothesizing that this would take some time before being able to rescue Colli's Piedmontese. Furthermore, Argenteau only received his orders on 11 April, and before he could rally his troops, Laharpe and Masséna stopped his attempts at action on 12 April at the battle of Montenotte. The namesake campaign would be swift, lasting only two weeks, and signaled the surrender of the Piedmontese.

Due to a delay by Augereau, Masséna immediately had to march to Carcare, occupying the position before the Austrians. Together with the chief of staff Berthier, Napoleon decided that on 13 April Masséna would take Dego, with half of his men, blocking the Austrian communications, while the remaining half of the soldiers, supported by Augereau, would march against the Piedmontese at Ceva, with Sérurier arriving from Ormea. By doing so, the French commander in chief hoped to concentrate 25,000 soldiers to defeat the Piedmontese. Six battalions and all the cavalry under the command of General Henri Christian Michel Stengel would constitute the tactical reserve at Carcare. On 13 April the French found victory in the battle of Millesimo, but Augereau was stopped in Cosseria by 900 Austro-Piedmontese grenadiers perched in a castle, effectively blocking the view of Ceva.

Masséna also found himself hindered by a large group of Austrians in Dego, so that on 14 April Napoleon left only one brigade in Cosseria, sending reinforcements to Dego, which was occupied the following midday at the expense of 5,000 Austrians taken prisoner together with 19 cannons. In the meantime, news arrived of the surrender of the Cosseria garrison, but the event could not be exploited properly because Masséna's men dispersed to look for loot, being massacred by the Croatian Josef Philipp von Vukassovich.

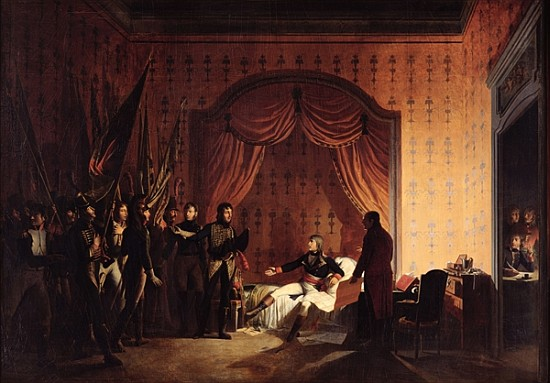
Bonaparte receiving captured Austro-Sardinian flags after the Battle of Montenotte

Once certain that his flank was secure, Bonaparte returned his attention to Ceva, where Colli's Piedmontese had repelled an attack by Augereau. Masséna was ordered to move towards Mombarcaro, from where it would be easy for him to break into Beaulieu's flank and rear in case he attempted to attack Dego; while everything was ready for a new attack against Colli, he retreated to a better position, in the corner formed by the confluence of the Tanaro river with the Corsaglia torrent. Napoleon then tried to get around the problem by ordering a frontal charge to Sérurier and Augereau to descend along the eastern bank of the Tanaro to attack Colli's flank; Augereau, however, was unable to find a ford and Sérurier, left without support, stopped his men. A new attack undertaken on 19 April had a similar unsuccessful fate, but on the same day the French opened a new supply route which, instead of passing through the Colle di Cadibona, went from the upper Tanaro valley to Ormea, thus giving the possibility to Napoleon to send men, taken from positions no longer strategically fundamental, against Colli, who however avoided another clash by retreating, on the night between 20 and 21 April, to Mondovì.

Pressured by the French cavalry (which however lost General Stengel in combat), Colli was immediately faced by Sérurier on 21 April in the battle of Mondovì, which ended with a defeat for the Piedmontese general. With the capture of the city, Napoleon had ensured access to its well-stocked deposits and, above all, the outlet into the fertile plain of Piedmont with a consequent drastic reduction in logistical difficulties. However, Piedmont was not yet defeated, so Napoleon advanced towards Turin on 23 April, but already that evening Colli asked for an armistice, which was accepted only after Masséna occupied Cherasco and Augereau Alba, thus completing the separation of the Piedmontese and the Austrians. On 28 April 1796, Vittorio Amedeo III signed the armistice of Cherasco, followed by the definitive Treaty of Paris on 15 May. In ten days of campaigning, and with the loss of 6,000 soldiers, Napoleon had defeated one of his two enemies in Northern Italy and had guaranteed the safety of his army's flank and rear.

The phase of fighting from 11 to 21 April 1796 marked a decisive turning point in the war and also in the career of the young general Bonaparte; the series of so-called "immortal victories" boasted by propaganda gave great prestige to the commander of the Army of Italy. The fighting had occurred every day until it became a single major battle that continued for ten days. The impetus and speed demonstrated by the French troops, brilliantly organized and directed by Bonaparte, had completely disoriented the enemy generals who had proven incapable of counteracting the new Napoleonic war.

=== Lodi Bridge ===
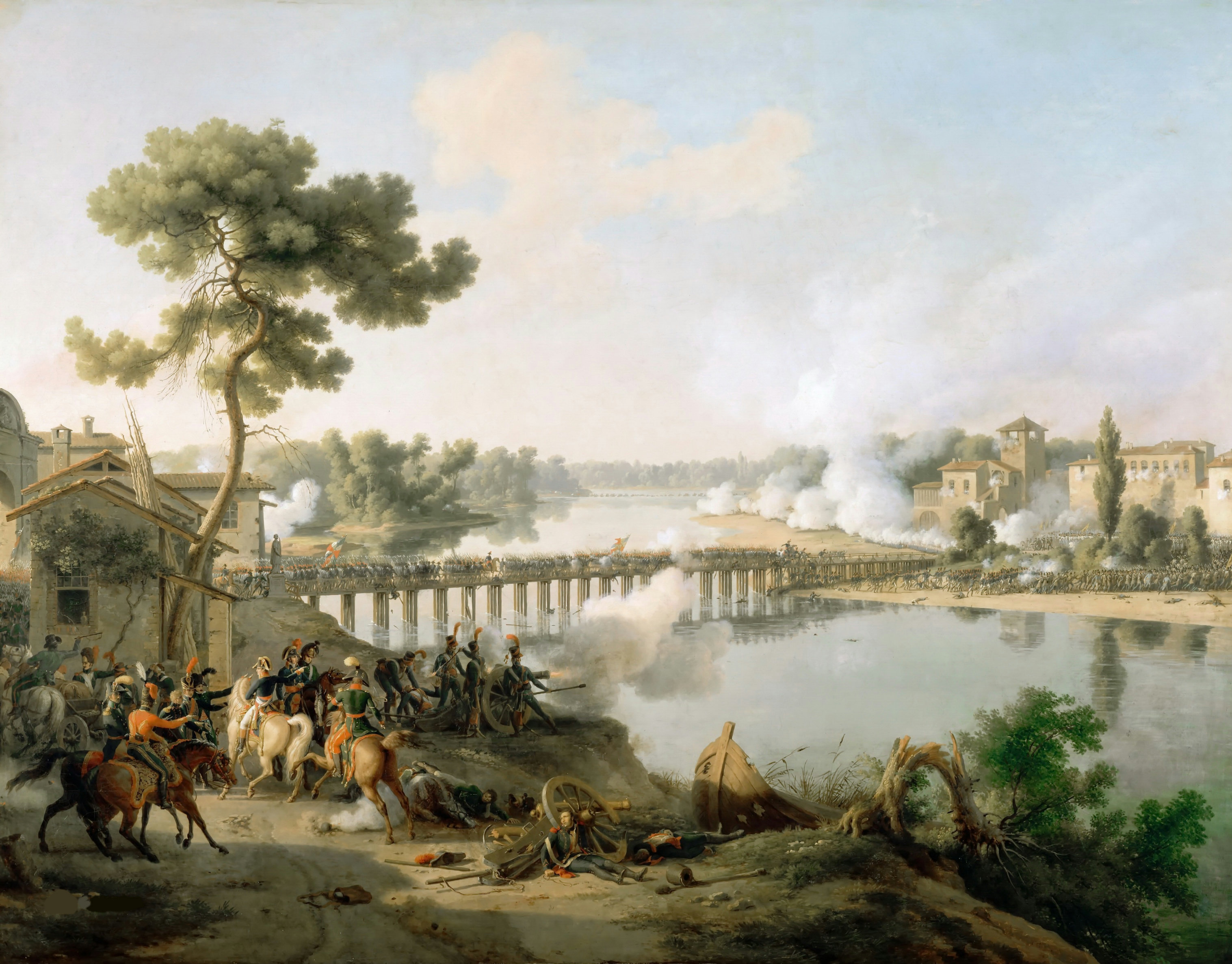
1804 painting of the Battle of Lodi by Louis-François Lejeune

After having forced the Kingdom of Sardinia to surrender with the victory at Mondovì, Napoleon Bonaparte had as his objective the destruction of the army of Beaulieu, commander in chief of the Austrian forces in Italy. Having given his men a short rest, Napoleon prepared to begin operations as soon as possible. A first step in this direction by the French general was to send his subordinate Laharpe towards Acqui Terme, headquarters of Beaulieu's command, on 28 April, but a mutiny due to the lack of food delayed his arrival until 30 April, when already a large part of the Austrians had saved themselves. Having failed in the objective, Napoleon and his 39,600 men concentrated between Tortona, Alessandria and Valenza, looking for a way to cross the Po in front of Beaulieu's army and therefore force it into a pitched battle. Taking advantage of the fact that the Austrian general was stationed in Valeggio instead of on the more distant Ticino river, Napoleon decided to cross the Po near Piacenza by means of an elite troop of 3,600 grenadiers and 2,500 cavalrymen under the orders of General Claude Dallemagne.

Dallemagne arrived in Piacenza at 09:00 on 7 May, and immediately began operations to cross the Po. By mid-afternoon Laharpe's division was also on the opposite bank, just in time to face the Austrian general Lipthay, already on 4 May active in occupying the bridges around Pavia and monitoring the fords to the east as ordered by Beaulieu, the latter not deceived by Sérurier's fake attempts to take Valenza and, indeed, immediately rushed to Lipthay's aid together with 4,500 Vukassovich's soldiers on May 7. In the meantime the French occupied Fombio and Augereau crossed the Po at Veratto; during the night Beaulieu's columns that were converging in the area clashed with the French troops near Codogno and, in the confusion, Laharpe was killed by mistake by his own men who, left without a leader, were saved by Napoleon's chief of staff Berthier and other of his subordinates, who took matters into their own hands by defeating the Austrians. These skirmishes led Beaulieu to order a general retreat to Lodi, on the Adda river, leaving Bonaparte free to complete the regrouping of the Army of Italy.

The French avant-garde arrived in sight of Lodi in the early hours of the morning of May 10, by which time the entire Austrian army was safe beyond the Adda protected by a rear guard of 10,000 men under the orders of General Karl Philipp Sebottendorf. This had placed three battalions and a dozen guns in positions that dominated the Lodi bridge and the access road. As soon as he returned from a reconnaissance in the area and easily took possession of Lodi, Napoleon deployed his cannons on the south bank and sent a contingent of cavalry under the command of Michel Ordener and Marc-Antoine Beaumont up and down the river to look for a ford and thus circumvent the enemy. The French grenadiers started the assault but towards the middle of the bridge they faltered, however the attack was immediately repeated with the direct participation of Masséna, Berthier, Dallemagne and Cervoni and this time the assault reached the other bank. A counterattack by Sebottendorf almost made the Austrians regain the bridge, but Masséna and Augereau's men cut short the action by breaking into the enemy lines, also hit by the providential arrival of Ordener's cavalry who in the meantime had found a ford. Sebottendorf immediately disengaged and retreated towards the main body of Beaulieu's forces.

The victory that Bonaparte achieved at Lodi could not be considered total; in fact Beaulieu managed to retreat with most of his troops. What dampened the enthusiasm was a message coming from the Paris Directory in which the decision was communicated to divide the command of the Italian army between Bonaparte and Kellermann, so as to assign the former the task of destroying the Pope and the latter to maintain control of the Po Valley. Napoleon responded in a displeased manner and in order not to risk receiving his resignation, the Directory assured him full confidence on 21 May 1796, and Kellermann sent 10,000 reinforcements. Five days after the battle of Lodi, Bonaparte entered Milan, where only a group of Austrians barricaded in the Sforza Castle resisted. Despite Napoleon's efforts to identify himself and his army with Italian nationalism, looting, plundering and taxes soon antagonized the Milanese, conversely providing French soldiers with about half of their back pay.

On 22 May, the day after hearing the news of the peace with Piedmont (Treaty of Paris of 15 May 1796), 5,000 French remained to besiege the Sforzesco Castle while another 30,000 set off again to stop Beaulieu, who in the meantime had positioned, in a rather dispersive manner, his 28,000 men beyond the Mincio, with their flanks covered by Lake Garda to the north and the Po to the south. Napoleon planned to break through the enemy lines at Borghetto sul Mincio, covering the attack with a feint on Peschiera del Garda. The movements were hampered by insurrections that broke out in Milan and Pavia, so Napoleon was forced to go back to regain control of the situation. On 28 May Bonaparte was in Brescia (which was territory of the Republic of Venice, whose neutrality had also been violated by Beaulieu) and two days later he drove the Austrians out of Borghetto sul Mincio, forcing them to fall back on the Adige; Augereau immediately moved towards Peschiera del Garda, Sérurier first towards Castelnuovo del Garda and then towards Mantua, while Masséna entered Verona. While Beaulieu was retreating towards Trento, the first siege of Mantua began, where 12,000 Austrians were trapped, and the second phase of the Italian campaign ended with Bonaparte now master of the Lombard plain and almost the entire Quadrilateral (with the exception of Mantua). The campaign, however, was far from over given that the Austrian army had not yet been forced to fight a decisive pitched battle, and was actually preparing for a counterattack given the French inactivity on the Rhine and in consideration of the fact that the lines of enemy communications had necessarily become longer. Napoleon therefore considered it a good idea to go on the defensive.

=== Fortress of Mantua – Castiglione and Bassano ===
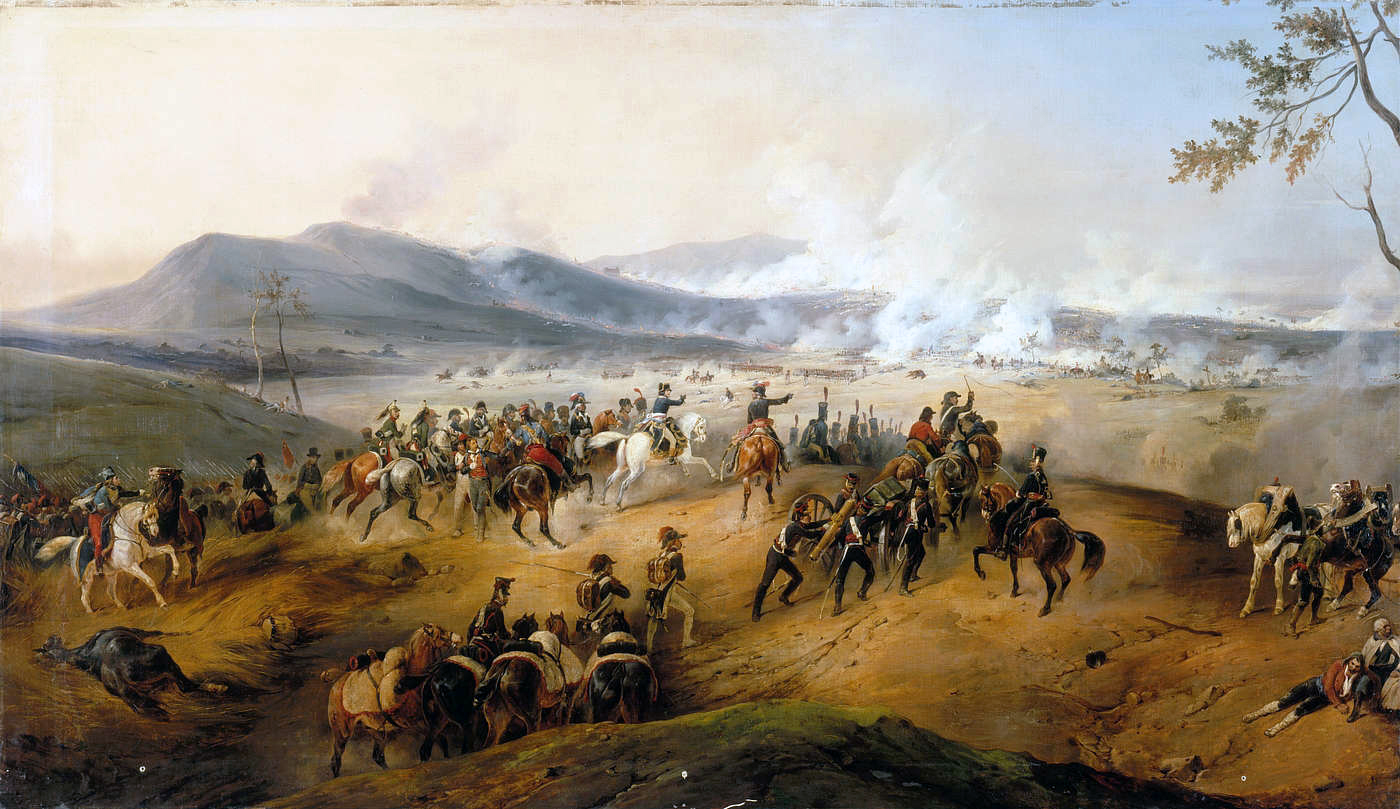
The Battle of Castiglione on 5 August 1796: under the guidance of Napoleon, Marmont deploys the artillery on Mount Medolano, while the central attack of Augereau's division begins in the plain below (painting by Victor Adam)

Napoleon ordered Sérurier to lay siege to Mantua on 3 June and then turned his attention to the Papal States of Pope Pius VI and the Grand Duchy of Tuscany of Ferdinand III. Together with Augereau and Vaubois, on 23 June Bonaparte took possession of the mighty Fort Urbano (a papal fortress located near the current Castelfranco Emilia), whose cannons were sent to Mantua after having persuaded the veterans of the Castello Sforzesco in Milan to surrender on 29 June; Florence and Ferrara spontaneously opened their doors to the French and Vaubois occupied Livorno, thus depriving the Royal Navy of a useful base in the Mediterranean; However, even before that Pius VI asked for and obtained the armistice of Bologna in exchange for the occupation of Ancona, Ferrara and Bologna and the payment of a large sum of money including some works of art.

The French, having successfully completed their incursion into central Italy, reconcentrated around Mantua, but the spectre of an Austrian counter-offensive coming from Tyrol convinced Bonaparte to lift the siege on the 31st of July, falling back to more suitable positions. The decision proved successful because the new Austrian commander in chief in Italy, Dagobert Sigmund von Wurmser, had managed to gather around 50,000 soldiers in Trento, with whom he began the advance towards Mantua. On July 29 the Austrian avant-gardes forced Masséna to retreat beyond the Mincio and abandon Verona while on the west side of Lake Garda, Peter Vitus von Quosdanovich conquered the town of Salò, coming to a halt in Brescia on 1 August due to the efforts of Augereau. The situation proved difficult for the French, threatened by the possibility of Wurmser and Quosdanovich reuniting their forces south of Lake Garda, gaining an overwhelming numerical superiority. However, Wurmser lingered from 30 July to 2 August near Valeggio sul Mincio to ensure the siege of Mantua was lifted, leaving time for the French to organize themselves and push back the two wings of the Austrian deployment separately: on the 3rd and 4 August Quosdanovich's columns were defeated by Masséna in the Battle of Lonato, while Augereau blocked Wurmser in Castiglione delle Stiviere. Masséna positioned to Augereau's left flank with a forced march, while Sérurier's division, after having driven a detachment of 4,000 Austrians back into Mantua, maneuvered to fall on Wurmser's flank, who was defeated at the Battle of Castiglione on the 5th of August. The culminating efforts of the French army forced Wurmser to retreat to the Tyrol.

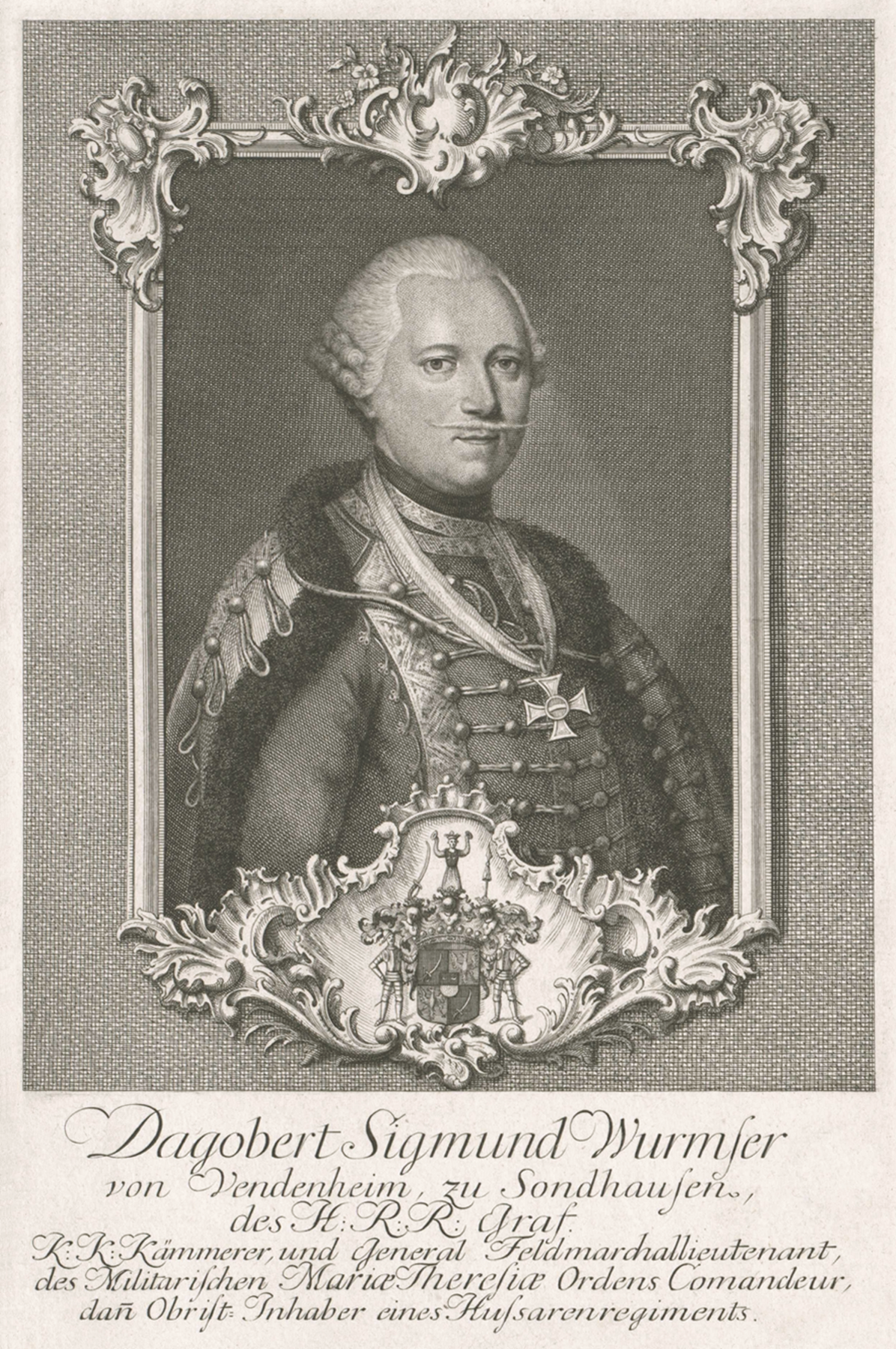
Dagobert Sigmund von Wurmser, Austrian commander-in-chief who succeeded Beaulieu after the Battle of Lodi

On 7 August Verona returned to French hands, Wurmser took refuge in Trento and Mantua, reinforced by two Austrian brigades, was once again besieged. Napoleon had managed, at the cost of 6,000 dead and wounded and 4,000 prisoners, to repel the first Austrian attempt to reconquer the Lombard plain, causing the enemy no less than 16,700 losses. The Directory deemed the time ripe to order the Italian army to pursue Wurmser as far as the Tyrol (as foreseen by the original strategic plan which wanted a simultaneous attack by Moreau and Bonaparte against Austria), but Napoleon proved skeptical about its actual implementation: the exhausting forced marches that had surprised and defeated Wurmser had worn out the Italian army, Mantua remained a danger for the rear, furthermore it was autumn, a non-optimal season for crossing the Alps. Despite this, the commander of the Army of Italy gave instructions to renew the offensive. General Sahuget was appointed commander of the siege of Mantua together with 10,000 men, Kilmaine was placed to guard Verona and the lower Adige against a possible Austrian attack coming from Trieste, while the last 33,000 soldiers, commanded by generals Vaubois, Masséna and Augereau, would continue to Trento trying to meet with Moreau on the Lech river.

A part (19,000–20,000 men) of Wurmser's army, still disciplined overall, prepared to once again follow the orders of its commander, who had in turn received instructions directly from Vienna to once again attempt to liberate Mantua; the plan that was to be implemented would be a descent along the Brenta valley to the Adriatic, leaving General Paul Davidovich with 25,000 soldiers to protect Trento and Tyrol. With this deployment of the Austrian forces, Masséna and Vaubois, in full advance, defeated 14,000 of Davidovich's Austrians in the Battle of Rovereto. Only at this point did Napoleon have confirmation of Wurmser's moves on the Brenta, but he adopted an unexpected and risky solution: instead of retreating along the Adige, as the Austrian generals expected, he sent Vaubois and 10,000 of his men to block the northern approaches to Trento, and sent the remaining 22,000 soldiers in pursuit of Wurmser along the same route that the Austrians had followed. Napoleon calculated that Wurmser, with the lines of communication blocked, would have to accept a battle or retreat to the Adriatic, in any case leaving the garrison that was besieging Mantua in peace. On 6 September the French plan came to fruition and already on 7 September Augereau forced the Austrian defenses at Primolano, reaching Cismon del Grappa in the evening after a rapid march that caught the Austrian commander in chief off guard. On 8 September the Austrians were routed by the French infantry and cavalry in the Battle of Bassano, remaining divided into two sections, one retreating towards Friuli and the other (about 3,500 men with Wurmsers reinforced by General Mészáros' 16,000 men), against Bonaparte's predictions, stubbornly marching on Mantua.

Facilitated by Kilmaine who had withdrawn some garrisons guarding the Adige to prevent the capture of Verona by Mészáros, Wurmser crossed the Adige without problems on 10 September. Masséna and Augereau were once again forced to impose on their respective men backbreaking forced marches to cut off the Austrians before they came into contact with the troops besieged in Mantua, but Wurmser forced the French blockade and, on 12 September, crossed the gates of Mantua, bringing the garrison to 23,000 soldiers who on the following 15 September also tried to definitively lift the siege with a sortie, this time contained by Masséna and Sahuget. The second Austrian attempt to liberate Mantua ultimately proved to be a failure because Wurmser had locked himself in a trap, furthermore the increased number of mouths to feed worsened the already precarious food situation of the besieged.

=== Caldiero and Arcole ===
After the developments of September, the French forces in Italy enjoyed a period of relative respite. In this time, the French army, with 14,000 sick and 9,000 men quartered around Mantua out of a total of 41,400 effectives, was positioned by Napoleon in such a way as to prevent new Austrian attacks: Vaubois's division (about 10,000 men) lined up at Lavis in the Adige Valley at the crossroads with Val di Cembra to block access to Lake Garda and Masséna occupied Bassano del Grappa; Kilmaine was placed at the head of the garrison besieging Mantua, as Sérurier was still ill, while the headquarters was established in Verona, supported by Augereau's division as a reserve.

The strategic reality was more complex, and Napoleon could not focus solely on the Austrians; the demands of the French on local states for war contributions created widespread discontentment, and many Italian states, led by the Pope, were already conspiring to expel the French from the peninsula. The Pope planned for 30,000 Neapolitans to fight Bonaparte, and courted Sardinia, Modena, and Venice to join. In the event, however, Napoleon struck first. He occupied the Duchy of Modena and Reggio, installed a military base in Genoa, overawed Venice with military demonstrations, and concluded on 10 October a Franco-Sicilian-Neapolitan treaty, isolating the Pope. Furthermore, on 15 October the Transpadane Republic was born in Milan, immediately followed by the Cispadane Republic, with which it merged in June 1797 to create the Cisalpine Republic; these efforts, however, engendered hostility, and could not ensure by themselves the political stability of Bonaparte's position in Italy. To add to Bonaparte's problems, his successes thus far inspired much jealousy among the civilian officers following the army, who sent damning reports to Paris that his goal was to become the King of Italy; despite the power and prestige he had earned up to this point, Bonaparte was unlikely to survive a military setback.

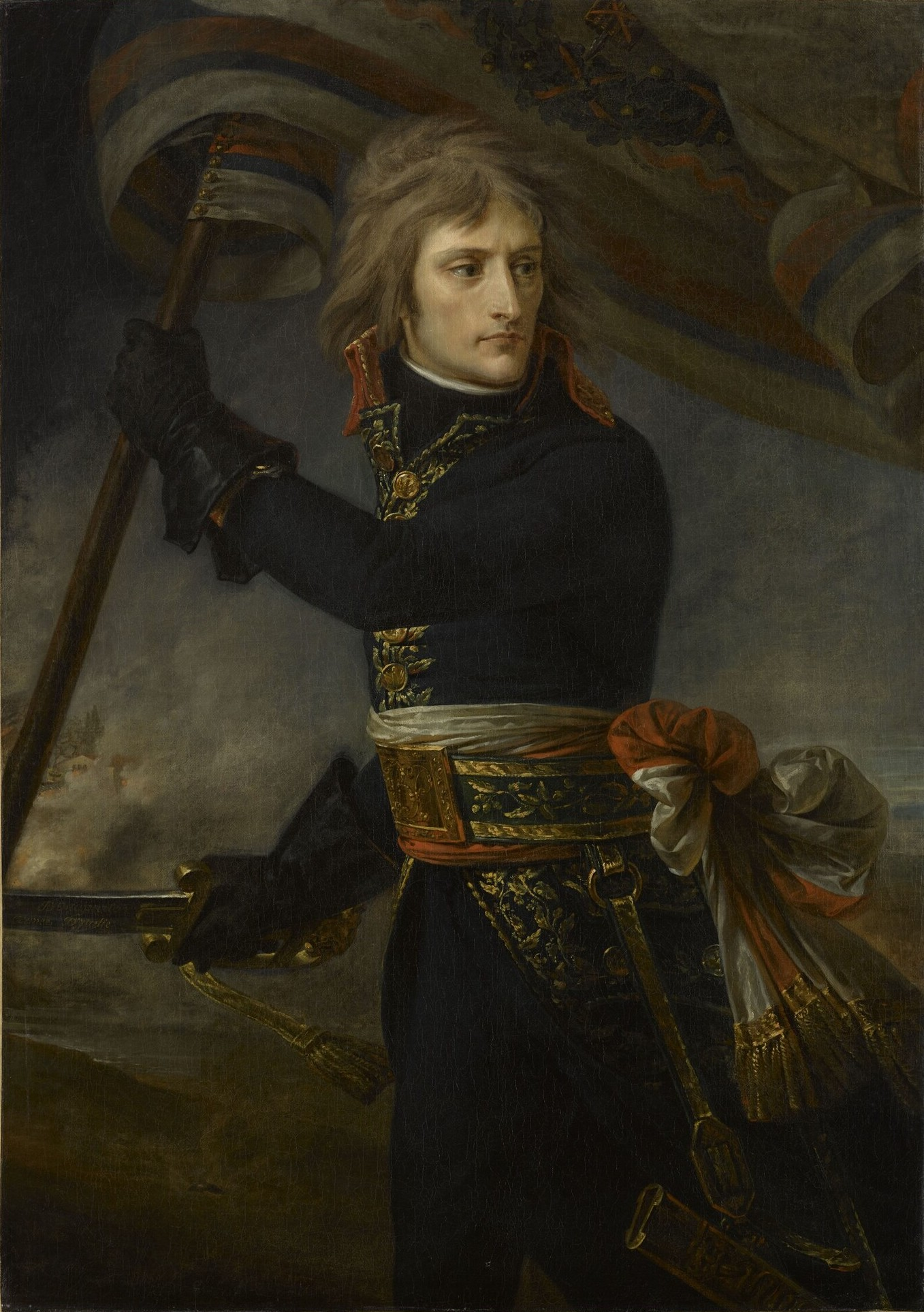
Napoleon at the Bridge of Arcole, as depicted in a painting by Antoine Jean-Gros

The lull in Italy was broken by developments on the Rhine, where the Austrians under Archduke Charles had beaten the French forces back to the west bank of the Rhine. The French failure on the Rhine front had drastic consequences for Napoleon, as it signaled the focus of the Austrians away from the German theater and onto the war in Italy. By the beginning of November, a new force of 46,000 Austrians was ready for an offensive into Italy. Led by the new Austrian commander-in-chief, Joseph Alvinczy von Berberek, and General Davidovich, the Austrians planned to use Napoleon's scattered forces to their advantage. Their objectives were first of all Trento and Bassano del Grappa, then the army, initially divided into two columns, would reunite in Verona, from where it would continue to Mantua. Mechanisms were set in motion to deceive Napoleon that the only threat was represented by Alvinczy's 28,000 men marching on Bassano, hoping that at the right moment an attack by Davidovich on Trento would send the Italian army into panic. Napoleon's options would be further limited by the over-sized 23,000-strong garrison in Mantua, which he could not afford to ignore.

When the Austrian columns set out on the march in early November, Alvinczy was pleased that Bonaparte moved Vaubois to Trento to eliminate the, in his opinion, weak advancing enemy units; however, when the first reconnaissance reports reached the French, the size of the enemy became clearer to Napoleon. He therefore immediately changed his plans by ordering Vaubois to hold the position as much as possible until Alvinczy had been defeated, who in the meantime, on 6 November, had managed to repel Masséna both at Fontaniva and at Bassano del Grappa also reinvigorated by taking Trento and Rovereto which Vaubois had failed to defend, stopping the Austrian advance only at Rivoli Veronese. Faced with this situation, Napoleon ordered Masséna and Augereau to take a more secure position behind the Adige, and took two brigades from Mantua to reinforce Vaubois's units.

Davidovich's inexplicable inactivity from the 7th to the 9th of November encouraged Bonaparte to attempt an attack on Alvinczy's right flank with 13,000 men on 12 November at Caldiero, which ended in defeat. The last chance to avoid the reunion of the Austrian armies with a consequent probable loss of the Italian possessions was to beat, with the last 18,000 soldiers of Augereau and Masséna, the 23,000 of Alvinczy in a decisive battle. Napoleon put together a plan to take Villanova di San Bonifacio, thus hoping to engage in battle with Alvinczy in the marshy area between the Alpone and Adige rivers, nullifying the Austrian numerical superiority.

On November 14, Alvinczy's vanguards arrived in sight of Villanova. The following day Augereau and Masséna's units occupied the village of Porcile but Augereau failed in his objective of crossing the Alpone and conquering Villanova because he was pinned down by Austrian fire at the Arcole bridge. Napoleon, realizing that any delay would make trapping Alvinczy less likely, brandished a French tricolor and put himself at the head of his men in a desperate attack on the Arcole bridge. The Austrians repelled this too, and Napoleon fell into a ditch, from which he was saved by his aide-de-camp. The French did not conquer Arcole until seven in the evening, and even this success was nullified by the worrying news sent by Vaubois, who announced that he had been pushed back as far as Bussolengo. Napoleon consequently took the difficult decision to abandon Arcole to redeploy on the Adige, in the event of having to hastily rescue Vaubois. On the morning of the 16th the French, having noted Davidovich's inactivity against Vaubois, attempted again to occupy Porcile and Arcole (which returned to Austrian hands during the night), but managed to take possession, after a whole day of fighting, only of the first location. As on the day before, Napoleon, when evening arrived, withdrew all his soldiers to the Adige, in case they were needed to help Vaubois.

On the 17th, with still no news from Vaubois's front, the French at Arcole launched themselves for the third time against the Austrians, whose forces were now separated into two sections, with about a third of the soldiers located in the marshy area under the orders of Provera and Hohenzollern. To deal the final blow to the enemy, Bonaparte ordered an attack against the main body of Alvinczy's forces. The Austrians, pushed back, had to surrender a part of Arcole after a bayonet clash with the French. To exploit the situation, Napoleon gathered four trumpeters and a small number of "guides" (his bodyguard) with the aim of deceiving the enemy. Unseen, the small detachment crossed the Alpone and, thanks to the sound of musical instruments, he simulated the approach of a large unit right behind the Austrians headquartered in Arcole, who immediately retreated northwards, convinced of an imminent heavy attack by French forces. Thanks to this stratagem, the units blocking Augereau disbanded, giving the French general the opportunity to reunite with Masséna in a free Arcole, from where, together with the soldiers coming from Legnago, they spread into the surrounding areas. Alvinczy, faced with what seemed to him a serious threat to his rear, ordered the entire army to retreat towards Vicenza.

At the cost of 4,500 deaths in three days of fighting, Napoleon had definitively crushed Alvinczy's attempt to reunite with Davidovich. With 7,000 fewer men dead at Arcole, Alvinczy barely managed to return to Bassano. With Alvinczy beaten, Napoleon immediately swiveled his forces to Vaubois's aid, ordering Augereau to force-march to Dolce with the aim of trapping Davidovitch. Davidovitch, who had by then beaten Vaubois to Castelnuovo, abandoned his gains and made good his withdrawal, but at the cost of 1,500 men captured, nine guns, two bridging trains, and most of his baggage. With Davidovitch defeated, Alvinczi finally withdrew back up the Brenta, bringing the third Austrian relief effort to a close.

=== Rivoli and fall of Mantua ===
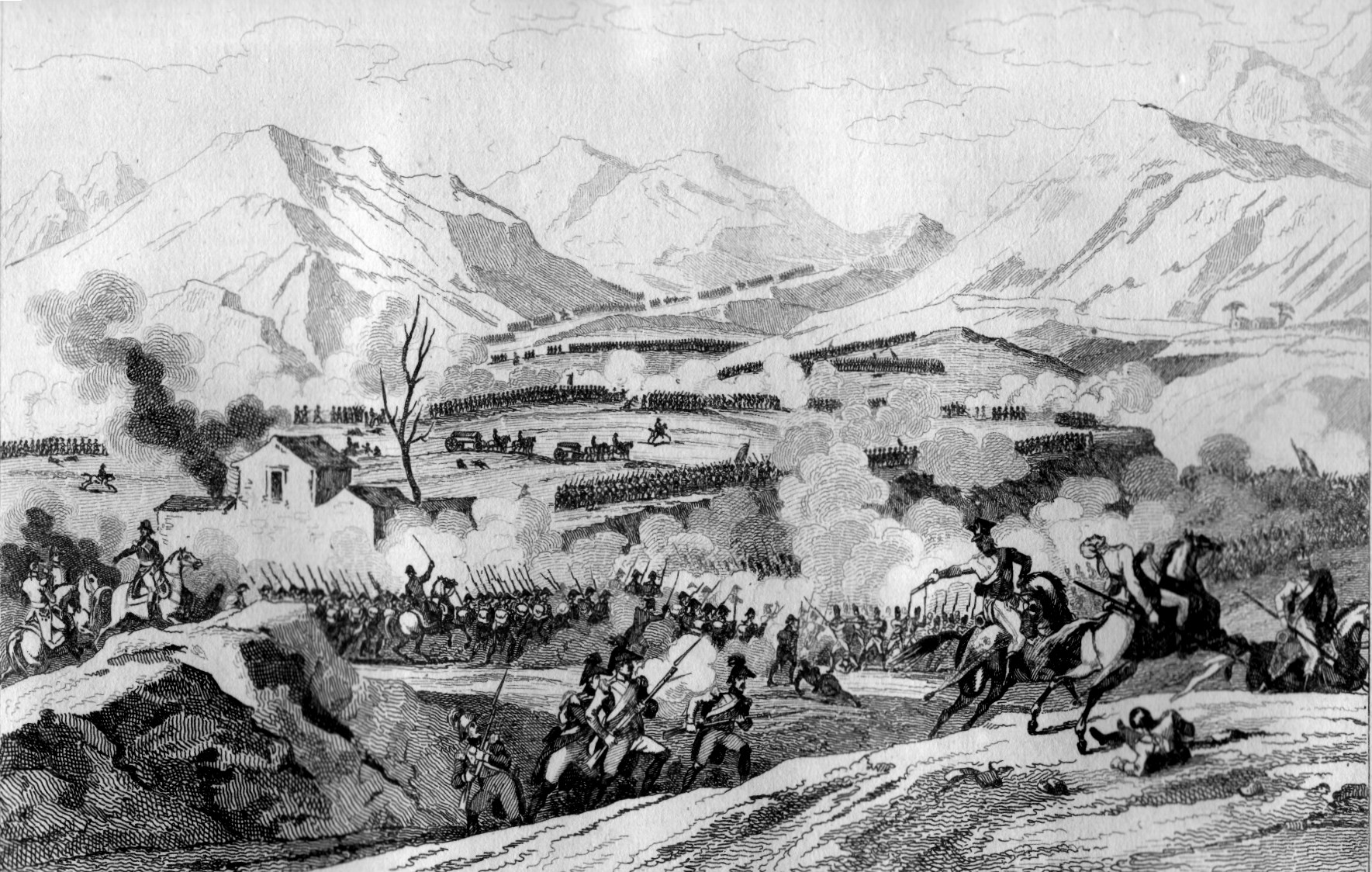
Scene of the Battle of Rivoli, following which the French held Northern Italy

At the end of November, the French government decided to broker a peace with the Austrians. General Clarke was appointed representative of the Directory and initiated the first diplomatic initiatives with Emperor Francis II. However, these peace attempts collapsed over the Austrian demand that they be allowed to re-supply Mantua even as negotiation was ongoing, which the French found inconceivable.

With the beginning of 1797, Napoleon was able to deploy 34,000 men on the Italian front (in addition to the 10,000 engaged in the siege of Mantua) and 78 field guns against Alvinczy, who could deploy 45,000 (in addition to the over-sized garrison in Mantua). Alvinczy's forces struck first, with the French forces at Legnago, Verona, and La Corona all coming under attack from 7 January to 12 January. After correspondence with Joubert on 13 January, Napoleon identified Rivoli, to which Joubert had retreated from La Corona, as the key point of the clashes with the other two attacks as feints. He ordered Joubert to hold firm, and Masséna and Rey to march toward Rivoli, where Alvinczy had indeed converged his main force of 28,000 men.

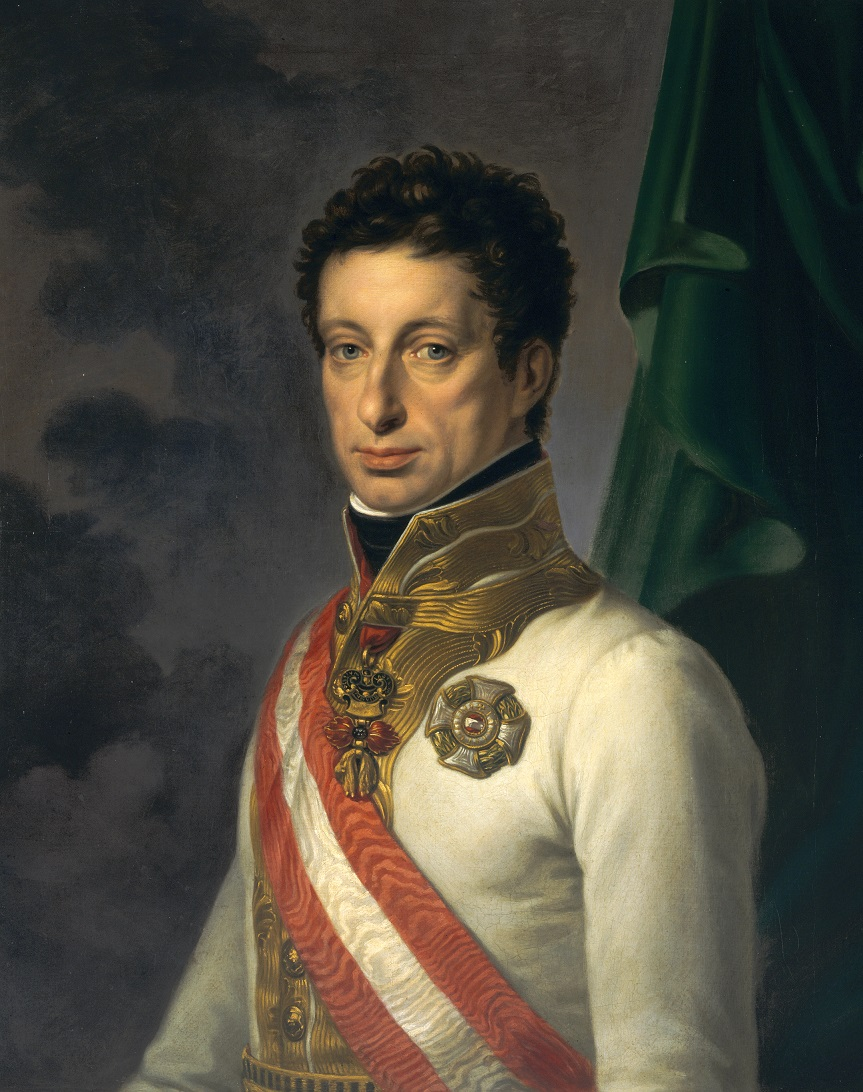
Archduke Charles of Habsburg-Teschen, the last Austrian commander-in-chief in the campaign

Alvinczy had not exploited the victory he had achieved over Joubert, and divided his army into six columns under the command of generals Quosdanovich, Lusignan, Lipthay, Köblös, Ocskay and Vukassovich. For the 14th, he prepared an intricate battle plan where Lipthay, Köblös, and Ocksay would assault the French from the north, with Lusignan and Wukassovitch outflanking the French from both sides, and Quosdanovich storming up the Osteria gorge. The complexity of this plan, however, would be difficult to coordinate. Napoleon meanwhile joined Joubert on the night of the 13th, with the forces he ordered to march to Rivoli not expected until the following day. All available men were sent to garrison the terrain in front of the central Austrian positions and the village of San Marco, which was a key position for holding the Osteria gorge.

At dawn on the 14th, Joubert attacked the Austrian columns before them, only to be repelled by Köblös and flanked by Liptay. Masséna's reinforcements plugged this gap, although to the south of the French position Lusignan completed his wide outflanking march, which cut Bonaparte's line of retreat. Napoleon diverted forces to Lusignan, but the French position further worsened as the Austrians had seized formidable positions dominating the Osteria gorge while the French were focused on the battle in the north. By eleven in the morning, the Austrians had fought the French out of Osteria and appeared poised to break through Joubert. At this moment, Napoleon suddenly swung Joubert's brigades from fighting Köblös and Liptay in the north to the east, and blasted the Austrian attack from Osteria with an artillery battery at point-blank range. The French cannonade, ripping through the packed Austrian forces, landed a lucky shot that erupted two Austrian ammunition wagons, and a French charge through the ensuing chaos beat back the Austrians in the east for good. In the north, Köblös and Liptay were still at large, so Napoleon swung the forces which had just won Osteria back into battle, and in this manner the French too repelled the attack from the north. Lusignan, caught between the victorious French forces to his north and fresh French reinforcements approaching from his south, also retreated.

Satisfied that the situation in Rivoli was completely under French control and knowing the Austrians under Provera were about to cross the Adige at Angiari, Bonaparte left the pursuit of Alvinczy's defeated forces to Joubert and rushed south to direct the operations around Mantua. Joubert, on 15 January, finally repelled the three central Austrian columns at the La Corona position, whose retreat was cut off by Murat and Vial who controlled the mountain passes in their rear. On the same day, Provera managed, not without losses, to arrive near Mantua, but was stopped by Sérurier's soldiers who were surrounding the city. On 16 January the last sortie of the old general Wurmser was a failure, and in the afternoon the arrival of Napoleon and Augerau surrounding Provera and forcing him to surrender caused the end of the Austrian attempts to liberate Mantua in the Battle of La Favorita. The city finally surrendered, with the honor of arms, two weeks later on 2 February 1797.

The fall of Mantua sealed French control of northern Italy. On the same day that Sérurier watched Wurmser parade out of Mantua, Bonaparte gathered 9,000 men with whom he presented himself in Romagna, forcing Pius VI to sign the Treaty of Tolentino, with which France secured a large sum of money to continue the war against Austria and the region of Romagna ceded from the Papal States. As for the Austrians, they had been beaten, but not completely defeated; Archduke Charles of Habsburg-Teschen was in fact gathering the army again to face the French.

=== March on Leoben ===
In February 1797 the Directory, given the developments in Italy, changed its strategy by assigning men and resources to Napoleon to the detriment of the German front, placing hopes of a happy end to the war in the Corsican general. However, it was not Bonaparte's plan to wait for Archduke Charles to gather another 50,000 soldiers in Friuli and Tyrol. The French general, who now had 60,000 men, left 10,000 under Joubert's command in Tyrol in the event of an enemy attack, even if the primary objective was to advance in two columns (Joubert and Napoleon, respectively, marching along the Avisio valley and Friuli) which would have joined in the valley of the Drava River to converge together towards Vienna.

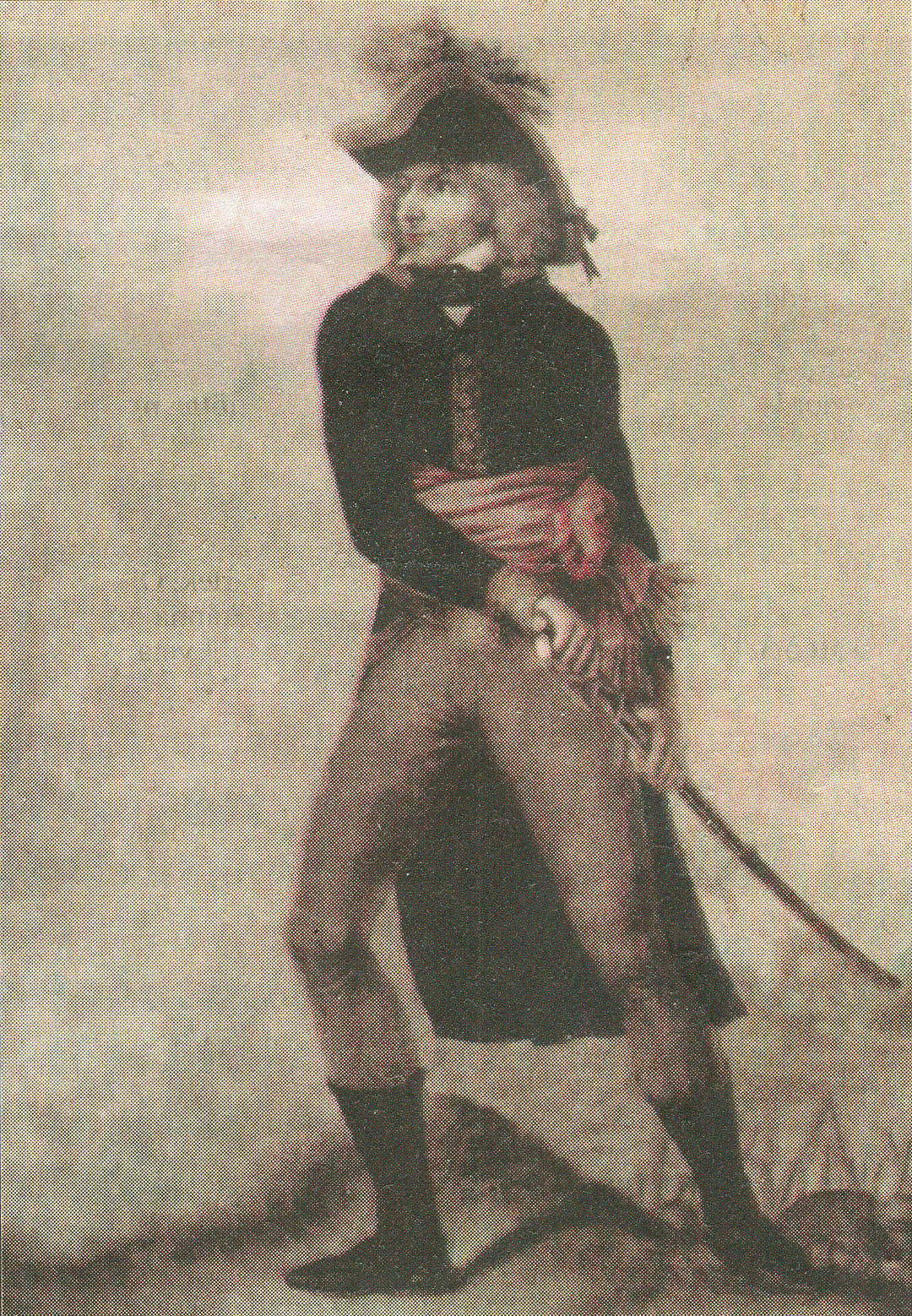
General Jean-Baptiste Bernadotte, who arrived in Italy with reinforcements from the Army of Sambre and Meuse

The first French generals to move were Masséna, Guieu, Jean-Baptiste Bernadotte and Sérurier, who advanced without difficulties occupying Primolano on 1 March. On 10 March the Italian army set off again to cut off all four possible retreat routes (Tagliamento valley, Isonzo and Tarvisio, Ljubljana and Klagenfurt or Mura river valley) of Archduke Charles, positioned between Spilimbergo and San Vito al Tagliamento. The main attack nucleus was made up of 32,000 Frenchmen who headed towards Valvasone covered on their left by Masséna's 11,000 men, and on 16 March the French led by General Bernadotte forded the Tagliamento, capturing 500 Austrians and 6 cannons. Archduke Charles ordered a retreat on Udine, but the French continued the advance engaging the Austrian Lusignan at Tarvisio which, although reinforced by three divisions, failed not to lose the city together with 32 cannons and 5,000 men, while Bernadotte pursued the rest of the Austrian army towards Ljubljana and General Dugua entered Trieste. The result of all these maneuvers and battles was that Archduke Charles had already lost 15,000 men by 25 March in his first campaign against Bonaparte. To make matters worse for the Austrians, in the meantime Joubert's column in Tyrol had managed to take Bolzano and Bressanone, paving the way for Klagenfurt, happily reached on 29 March by Masséna, Guieu and Chabot (in place of the once again ill Sérurier).

At this point Napoleon took the decision to leave the lines of communication unprotected by ordering Joubert, Bernadotte and Victor to concentrate in Klagenfurt (reinforcements were in fact needed to march on Vienna, also due to the strong detachments left to guard the flanks of the French deployment), awaiting General Moreau's attack on the Rhine, who however showed no sign of wanting to take action. To stall, the French occupied Leoben (in present-day Styria) on 7 April 1797 as a show of strength to induce Archduke Charles to accept the suspension of hostilities already advanced on 31 March. With Napoleon's vanguards having reached Semmering, Charles signed a five-day truce on 7 April. The agreement did not improve the French situation because Moreau had still not yet gone on the offensive, and furthermore, revolts were developing in Tyrol and Venice. Minding these events, Napoleon obtained another five-day truce on 13 April, but on the 16th, without waiting for the plenipotentiary of the Directory, General Clarke, he put forward a series of points in the Peace of Leoben, which the Austrians accepted and signed on 18 April 1797. In this way the Italian campaign ended.

=== Campo Formio ===
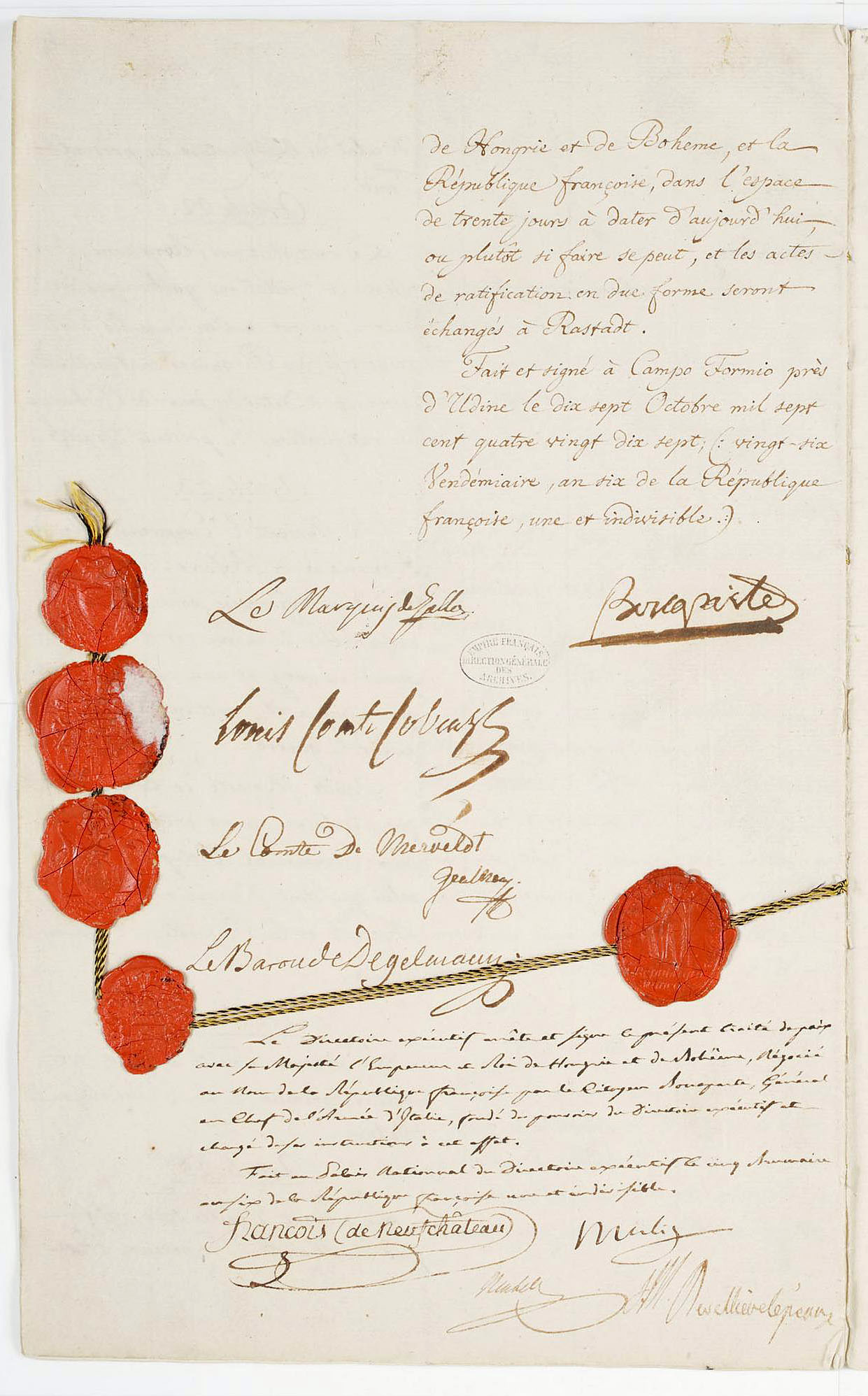
Last page of the Treaty of Campo Formio. To the left are the signatures of four Austrian representatives: Marzio Mastrilli, Ludwig von Cobenzl, Maximilian, Count of Merveldt, and Ignatius, baron of Degelmann. To the right is the signature of the French representative, Napoleon Bonaparte.

The Directory was shocked by the terms of Leoben. Of particular controversy, per Leoben, Austria would receive the Republic of Venice, despite it being a neutral party during the conflict, and in May 1797 Bonaparte fought a short war to conquer Venice, leading to the fall of the republic. However, the celebrations in France over the news of peace, Napoleon's pre-emptive argument for the terms in Paris, and his threat to go into politics should the Directory reject Leoben convinced the Directory to accept his negotiation. More alarming for Napoleon than the Directors were the recent elections in France, which saw the conservatives gain a supermajority in the French legislature. With the possibility of the restoration of the French monarchy and the Austrians dragging their feet on a lasting peace treaty, Napoleon sent troops under Augereau to Paris and prepared for renewed war in Italy.

On 4 September 1797, with a document supplied by Napoleon of the treasonous activities of Jean-Charles Pichegru, the then-President of the Council of Five Hundred, and the backing of troops by General Lazare Hoche and Augereau, the Directory felt strong enough to purge the legislature in the Coup of 18 Fructidor. Bonaparte, who had no intention of implicating himself directly, instead sent his aide de camp Antoine de Lavalette to observe the events in Paris, and upon learning that public reaction to the coup was negative, distanced himself from it. Nevertheless, the coup had ended the threat of a Bourbon restoration for the time being, and compelled the Austrians to conclude final peace terms. Ignoring the Directory's order not to give up Venice, and absent the Directory's plenipotentiary, Napoleon Bonaparte personally signed the Treaty of Campo Formio on 17 October 1797, bringing the War of the First Coalition to an end.

Per the terms of the treaty, the Holy Roman Empire was obliged to cede the Austrian Netherlands to France, accepted the French occupation of the left bank of the Rhine and the Ionian Islands and recognized the Cisalpine Republic; in exchange, France offered the Republic of Venice including Istria, Dalmatia and other territories in the Adriatic. With a peace agreed to, Napoleon Bonaparte arrived with his victorious army in Paris on December 5, to a hero's welcome. Across Europe, the campaign had turned Napoleon Bonaparte into a household name, with a wide spectrum of supporters and detractors; across France, the campaign had turned Napoleon into a powerful political player. Bonaparte's battles and maneuvers astonished contemporaries, with the celebrated Russian general Alexander Suvorov remarking of Bonaparte, "My God, how he moves!". In addition to the prestige, power, and wealth he had gained, the success of the campaign also resulted in Napoleon's appointment to the Army of England.

== Legacy ==
The campaign demonstrated Napoleon's abilities as a leader of the French Army. Bonaparte became famous in France, and became well known throughout all of Europe. Henri Jacques Guillaume Clarke, a French representative of the Directory, stated about Napoleon post-campaign:

"The General-in-Chief has rendered the most important services.… The fate of Italy has been several times depended on his learned combinations. There is nobody here who does not look upon him as a man of genius, and he is effectively that. He will be feared, loved, and respected in Italy.… A healthy judgement, enlightened ideas, put him abreast of distinguishing the true from the false. His ‘coup d’oeil’ is sure. His resolutions will be followed up with energy and vigor. His 'sang-froid' in the liveliest affairs is as remarkable as his extreme promptitude in changing his plans when unforeseen circumstances demand it. His manner of executions is learned and well-calculated. Bonaparte can bear himself with success in more than one career. His superior talents and his knowledge give him the means.… Do not think, Citizen Directors, that I am speaking of him from enthusiasm. It is with calm that I write, and no interest guides me except that of making you know the truth. Bonaparte will be put by posterity in the rank of the greatest men".

== See also ==
- List of wars involving France
- Italian campaigns of the French Revolutionary Wars
- Italian Campaign of 1813–1814

== Bibliography ==
- Schneid, Frederick C. (2023). Colson, Bruno; Mikaberidze, Alexander (eds.). Napoleon's Italian Campaigns, 1796–1800. The Cambridge History of the Napoleonic Wars. Vol. 2: Fighting the Napoleonic Wars. Cambridge: Cambridge University Press. doi:10.1017/9781108278096.018. ISBN 978-1-108-41766-2. Archived from the original on August 19, 2024.
- Dwyer, Philip (2008a). Napoleon: The Path to Power. Yale University Press. ISBN 978-0-3001-3754-5.
- Smith, Digby (1998). The Napoleonic Wars Data Book. The Greenhill. ISBN 1-85367-276-9.
- Boycott-Brown, Martin (2001). The Road to Rivoli. Cassell & Co. ISBN 0-304-35305-1.
- Clodfelter, M. (2008). Warfare and Armed Conflicts: A Statistical Encyclopedia of Casualty and Other Figures, 1492–2007 (3rd ed.). Jefferson, North Carolina: McFarland. ISBN 978-0-7864-3319-3.
- Chandler, David G. (2006) [1992]. Le campagne di Napoleone, vol. I (in French) (9ª edizione ed.). Milano: BUR. ISBN 9788817119047.
- Duffy, Christopher (1999). Eagles Over the Alps: Suvorov in Italy and Switzerland, 1799. Chicago, Illinois: The Emperor's Press. ISBN 978-1883476182.
- Mascilli Migliorini, Luigi (2001). Napoleone (in Italian). Roma: Salerno editrice.
- Roberts, Andrew (2014). Napoleon: A Life. Penguin Group. ISBN 978-0-6700-2532-9.
- Tulard, Jean (1991). Le Directory et le Consulat. History of Socialism in France (in French). France: Presses Universitaires de France. ISBN 978-2130439806. OCLC 802676216.
- Zamoyski, Adam (2018). Napoleon: The Man Behind The Myth. Great Britain: HarperCollins. ISBN 978-0-0081-1607-1.

=== Further reading ===
- "First Italian Campaign, 1796-97". PBS. p. 2.
- "Campaign in Italy". Encyclopædia Britannica.
- Chandler, David G. Le campagne di Napoleone, vol. II (in French) (9ª edizione ed.). Milano: BUR. ISBN 9788817119047.
- Mark, Harrison W. (19 April 2023). "Napoleon's Italian Campaign". WorldHistory.
- Adlow, Elijah (November 6, 2015). Napoleon In Italy, 1796–1797. Wagram Press. ISBN 9781786254986.
- Vigo-Roussillon, Francois (1981). Journal de campagne, 1793–1837 (in French). ISBN 978-2704812110.
