= Battle of Lodi =

10 May 1796 battle between French and Austrian forces

- Part of the Italian campaign of 1796–1797
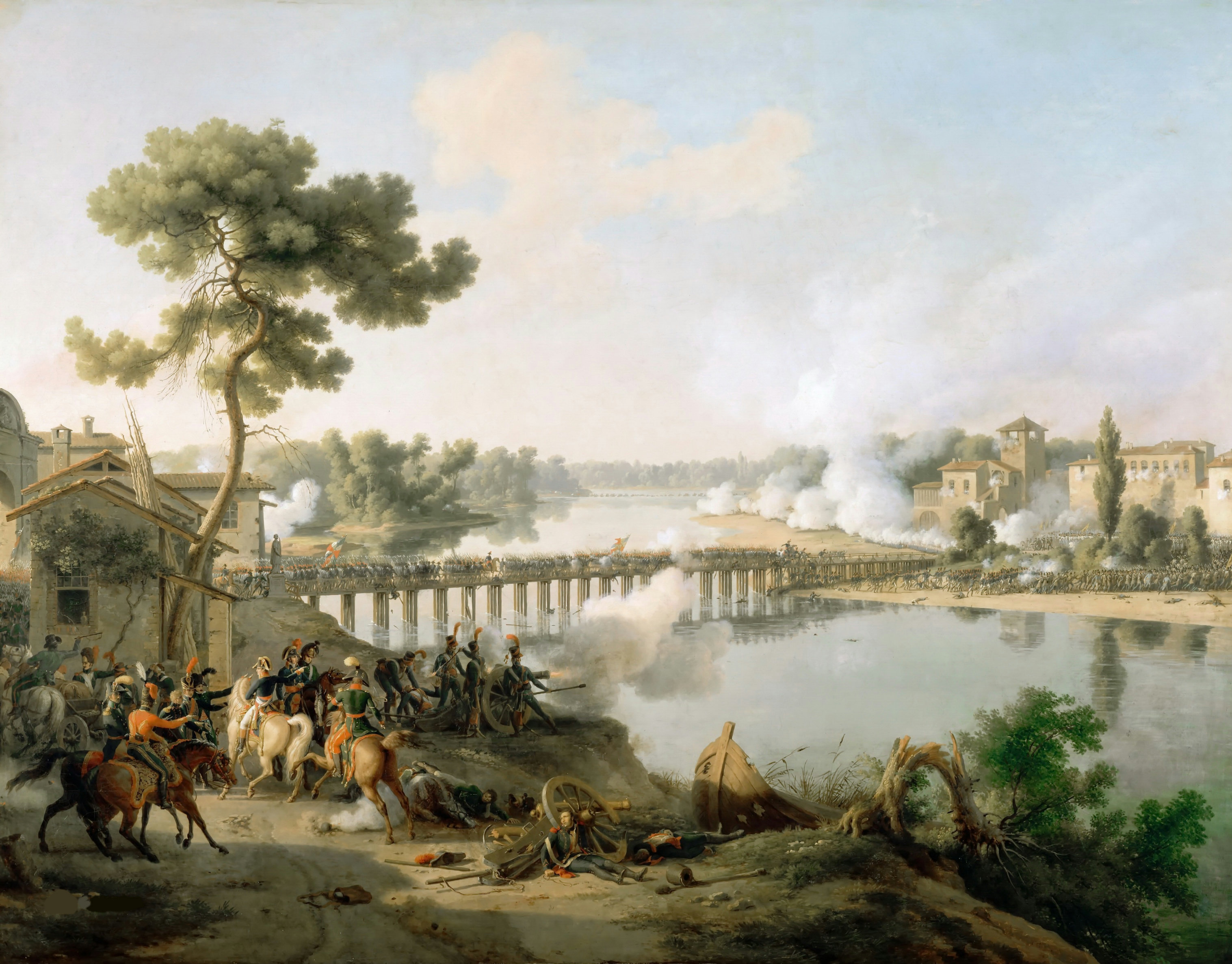
- The Battle of Lodi; Louis-François Lejeune, 1804
| Date | 10 May 1796 |
| Location | Lodi, present-day Italy 45°19′09″N 9°30′32″E |
| Result | French victory |

Belligerents
| French Republic | Habsburg monarchy |

Commanders and leaders
| Napoleon Bonaparte; Louis-Alexandre Berthier; Claude Dallemagne; André Masséna; Marc Antoine de Beaumont; Michel Ordener; Jean Lannes | Karl Sebottendorf; Josef Philipp Vukassovich; Gerhard Rosselmini |

Strength
| 15,500 infantry; 2,000 cavalry; 30 guns | 9,500; 14 guns |

Casualties and losses
| At least 350 | 335 killed or wounded; 1,700 captured; 16 guns |
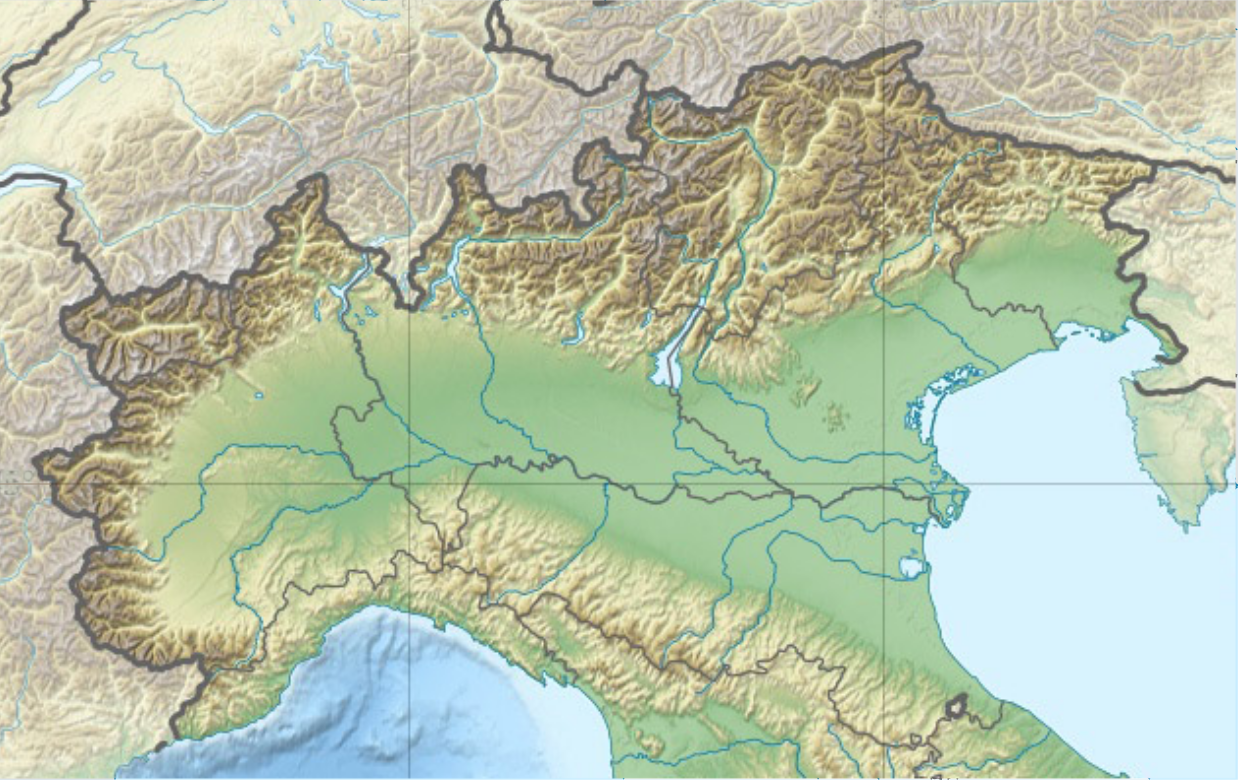
- Location within Northern Italy Battle of Lodi (Europe)

War of the First Coalition:
Italian Campaign
current battle
Napoleon as subordinate
Napoleon in command

The Battle of Lodi was fought on Tuesday 10 May 1796 between French forces under General Napoleon Bonaparte and an Austrian rear guard commanded by Karl Philipp Sebottendorf at Lodi, Lombardy (then part of the Habsburg monarchy, now in Italy), being one of the key engagements of the Italian Campaign. The conflict took place as French forces pursued the retreating Austrian army across the Adda River. After intense artillery bombardment, French infantry spearheaded by the carbineers and grenadiers launched a famed storming charge across the narrow wooden bridge of Lodi under heavy enemy fire. Although the main Austrian army successfully withdrew eastward, the storming of the bridge cleared the way for Napoleon to occupy Milan five days later, vastly enhancing his military reputation and earning him the lifelong affection of his troops, who affectionately nicknamed him "The Little Corporal" (Le Petit Caporal).

== Order of battle ==
=== French Army ===
French Army: General Napoleon Bonaparte (15,500 infantry, 2,000 cavalry)

- Division: General of Division André Masséna
- Advance Guard: General of Brigade Claude Dallemagne (3,000 elite infantry)
- Cavalry: General of Brigade Marc Antoine de Beaumont and Colonel Michel Ordener

=== Austrian Army ===
Austrian-Neapolitan Army: Beaulieu (not present)

- Division: Feldmarschall-Leutnant Karl Philipp Sebottendorf (6,577 not including Nicoletti and Naples detachments)
  - Rear Guard: General-Major Josef Philipp Vukassovich
    - 2 battalions Carlstädter Grenz Infantry Regiment
  - Lodi Covering Force: General-Major Gerhard Rosselmini
    - 1 battalion Nádasdy Infantry Regiment # 39 (623)
    - 2 squadrons Mészáros Uhlan Regiment # 1 (286)
  - First Line:
    - 2 battalions Carlstädter Grenz IR (from rear guard)
    - 1 battalion Warasdiner Grenz IR (1,262)
    - 1 battalion Nádasdy Infantry Regiment # 39 (from covering force)
    - 14 cannon
  - Second Line:
    - 3 battalions Terzi Infantry Regiment # 16 (1,212)
    - 1 battalion Belgiojoso Infantry Regiment # 44 (311)
    - 1 battalion Thurn Infantry Regiment # 43 (622)
    - 4 squadrons Archduke Joseph Hussars # 2
    - 2 squadrons Mészáros Uhlan Regiment # 1 (from covering force)
  - Detached to Corte Palasio: GM Franz Nicoletti (1,958)
    - 2 battalions Strassoldo Infantry Regiment # 27
    - 1 battalion Tuscany IR # 23
    - 2 squadrons Erdödy Hussars # 9
  - Detached to Fontana: (1,092)
    - 8 squadrons Kingdom of Naples Cavalry Regiments Re and Regina

== Battle ==
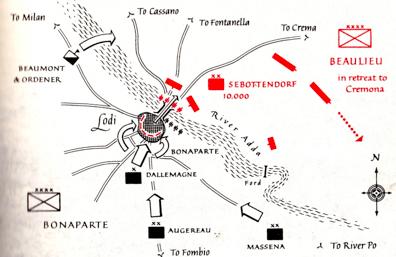
Map of the battle

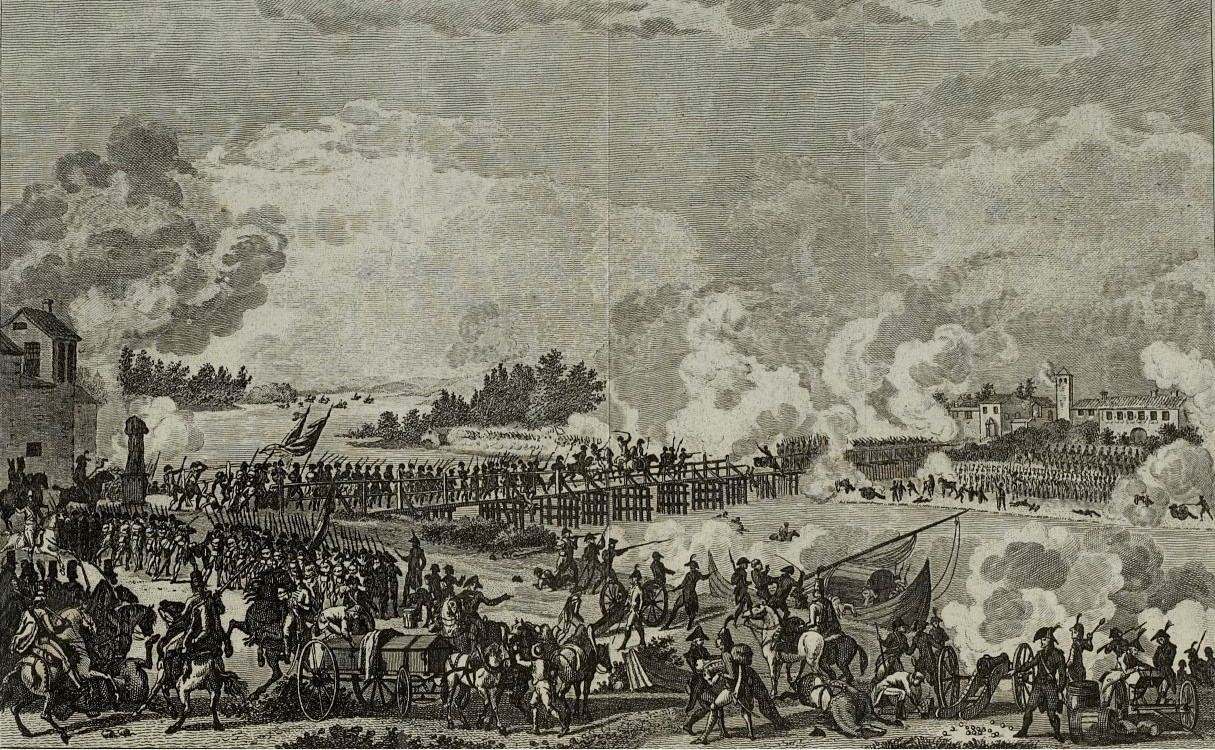
The French passing the bridge, (Musée de la Révolution française).

The French advance guard caught up with Josef Vukassovich's Austrian rear-guard at about 9 am on 10 May and after a clash followed them towards Lodi. Vukassovich was soon relieved by Gerhard Rosselmini's covering force near the town. The town's defences were not strong, the defenders were few, and the French were able to get inside and make their way towards the bridge. The span was defended from the far bank by nine battalions of infantry arrayed in two lines and fourteen guns. The Austrian general in command at Lodi, Sebottendorf, also had four squadrons of Neapolitan cavalry at his disposal, giving him a total of 6,577 men, who were mostly completely exhausted after a hasty forced march. Sebottendorf decided that it was inadvisable to retire in daylight, and opted to defend the crossing until nightfall.

According to French grenadier François Vigo-Roussillon, the Austrians had men attempting to destroy the bridge but the French stopped their efforts by bringing up guns to fire along its length. It should have been fairly easy to prevent a French crossing because the bridge was wooden and could have been burnt. The bridge was about 200 yards long and was simply constructed with wooden piles driven into the river bed every few yards with beams laid to form a roadway.

The French advance guard was not strong enough to try to cross the bridge so several hours passed as additional French forces arrived. That afternoon, French artillery arrived and the heavy guns were positioned to fire across the river. With the heavy guns in place, a violent cannonade began to pound the Austrian positions across the river. It has been suggested that Bonaparte was personally involved in directing some of the guns and that his troops began to refer to him as le petit caporal (the little corporal) because of this. However, there is no contemporary evidence to back this up.

After bombarding the Austrian positions for several hours, at about 6 pm the French prepared to attack. Marc Antoine de Beaumont's cavalry was sent to ford the river upstream while the 2nd battalion of carabiniers (elite light infantry) was readied inside the walls of the town for an assault onto the bridge itself. The carabiniers stormed out of the gates and onto the bridge. Vigo-Roussillon tells us that the enemy artillery fired one salvo when the troops were part-way across, causing numerous casualties, at which point the column wavered and stopped. It was then that a number of senior French officers, including André Masséna, Louis Berthier, Jean Lannes, Jean-Baptiste Cervoni, and Claude Dallemagne, rushed to the head of the column and led it forward again. (Some authorities suggest that the French retreated and attacked again, but an important Austrian source supports the thesis of a single attack.)

As the French column pushed forward over the bridge, some French carabiniers climbed down the bridge pilings and waded through the river firing as they went. The Austrian troops, already exhausted from hours of marching and fighting without food and presumably demoralised by the French cannonade, were likely concerned that the French cavalry was in position to cut them off from the main Austrian army. The Austrian morale collapsed as the carabiniers rushed towards them and a hasty retreat ensued. The remaining Austrian soldiers made the most of the gathering darkness to make their escape towards Crema though some units maintained a dogged rearguard action thus discouraging the French from pursuing too closely. Oberst Count Attems of Terzi Infantry Regiment # 16 was killed covering the successful, though costly withdrawal.

== Aftermath ==
The Battle of Lodi was not a decisive engagement since the bulk of the Austrian army managed to escape. Nevertheless, the engagement became a central element in the Napoleonic legend convincing even Napoleon himself that he was superior to other generals and that he was destined to achieve great things.

== Sources ==
- Agnelli, G. "La battaglia al ponte di Lodi e l’inizio della settimana napoleonica lodigiana". Archivio storico lombardo, no. 60 (1933): 1–73.
- Boycott-Brown, M. The Road to Rivoli: Napoleon's First Campaign. London: Cassell, 2001.
- Chandler, David. Dictionary of the Napoleonic Wars. New York: Macmillan, 1979. ISBN 0-02-523670-9.
- Chandler, David. The Campaigns of Napoleon. Scribner, 2009. ISBN 9781439131039.
- Schels, J. B. "Die Kriegsereignisse in Italien vom 15 April bis 16 Mai 1796, mit dem Gefechte bei Lodi". Oesterreichische Militärische Zeitschrift Bd. 2; Bd. 4 (1825): 57–97, 195–231, 267–268.
- Smith, Digby. The Napoleonic Wars Data Book. London: Greenhill, 1998. ISBN 1-85367-276-9.
- Vigo-Roussillon, F. Journal de campagne (1793–1837). Paris, 1981.
