= André Masséna =

French Marshal (1758–1817)

Marshal of the Empire André Masséna Prince of Essling, Duke of Rivoli
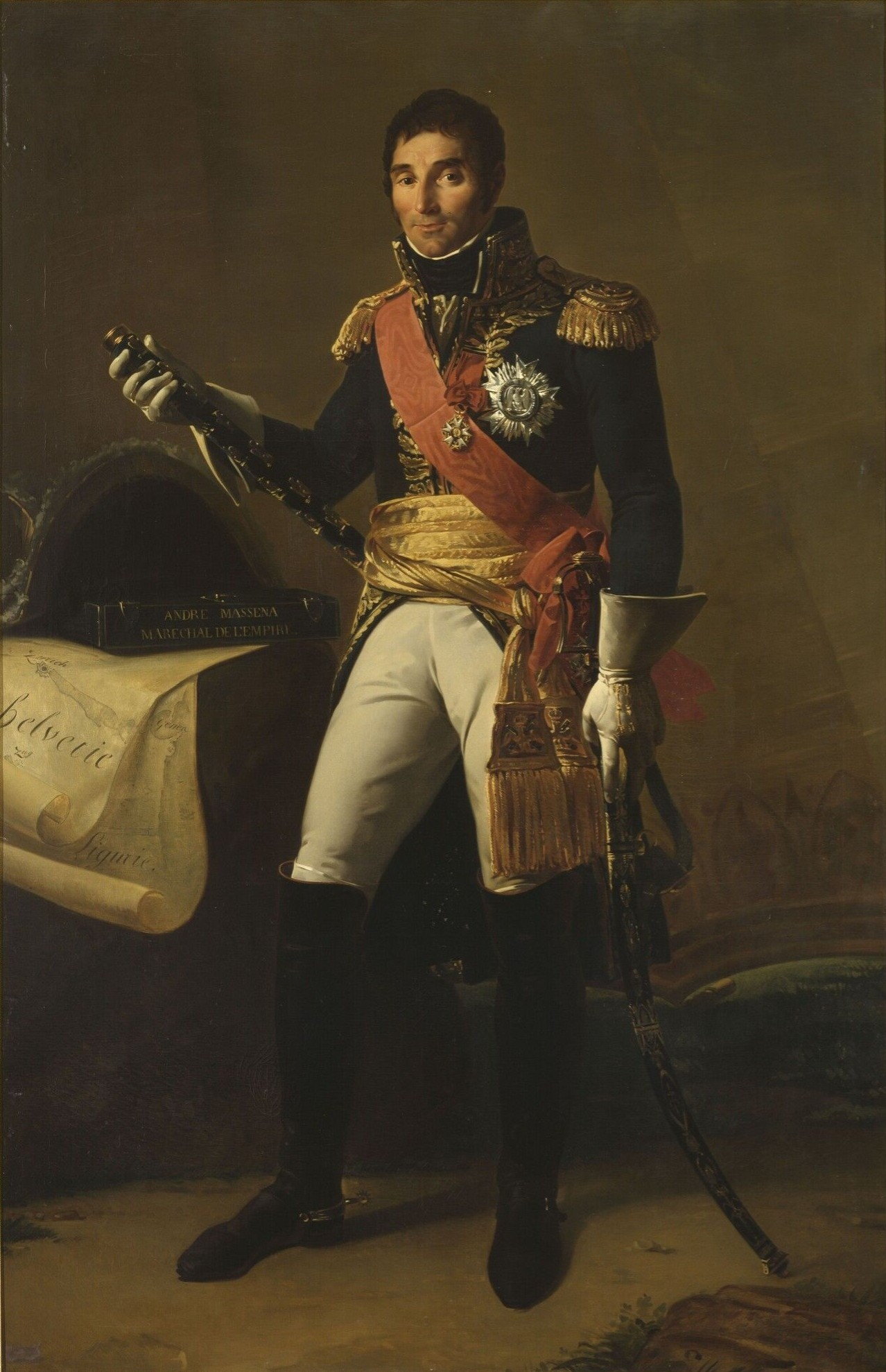
- Portrait of Masséna made c. 1853 after an 1804 original by Antoine-Jean Gros
- Born: Andrea Massena; 6 May 1758; Nice, Kingdom of Sardinia
- Died: 4 April 1817 (aged 58); Paris, France
- Burial place: Père Lachaise Cemetery
- Military career
- Allegiance: France
- Branch: Army
- Service years: 1775–1817
- Rank: General of division
- Nickname: L'enfant chéri de la victoire
- Commands: Army of Helvetia; Army of the Danube; Army of Italy; VIII Corps; Army of Naples; V Corps; IV Corps; Army of Portugal
- Conflicts: See battles: French Revolutionary Wars; War of the First Coalition; Siege of Toulon; Second Battle of Saorgio; First Battle of Dego; Battle of Monte Settepani; Battle of Loano; Italian campaign; Montenotte campaign; Battle of Montenotte; Second Battle of Dego; Battle of Mondovì; Battle of Lodi; Battle of Borghetto; Siege of Mantua; Battle of Lonato; Battle of Castiglione; Battle of Peschiera; Battle of Rovereto; Battle of Bassano (Wurmser); Battle of Bassano (Alvinczi); Battle of Caldiero; Battle of Arcole; Battle of Rivoli; Battle of La Favorita; Battle of Tarvis; War of the Second Coalition; Battle of Chur; First Battle of Feldkirch; Second Battle of Feldkirch; Battle of Frauenfeld; First Battle of Zurich; Battle of Schwyz; Second Battle of Zurich; Suvorov's Swiss campaign; Battle of Klöntal; Battle of Muottental; Combats of Schwanden; Siege of Genoa; Napoleonic Wars; War of the Third Coalition; Battle of Verona; Battle of Caldiero; Battle of Forano; Invasion of Naples; Siege of Gaeta; War of the Fourth Coalition; War of the Fifth Coalition; Battle of Landshut; Battle of Eckmühl; Battle of Ebelsberg; Battle of Aspern-Essling; Battle of Wagram; Battle of Hollabrunn; Battle of Znaim; Peninsular War; Siege of Astorga; Siege of Ciudad Rodrigo; Siege of Almeida; Battle of Bussaco; Battle of Sabugal; Battle of Fuentes de Oñoro

André Masséna, prince d'Essling, duc de Rivoli (English: /ˌmæsɛˈnɑː/ mass-eh-NAH, French: [ɑ̃dʁe massena]; born Andrea Massena; 6 May 1758 – 4 April 1817), was a French military commander of the French Revolutionary Wars and the Napoleonic Wars. He was one of the original eighteen Marshals of the Empire created by Napoleon I, who nicknamed him "the dear child of victory" (l'enfant chéri de la victoire). He is considered to be one of the greatest generals of the Revolutionary and Napoleonic Wars.

Beginning his career as an enlisted soldier under the ancien régime, Masséna established himself as one of the best generals of the French Republic during the French Revolutionary Wars. He served as Napoleon Bonaparte's main lieutenant in the Italian campaign of the War of the First Coalition, playing a decisive role in the victories of Arcole and Rivoli, and was at the helm of the advance into Austrian territory that compelled them to open peace negotiations. In 1799, Masséna defeated the Second Coalition forces at the Second Battle of Zurich, which had considerable strategic repercussions for France.

Under the French Empire, Masséna continued to demonstrate great competence in his various commands, both under Napoleon's direct orders and at the head of independent forces in secondary fronts. He campaigned in Italy once again in 1805, invaded the Kingdom of Naples in 1806 and played a major role at the battles of Aspern-Essling and Wagram in 1809. Masséna was rewarded by Napoleon with the titles of Duke of Rivoli (duc de Rivoli) and Prince of Essling (prince d'Essling). However, his failed invasion of Portugal in 1810 earned him the disgrace of the Emperor, who no longer appointed him to any major commands during the Empire. Having rallied to the Bourbon Restoration, Masséna died in Paris shortly afterwards at the age of 58.

Although many of Napoleon's generals were trained at the finest French and European military academies, Masséna was among those who achieved greatness without the benefit of formal education. While those of noble rank acquired their education and promotions as a matter of privilege, Masséna rose from humble origins to such prominence that Napoleon referred to him as "the greatest name of my military empire". In addition to his battlefield successes, Masséna's leadership aided the careers of many. A majority of the French marshals of the time served under his command at some point.

== Early life and career ==
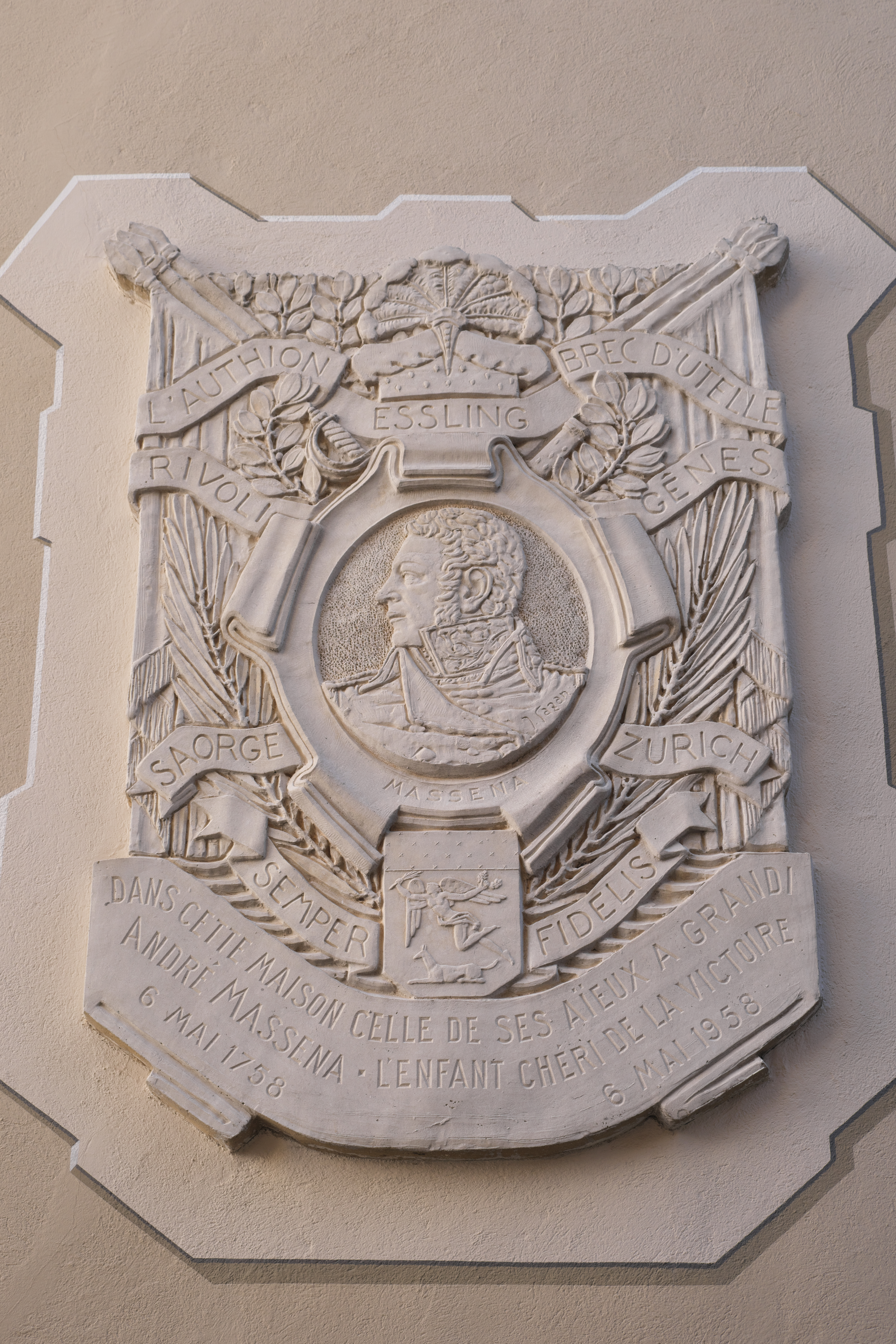
Commemorative bas-relief at Masséna's childhood home in Levens, Alpes-Maritimes, installed on the bicentenary of his birth in 1958.

André Masséna was born on 6 May 1758 in Nice, in the County of Nice, then part of the Kingdom of Sardinia, the son of Jules César Masséna (1731–1764) and Catherine Fabre. He was baptized Andrea Massena the same day at the Cathedral of Saint Reparata by Canon Ignazio Cacciardi. His father's family, originally from Piedmont, had lived for at least three centuries in the Vésubie valley and owned land in Levens, a town in the hinterland of Nice. His father, after serving in the army for seven years, became a wine merchant on his return home in 1754. That same year he married Catherine Fabre, daughter of a contractor and shipowner from Toulon, with whom he had six children. He died from tuberculosis in 1764 and his widow, who quickly remarried, entrusted their children to the care of her first husband's relatives; André, the eldest of three sons, was then six years old.

Masséna spent his childhood in the family home in Levens and revealed himself early on a turbulent boy. When he was not yet ten years old, his grandmother, anxious to compensate for his lack of education, tried to make him a baker, but Masséna did not appreciate this career any more than he did working in his uncle's soap factory, where he remained until the age of 14. Giving up on becoming a craftsman, he preferred to run away and became a cabin boy aboard a merchant ship. He sailed in the Mediterranean Sea and on an extended voyage to French Guiana. In 1775, at the age of 17, Masséna definitively gave up sailing and, on the advice of his uncle Marcel, who was already serving in the unit as a non-commissioned officer, enlisted in the Royal Italian Regiment stationed in Toulon.

Benefiting from his good physical condition, Masséna learned the profession of arms while his uncle took care of his education. Appointed corporal on 1 September 1776, he was successively promoted to sergeant on 18 April 1777, to quartermaster on 14 February 1783, and finally to adjutant at the age of 26 on 4 September 1784. This was the highest rank a non-nobleman could achieve in the French Royal Army. On 13 April of the same year, Masséna was received as an apprentice in the Toulon masonic lodge Les Élèves de Minerve. His progression within the hierarchy of the lodge was rapid and he became its master of ceremonies on 15 August. On 27 September 1787, the Grand Orient de France created the lodge La Parfaite Amitié within the Royal Italian Regiment itself, of which Masséna became the president.

In 1788, following the restructuring of the Royal Italian, Masséna was sent to Antibes where he joined the corps of Royal Chasseurs of Provence. He stood out as a competent non-commissioned officer; with further advancement blocked, Masséna requested the following year to be transferred to the gendarmerie, but his request was rejected despite the recommendations of his commanding officer. He finally left his regiment on 3 August 1789, in the early days of the French Revolution, to settle in Antibes. There he married Marie Rosalie Lamare, daughter of a master surgeon, on 10 August. With little wealth, Masséna opened up a grocery store and, without much success, engaged in smuggling for about two years. During this time he became an active member of local revolutionary circles. With the establishment of the National Guard in French cities, Masséna was appointed instructor of the Antibes unit due to his military experience. He showed great efficiency in this post and was soon elected instructor captain of the 2nd volunteer battalion of Var on 14 September 1791. He became second lieutenant-colonel on 1 February 1792 and first lieutenant-colonel on 1 August.

== French Revolutionary Wars ==
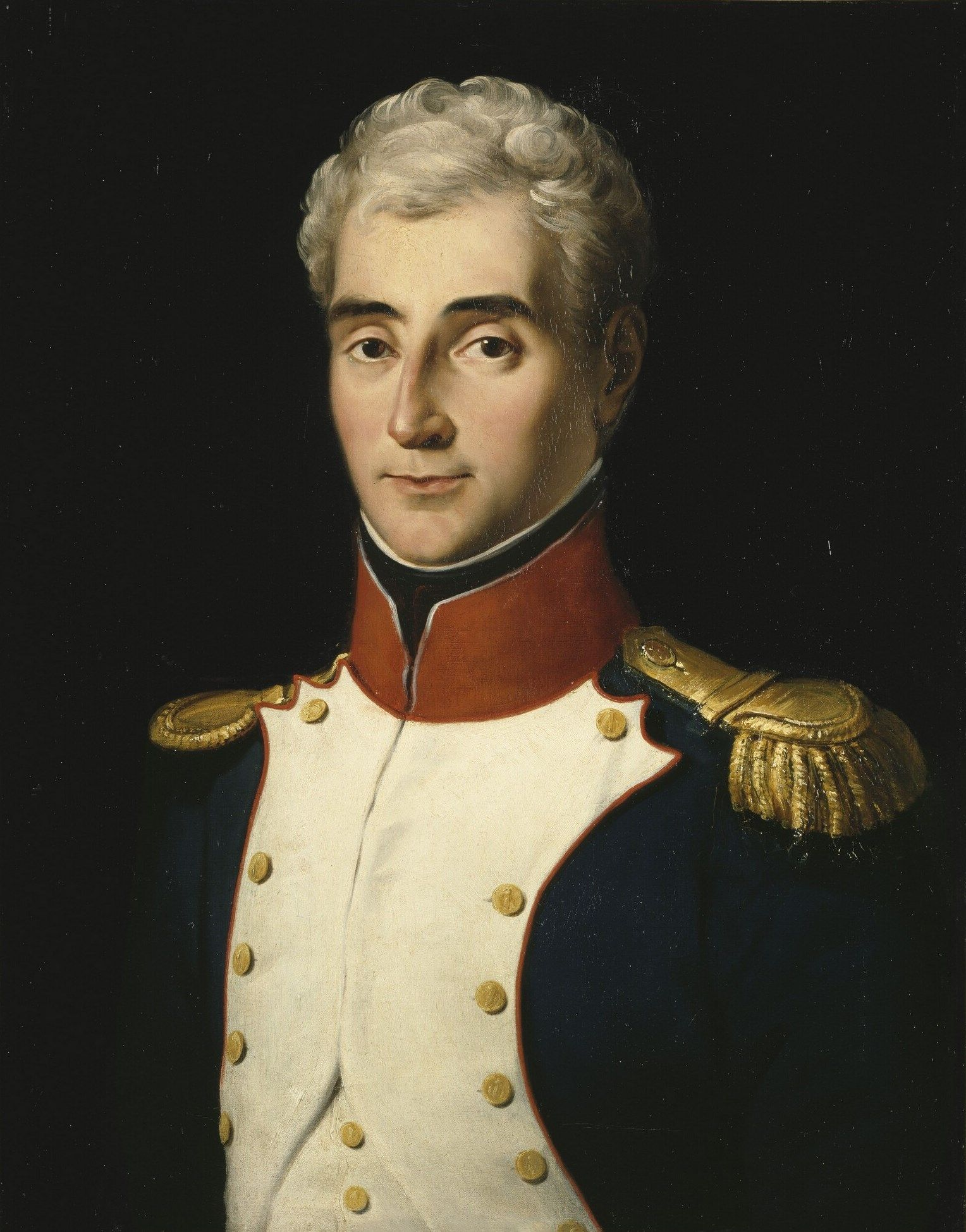
André Masséna as lieutenant-colonel of the 2nd Var Battalion in 1792. Portrait by Ferdinand Wachsmuth, 1834.

Masséna took part in the first Piedmontese campaign in the armies of the Republic. His battalion was assigned to the Army of the Var commanded by General Jacques Bernard d'Anselme, in a brigade that also included the 3rd Var Battalion, the 1st Hérault Battalion and a squadron of dragoons. Masséna quickly built a reputation as a leader who cared about discipline and the upkeep of his unit. General d'Anselme entered the city of Nice on 29 September 1792 at the head of the French troops occupying the County of Nice; shortly afterwards, Masséna's battalion, integrated into General Brunet's column, occupied the Principality of Monaco in October. The exactions committed by the French army angered the local population, and Masséna had to participate in the suppression of the barbet movement that resisted the French occupation of the County of Nice. As a native of the region and knowing it perfectly, he was particularly appreciated by his superiors, who also cited the good conduct of his battalion as an example.

On 8 June 1793, Masséna took part in an assault on the Col de Tende. Despite an initial success, he and his men came up against the defensive camp of Pérus, held by the Austro-Sardinians, and had to retreat in disorder. This setback did not hamper Masséna's career, who had the support of the new commander-in-chief of the army, General Dumerbion, a friend of the family. He received command of the Fougasse camp, on the Col de Turini, and proceeded to execute an arrest warrant against General Dortoman, whose management of the troops was called into question. On 17 August, he was named chef de brigade of the 51st Infantry Regiment, but Dumerbion refused to let him take up his assignment and Masséna therefore remained at the Fougasse camp; five days later, on 22 August, he learned of his promotion to general of brigade. He resisted Sardinian assaults on 7 and 12 September and then, after his transfer to the left wing of the Army of Italy, captured Utelle on 14 November. He soon afterwards requested leave to rest with his relatives at Antibes.

This interlude did not last long: on 14 December, Masséna was detached to the corps carrying out the Siege of Toulon under Dugommier's order. From his arrival, replacing General La Poype at short notice, he personally led a column in an assault on Fort Lartigue, which he captured in the first charge. Masséna then turned the fort's large-calibre cannons against the British fleet in the Toulon harbour, which, combined with the fall of Fort l'Éguillette – in which an officer named Napoleon Bonaparte distinguished himself – precipitated the withdrawal of the British squadron. As a reward for his services, Masséna was promoted to general of division on a provisional basis on 20 December 1793 and appointed governor of Toulon two days later.

Masséna then returned to the Army of Italy in January 1794 and obtained command of its right wing. In late March, in accordance with Dumerbion's orders, he launched an offensive in the Genoa sector which took him as far as Garessio on 19 April and then to Colle Ardente, which he captured at the same time as the mille Fourches camp. In conjunction with General Macquard, commanding the central division, he seized the fort of Saorgio on 29 April and then the Col de Tende on 8 May, opening the way into Piedmont for the Army of Italy. According to Jean-Jacques Prévost, "the execution of the campaign plan (initiated by Bonaparte) ensured by Masséna's brilliant tactical mastery and the effective reorganization of the field artillery due to Bonaparte were the essential factors of this success". Masséna was confirmed in his rank of general of division on 29 August 1794. At the same time, judging his force to be stretched too thin, he decided to fall back with his men to Ormea for fear of an offensive return by the Austrians. On 21 September, he defeated with 18,000 soldiers the 8,000 Austrians of General Wallis at the Battle of Dego. Due to an illness, Masséna left his post on 22 December and his division was entrusted to General Sérurier.

Returning to the army in April 1795, Masséna was placed at the head of the 1st division of the right wing of the Army of Italy. The Italian front then saw little activity but, at the end of June, the Austro-Sardinians went on the offensive and forced the French to retreat to Borghetto, reconquering the ground lost the previous year. Driven out of Melogno on 25 June, Masséna retreated but still managed to maintain discipline among his troops. Following this setback, commander-in-chief Kellermann was replaced by Schérer, who decided, after consulting Masséna, to launch an offensive as winter approached. The main maneuver in the center was entrusted to Masséna, who commanded the Laharpe and Charlet divisions for the occasion, to which was added a reserve contingent. At the Battle of Loano on 23 November, he pushed back the enemy positions as far as Mount Settepani, not without suffering heavy losses, before falling back south towards Finale, on the Mediterranean coast. His forces thus bypassed Loano and the Austrian army of General Wallis positioned on the road to Finale, which finally retreated to Savona, abandoning a large part of its artillery and baggage to the French. Masséna's decisive contribution to the victory earned him the congratulations of General Schérer, and representative on mission François Joseph Ritter wrote to the authorities: "Masséna has done wonders".

=== Under Bonaparte's orders in Italy ===
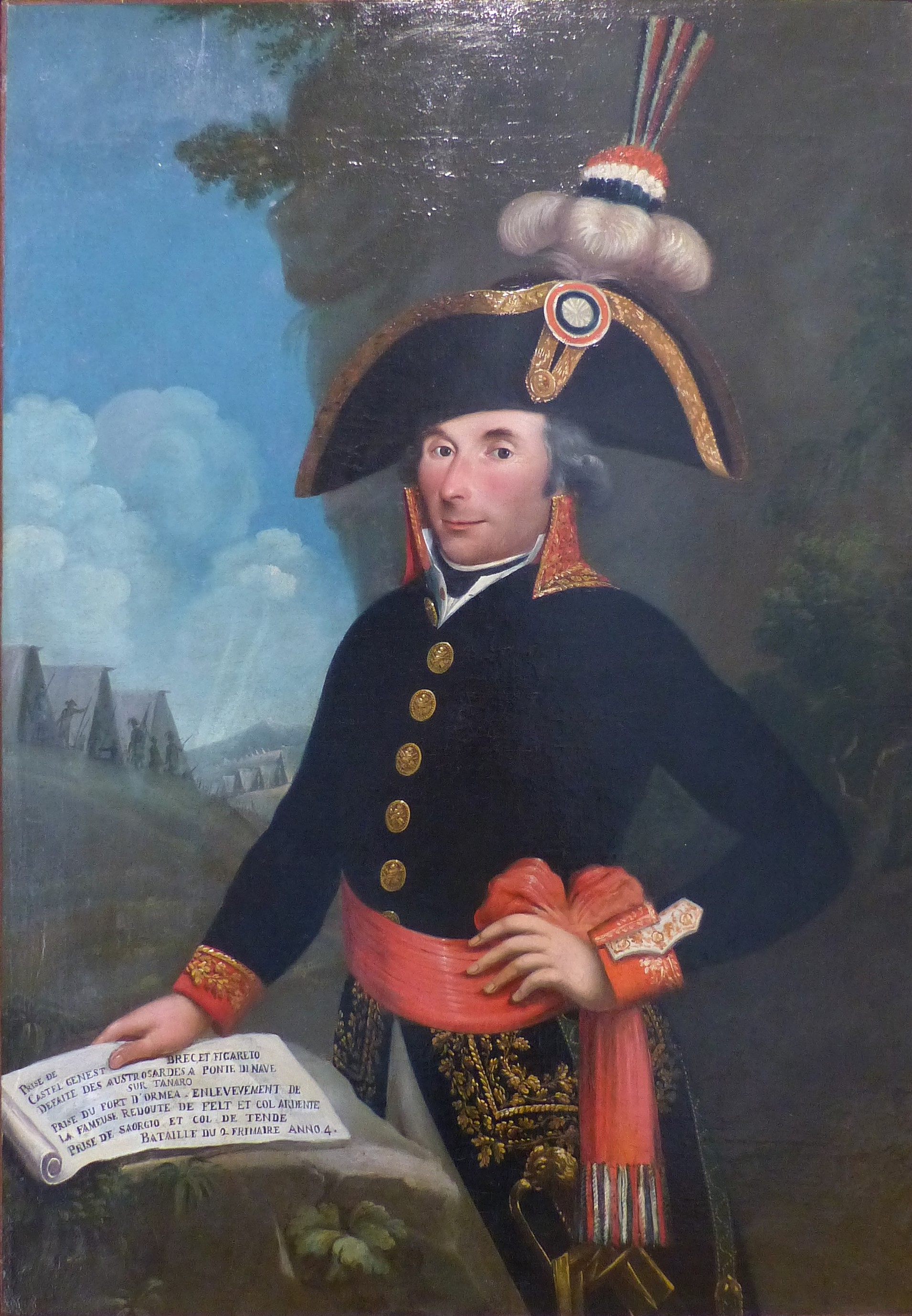
Masséna as a general of the French Revolutionary Army, 1796

Comrades, in front of you are 4,000 young men belonging to the richest families of Vienna; they have come with post-horses as far as Bassano: I recommend them to you.

— General Masséna's proclamation to his troops before the Battle of Rivoli.

Masséna, then aged 37 and with an already well-established reputation, seemed poised to succeed Schérer in the command of the Army of Italy. It was thus with skepticism that he received the appointment to this post of General Napoleon Bonaparte, ten years his junior, better known for his influential connections in Parisian circles than for his experience on the battlefield. Initially hostile to the newcomer, Masséna and the other divisional commanders were, however, very quickly won over by Bonaparte's determination, energy and sense of command. At the start of the campaign, in April 1796, Masséna had under his command the Laharpe (8,500 men) and Meynier (9,500 men) divisions.

After a meeting with Bonaparte on 10 April, during which the commander-in-chief informed him of his intentions, Masséna fought at the Battle of Montenotte where he launched a successful offensive on the Colle di Cadibona, cutting the Austro-Sardinian formation in two. He then pursued the Austrians retreating to Acqui. On 14 April, his troops captured the village of Dego after fierce combat and engaged in all sorts of excesses, in defiance of discipline. Indeed, when Vukassovich's Austrian corps attacked the next day, it came as a total surprise: the French soldiers had to evacuate the village and Masséna himself, finding himself in bed with a mistress, had to flee in his nightshirt. The general nevertheless managed to regroup his forces and to retake Dego at the end of the day, though not without suffering significant losses. The French troops soon won a series of victories that led the Kingdom of Sardinia to request an armistice, while the Austrians retreated hastily across Northern Italy.

Having crossed the Po at Piacenza, Bonaparte caught up with the Austrian rearguard at Lodi, on the banks of the river Adda. At the Battle of Lodi, the bridge separating the two banks was taken at a rapid pace by an infantry column led by Masséna and a handful of generals (Dallemagne, Lannes, Berthier and Cervoni). The Austrians, shaken by this vigorous action and the deployment of the French cavalry, abandoned the field. Masséna was awarded a sabre of honour for his conduct during this battle. Bonaparte entered Milan on 16 May. Despite the enthusiastic reception of the population, he demanded the payment of a contribution of 20 million gold pounds and allowed his troops to engage in looting, which led a week later to anti-French revolts in Binasco and Pavia. On 21 May, the commander-in-chief decided to resume his advance and the vanguard commanded by Masséna reached Brescia on 27 May and then Verona on 1 June. In this phase of the campaign, marked by numerous attempts by the Austrians to lift the Siege of Mantua, Masséna was constantly on the front line, which earned him the esteem of Bonaparte, who said of him on 14 August: "active, tireless, has audacity, coup d'œil and promptitude in making decisions".

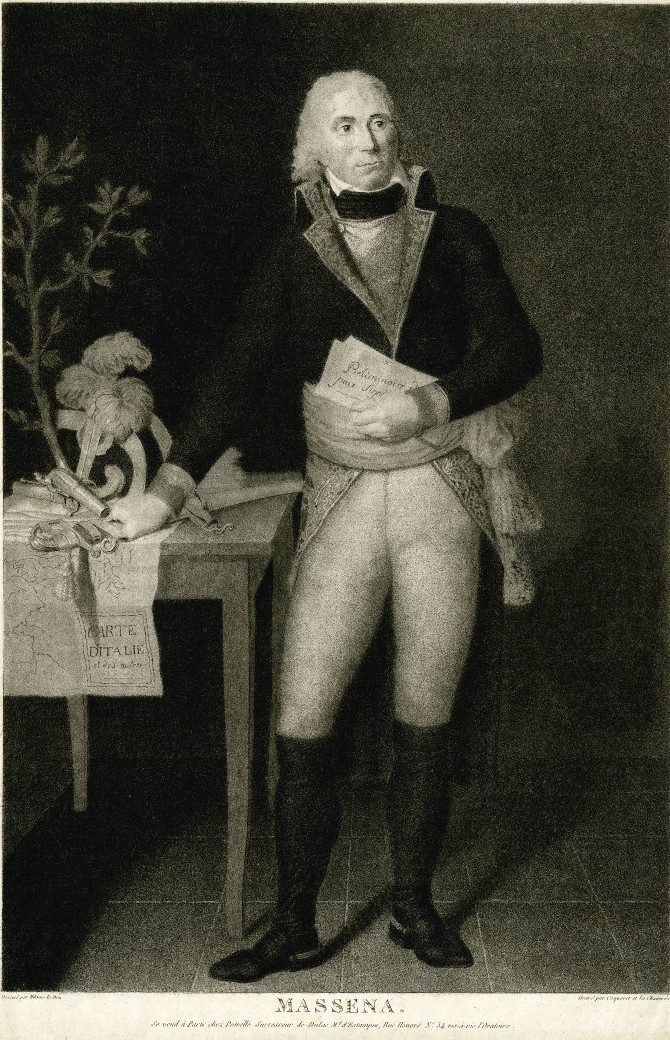
Portrait by Hilaire Ledru, 1797-1800

At the moment when Bonaparte prepared to confront Wurmser's imperial army, Masséna's division had 12,000 soldiers. Faced with an Austrian thrust from the north, Masséna retreated to Castelnuovo and then headed towards Lonato, where his division took part, on 3 August, in the battle that resulted in the defeat of Quosdanovich's Austrian corps. Two days later he commanded the left wing of the French army at the Battle of Castiglione, fought by Bonaparte against Wurmser. Early in the day, his troops feigned a retreat, leading Wurmser to rush into this "gap" in order to link up with Quasdanovich, who was now far away. However, a premature attack by Sérurier's division on his rear caused him to interrupt his movement; Bonaparte then unleashed a general attack and launched Masséna and Augereau against the Austrian center, while the positions of the Imperials on both of their wings were taken, leading to Wurmser's retreat.

A month later, Wurmser returned to the offensive in order to relieve the fortress of Mantua, still besieged by the French. Bonaparte immediately sent his forces to intercept him: the Masséna division defeated the Austrian general Davidovich at the Battle of Rovereto on 4 September, occupied Trento on the 5th and set off after Wurmser, who tried by all possible means to reach Mantua. At the Battle of Bassano on 8 September, the Imperial rearguard was cut to pieces by the Masséna and Augereau divisions, which did not prevent Wurmser from reaching Mantua on 15 September. At this point, Masséna's division numbered no more than 5,300 men, compared to around 10,000 at the beginning of the month. Shortly afterwards, a powerful Austrian army commanded by General Alvinczi arrived in the Italian theatre: Masséna, greatly outnumbered, retreated successively to Vicenza and then Verona, before attempting a counter-offensive against Alvinczi that was defeated at Caldiero on 12 November. Modifying his strategy, Bonaparte decided to strike the Austrian rear at the Battle of Arcole. On 15 November, Masséna captured the town of Porcile, covering Augereau's manoeuvre which was directed towards Arcole. However, despite the determination of their soldiers, the French were unable to hold on to the Alpone and retreated to the Adige. On 17 November, however, the clashes resumed and this time turned to the advantage of the Army of Italy: Masséna recaptured Ronco and Arcole which, combined with the pressure from Augereau's troops, forced Alvinczi to retreat.

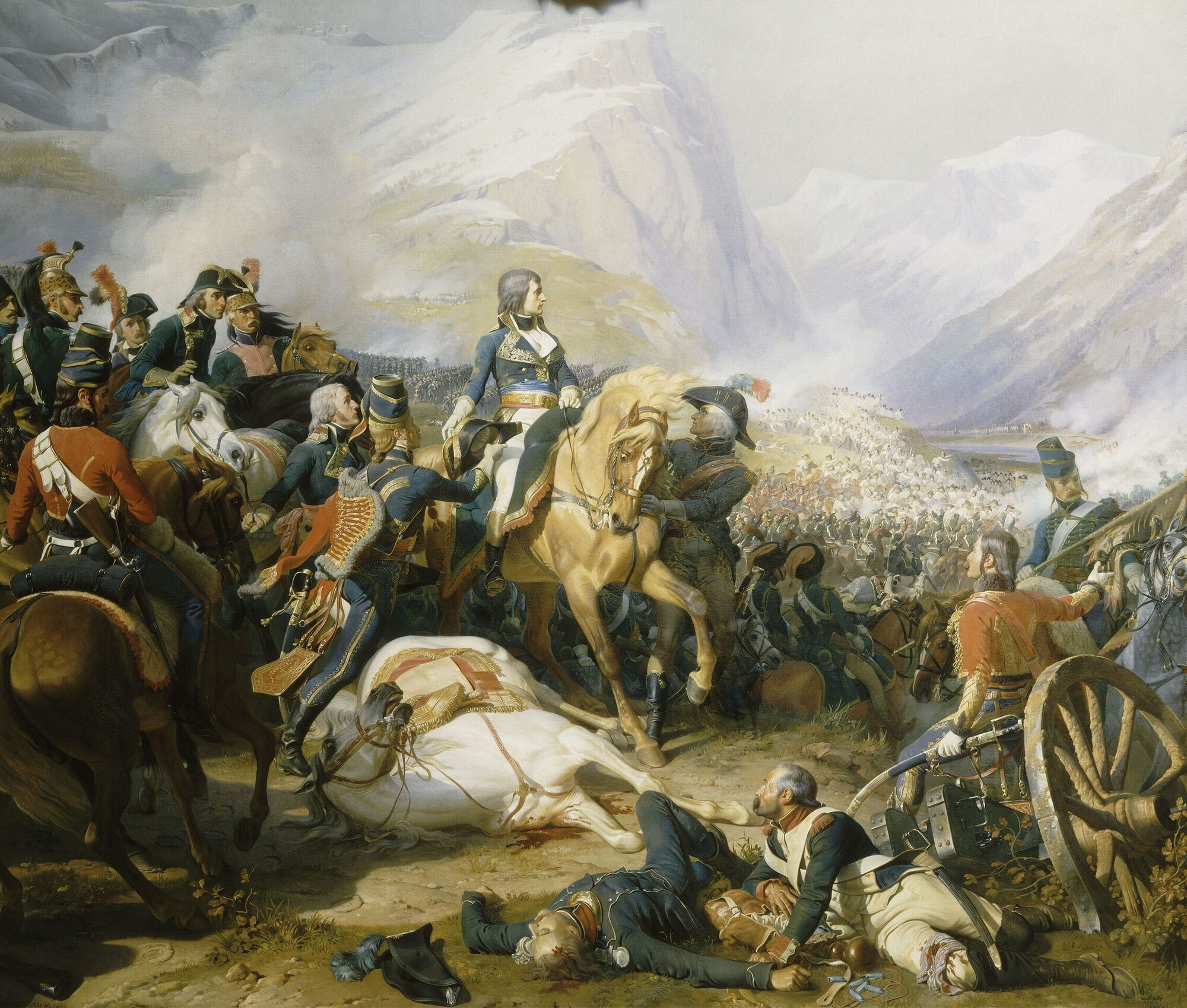
General Bonaparte at the Battle of Rivoli, 14 January 1797, in which Masséna's division played a decisive role. The Battle of Rivoli by Henri Félix Emmanuel Philippoteaux, 1844.

Masséna's division was then put into winter quarters in Verona, but indiscipline soon set in among the soldiers who threatened to rebel against their commanders. Alvinczi's resumption of the campaign in January 1797 nevertheless brought operations back to the forefront. On 13 January, Masséna, whose troops amounted to around 10,000 men, received the order to reinforce General Joubert, who was facing the bulk of the Austrian army at Rivoli, but only arrived there the following day after marching all night. With a bayonet charge, his division destroyed General Lusignan's Austrian column and helped to secure the French victory at the Battle of Rivoli. As soon as the battle was over, Masséna and his troops headed south to intercept a second Austrian army advancing to relieve Mantua. On 15 January, at the Villa La Favorita in front of Mantua, he encircled and defeated Provera's column. For his successes and talents as a tactician, Masséna was described in front of the troops by Bonaparte as "the dear child of victory" (l'enfant chéri de la victoire). The president of the Directory in Paris, Jean-François Rewbell, was also congratulatory: "The Executive Directory congratulates you, citizen general, for the new success that you have obtained against the enemies of the Republic. The brave division that you command has covered itself with glory in the three consecutive days that forced Mantua to capitulate, and the Directory is obliged to regard you among the most capable and useful generals of the Republic." In 1808, in memory of Masséna's conduct during this battle, Bonaparte would award him the victory title of Duke of Rivoli. His soldiers had indeed shown remarkable endurance on this occasion, as the historian Stéphane Béraud attests:

Masséna's men, during these three days [from 13 to 15 January 1797], fought at Verona on 13 January, then undertook a night march to fight again at Rivoli on 14 January, before finally taking the route south towards Mantua during the night of 14 to 15 and the whole day on the 15th. They ended this succession of forced marches with the combat of La Favorite which brought about Provera's surrender. These men covered nearly 90 kilometres in 120 hours.

The Habsburg monarchy, alarmed by the French victories in Italy, dispatched to the front its best general, Archduke Charles, to redress the situation. For his part, Bonaparte, who now disposed of significant troops thanks to reinforcements detached from the Army of the Rhine, went on the offensive: Masséna, with 10,000 men, was placed on the French left. His mission was to turn the Archduke's troops as soon as the opportunity presented itself. On 14 March, he defeated Lusignan's corps and prevented the Austrian armies of Tyrol and Friuli from joining up. A few days later, on 22 and 23 March, he seized the Tarvis pass at the Battle of Tarvis, capturing 3,500 Austrians and 25 cannons; on the 30th, he entered Klagenfurt with the commander-in-chief and the Chabot and Guieu divisions. He continued to pursue the imperial forces and occupied Leoben on 7 April, being informed the same day of the signing of the Armistice of Leoben. The advanced elements of his division, positioned at Bruck, were then less than 160 km from Vienna.

=== Trip to Paris and return to Italy ===
Masséna returned to France on 6 May, accompanied by his aide-de-camp Nicolas Ducos. Historians debate the reasons for his departure: according to Georges Six, his mission was to present to the Directory the documents relating to the preliminaries of Leoben, while Prévost proposes a presentation of enemy standards captured during the last campaign. Frédéric Hulot instead suggests the potential delivery of "confidential letter for Barras", as well as a "political information mission". Upon his arrival, Masséna met with the leading directors and was officially received by the authorities at the Luxembourg Palace on 9 May. At the end of the ceremony, he was presented with a sabre of honour. Masséna also approached directors Barras and La Révellière-Lépeaux, who encouraged him to run for a seat in the Directory that May, though in the end a royalist was elected. Disappointed by this failure, Masséna returned to Italy on 12 July with the ratification of the peace accords in his possession. After a stopover at Bonaparte's residence in Mombello, near Milan, he set up his headquarters in Padua.

After the signing of the Treaty of Campo Formio, which brought an end to hostilities, Masséna continued to serve with the troops stationed on the Italian peninsula. The French occupation forces, under the command of General Louis-Alexandre Berthier, invaded the last independent Italian states, in accordance with the Directory's instructions: Masséna was notably involved in the somewhat confused organization of the Roman Republic following the entry of French troops into Rome on 11 February 1798. Pope Pius VI was transferred to Siena and the local republican administration was flanked by a French civil commission charged with monitoring its every move. General Berthier, unhappy with the role assigned to him, ended up handing over command of the French forces in Rome to Masséna.

Very quickly, the territory of the new sister republic was thoroughly pillaged by the occupation troops, with several generals taking part in this ravaging. This behavior was severely condemned by the junior officers and their protests increased after the appointment of Masséna, whose reputation for greed and embezzlement was well known within the army. The French troops stationed in Rome, largely composed of contingents from the Army of the Rhine detached to Italy under Bernadotte's orders, were particularly hostile to Masséna. The presence of these units created a climate of tension, and physical altercations took place with soldiers of the Masséna division. The situation degenerated into a mutiny and the authorities, including the civil commissioners, were unable to restore order. Masséna was then recalled and replaced in Rome by General Gouvion Saint-Cyr. He returned to Antibes where he remained without assignment for several months, not having been chosen to participate in the Egyptian campaign.

=== Decisive victory at Zurich and Siege of Genoa ===
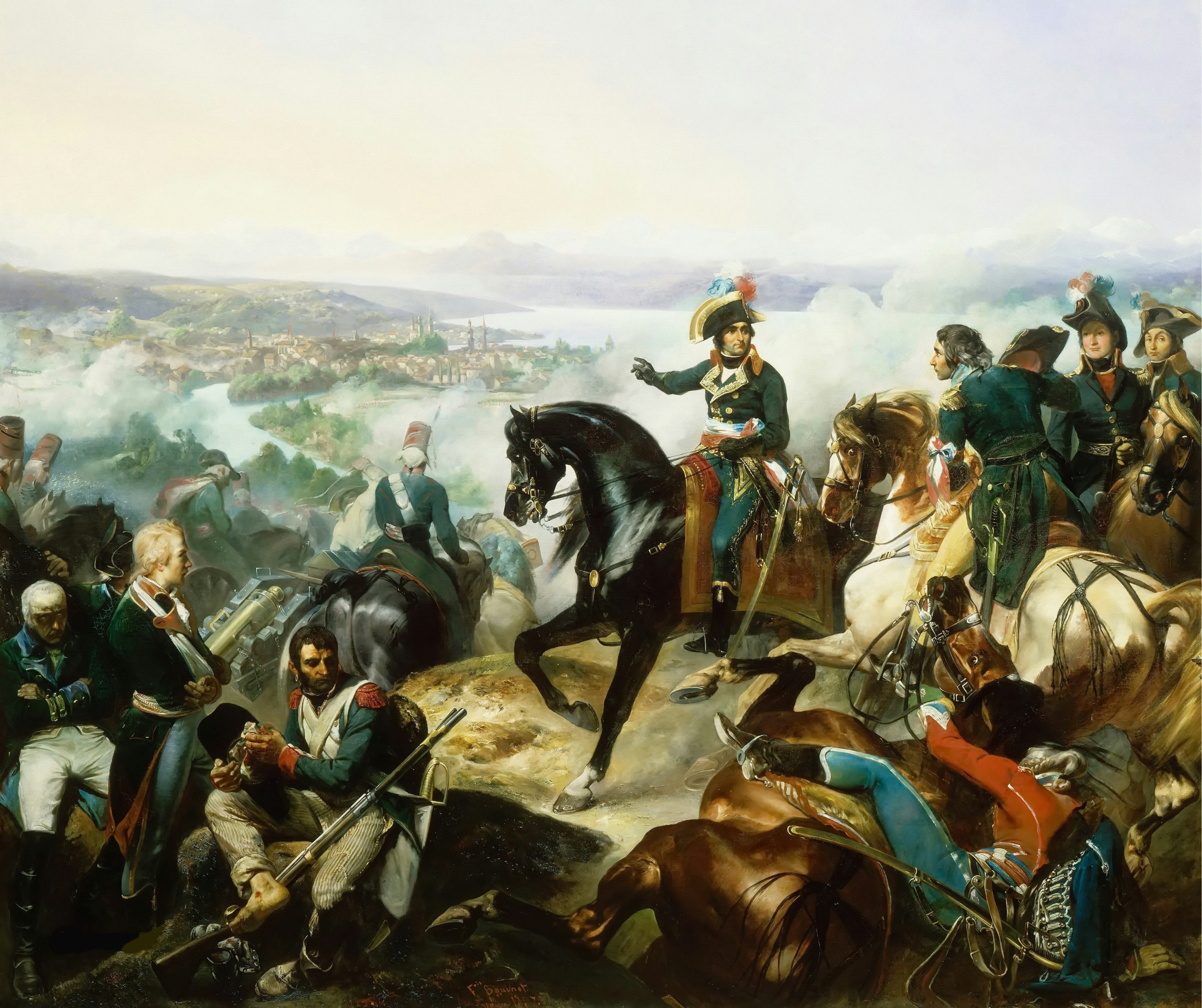
Masséna at the Second Battle of Zurich, 25 September 1799. The Battle of Zurich by François Bouchot, 1835.

With the formation of the Second Coalition against France in 1798, Masséna was detached as a divisional commander to the Army of Mayence in August before taking command of the Army of Helvetia on 9 December. He found himself in a difficult situation facing the Austro-Russian armies led by Archduke Charles and General Korsakov. During this long and difficult campaign, Masséna, in addition to his usual vigour, courage and tenacity, demonstrated great strategic acumen. At the head of around 30,000 men, he first took the initiative in the Grisons before falling back on Zurich in the face of Austrian numerical superiority. He was driven out of the city by Charles at the First Battle of Zurich over 4–6 June. After the Austrian night attack over 4–5 June, both sides rested on 5 June, but when the Austrians resumed their attack on 6 June, Masséna had abandoned the city and taken up positions in the surrounding mountains. He then entrenched himself behind the Limmat and repelled a new attack in August. Becoming aware of the advance of Russian field marshal Alexander Suvorov toward St. Gotthard in September, Masséna had used his troops in the south of Switzerland: General Lecourbe's French division took the Gotthard Pass, which required Suvorov to retake it on 24 September, delaying his advance north towards Zurich. Suvorov then faced General Soult's division blocking the route at Altdorf and then took the Teufelsbrücke in the Schöllenen Gorge. The same day, 25 September, Masséna defeated the Austro-Russians under Korsakov at the Second Battle of Zurich, arguably the greatest French victory of 1799.

Following this success, Masséna organized a series of combined movements to encircle the second Russian army under Suvorov. Unable to break through the French lines and aware of Korsakov's disastrous defeat, Suvorov turned east through the high and difficult Pragel Pass to Glarus. Despite defeats at the simultaneous battles of Klöntal and Muottental, the operation conceived by Masséna was a success: the Russian troops, badly battered, only escaped destruction by carrying out an exhausting retreat east into the 9,000-foot high mountains of the Panikh range. After a difficult march, the Russian army reached Ilanz on 8 October and then crossed the treacherous Panix Pass, abandoning its baggage and all of its artillery. The victory at Zurich, considered Masséna's finest feat of arms, had a decisive influence on the course of the war: through this strategic success, Masséna saved France from a planned invasion and led Tsar Paul I of Russia to withdraw from the Coalition shortly afterwards. Donald D. Howard writes:

The defeat of the Russians and Austrians in this complex operation was the crowning achievement of Masséna's military career. Considering the strength and effectiveness of his foes, his own hazardous position, and the consequences of failure, he meticulously prepared to deliver a series of decisive blows; when they came, he crushed his enemy in detail. This success in Switzerland clearly demonstrated his leadership capabilities as a consummate strategist and tactician; it marked the beginning of the collapse of the Second Coalition, it dissuaded Prussia from joining the coalition, and even more important, it spared France an invasion that might have resulted in the overthrow of the Revolution.

After Bonaparte came to power in France through the coup d'état of 18 Brumaire, Masséna took command of the remaining French forces in Italy. These troops, defeated in several encounters, had established themselves on the Ligurian Apennines. Attacked by General Michael von Melas's Austrian army, Masséna had to withdraw to Genoa where he was besieged, while Bonaparte marched with the Army of the Reserve to Milan. By the end of May, plague had spread throughout Genoa and the civilian population was in revolt. Negotiations were begun for the exchange of prisoners early in June, but the citizens and some of the garrison clamored for capitulation. Unknown to Masséna, the Austrian general Peter Ott had been ordered to raise the siege because Bonaparte had crossed Great St. Bernard Pass and was now threatening the main Austrian army. Describing the situation at Genoa, Ott requested and received permission to continue the siege. On 4 June, with one day's rations remaining, Masséna's negotiator finally agreed to evacuate the French Army from Genoa. However, "if the word capitulation was mentioned or written", Masséna threatened to end all negotiations. Two days later, a few of the French left the city by sea, but the bulk of Masséna's starving and exhausted troops marched out of the city with all their equipment and followed the road along the coast toward France, ending the siege of almost 60 days. The siege was an astonishing demonstration of tenacity, ingenuity, courage, and daring that garnered additional laurels for Masséna and placed him in a category previously reserved for Bonaparte alone.

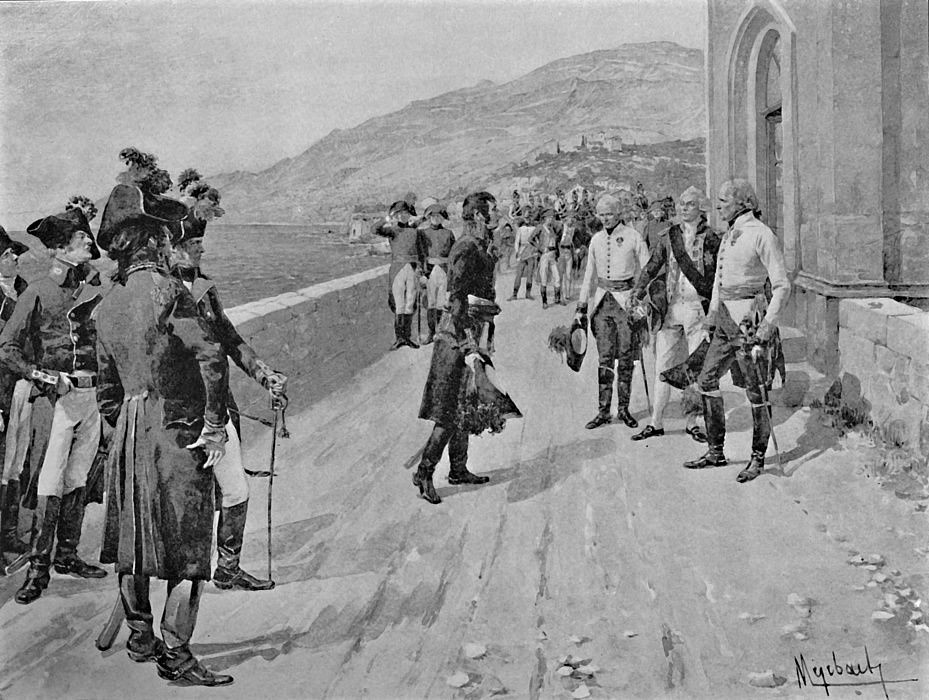
Masséna's capitulation at Cornigliano, near Genoa, in June 1800. Illustration by Felician Myrbach, 1896.

By forcing the Austrians to deploy vast forces against him at Genoa, Masséna made it possible for Bonaparte to cross the Great St. Bernard Pass, surprise the Austrians, and ultimately defeat Melas' Austrian army at Marengo before sufficient reinforcements could be transferred from the siege site. Less than three weeks after the evacuation, Bonaparte wrote to Masséna, "I am not able to give you a greater mark of the confidence I have in you than by giving you command of the first army of the Republic [Army of Italy]." Even the Austrians recognized the significance of Masséna's defense; the Austrian chief of staff declared firmly, "You won the battle, not in front of Alessandria but in front of Genoa." Despite the praise, Bonaparte also criticized Masséna for capitulating too early in his memoirs, contrasting his actions with those of the Gauls under Vercingetorix when besieged by Julius Caesar in the Battle of Alesia.

Masséna was appointed commander of the Army of Italy by Bonaparte when the latter returned to Paris on 24 June 1800. However, the poor financial situation of the army and allegations of corruption weighing on him and his staff led to his recall in August. He then saw himself exonerated from all command and retired to Antibes with his family, before settling in 1801 at the Château de Rueil, in the banlieue of Paris.

== Napoleonic Wars ==
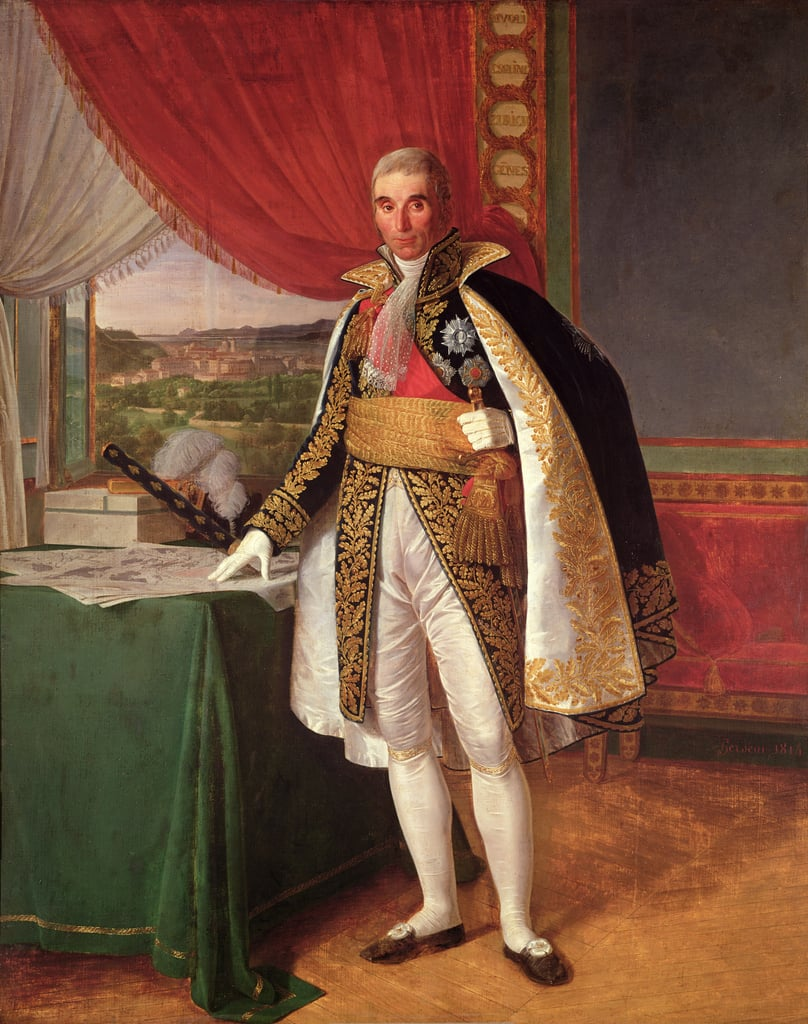
Portrait by Louis Hersent, 1814

Having retired to the countryside, Masséna nevertheless continued to manifest his opposition to the political choices of Bonaparte, for whom he had no particular sympathy; he openly criticized the Concordat of 1801 and, elected the following year as a deputy to the Corps législatif, voted against making Bonaparte consul for life. Georges Six indicates, however, that Masséna only sat in the legislature from 28 July 1803 until 31 December 1807. Despite his strained relations with the head of state, Masséna received the baton of Marshal of the Empire on 19 May 1804, the day after the proclamation of the imperial regime. From his accession to the marshalate, Masséna ceased to appear as a political opponent. Also in 1804, he participated in the reorganization of French Freemasonry and became, in November, "grand representative of the Grand Master of the Supreme Council"; in this capacity, he was one of the negotiators of the concordat established between the Grand Orient of France and the Supreme Council. Under the Empire, he was a member of Sainte Caroline, a highly selective Parisian lodge particularly sought after for its worldliness. He was also "honorary venerable" in various Masonic workshops, such as Les Frères réunis in Paris, La Parfaite Amitié in Toulon, L'Étroite Union in Thouars and Les Vrais Amis réunis in Nice.

On the outbreak of the War of the Third Coalition in 1805, Napoleon entrusted Masséna with command of the Army of Italy. The marshal, who spoke fluent Italian, had in fact a great deal of experience in this theatre of operations. His mission consisted of pinning down Archduke Charles' Austrian troops in this area while awaiting developments of the situation in Germany, where the Emperor himself was heading at the head of the Grande Armée. After increasing his fighting strength to around 50,000 men, the marshal went on the offensive on 18 October and achieved an initial success by forcing the crossing of the Adige at the Battle of Verona. On 30 October, he fought the Archduke at the Battle of Caldiero, the outcome of which was generally favourable to the French, despite the determined resistance of the Austrian troops. He then set off in pursuit of his adversaries, who were retreating towards Ljubljana, while the Austrian capitulation at Ulm opened the road to Vienna for Napoleon. Masséna continued his advance and successively broke through the enemy's defensive lines on the Brenta, the Piave, the Tagliamento and the Isonzo, seeking, in accordance with the Emperor's orders, to prevent the Austrian armies from linking up.

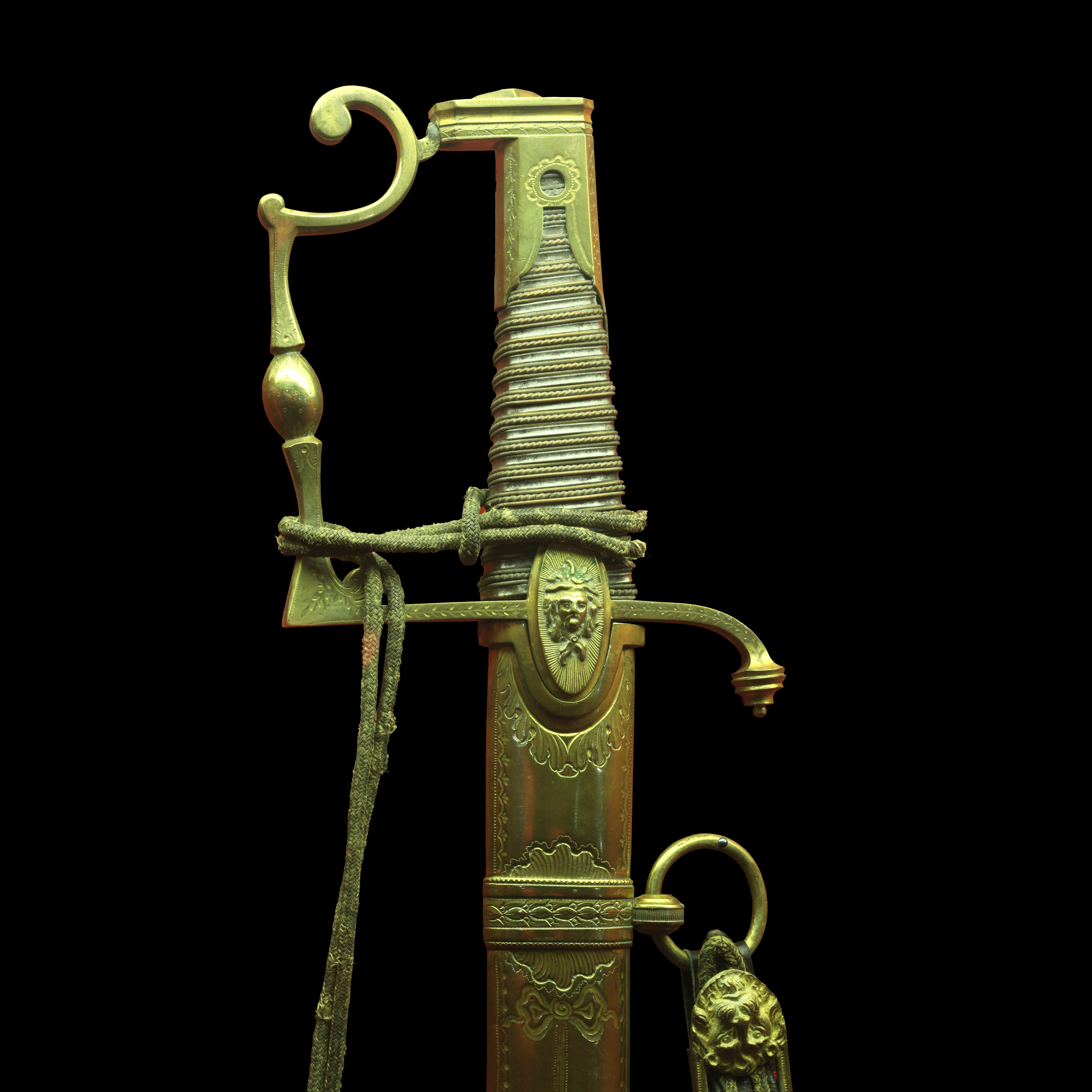
Masséna's sabre, on display at the Musée d'Art et d'Histoire de Neuchâtel

With the end of the war following Napoleon's decisive victory at Austerlitz, Masséna remained in Italy. He received the task of conquering the Kingdom of Naples on 27 December 1805. The aim of this campaign was to dethrone the Bourbon dynasty in favor of a new French satellite kingdom led by Joseph Bonaparte, Napoleon's elder brother. The French invasion of Naples initially unfolded without great difficulty: King Ferdinand IV fled to Sicily and the fortress of Gaeta capitulated in July 1806 after a siege of almost five months. In reality, the situation was far from being stabilised due to the insurrection of pro-Bourbon partisans in the Basilicata and Calabria regions, with those in the latter benefiting from the support of a British expeditionary corps. The conflict quickly acquired a fierce and merciless dimension, leading both sides to commit numerous exactions against the civilian population. Masséna harshly suppressed the revolts, devastated occupied territories and adopted draconian measures which sometimes resulted in mass executions; the insurgent leader Fra Diavolo was hanged and the town of Lauria was completely ravaged in a massacre committed by French troops.

Despite these brutal methods, the Napoleonic army struggled to contain the insurrection. Masséna had to detach part of his forces to Calabria under the command of General Reynier, which did not prevent the British from holding on to the tip of the Italian Peninsula until 1808. Meanwhile, the marshal seized the property of the vanquished in southern Italy and even authorized himself to issue import licenses, in total contradiction with the Continental Blockade policy applied against British shipping. On bad terms with King Joseph and opposed to a planned landing in Sicily, Masséna resigned on 15 December 1806 and returned to France at the beginning of the following year. In late February he was called to command the V Corps, stationed in Poland, which constituted the right wing of the Grande Armée. Charged with covering Warsaw and keeping General Essen's Russian corps in place, Masséna's troops did not play a very active part in the 1807 campaign which resulted in the defeat of Russia and Prussia.

Masséna, disappointed at having been relegated to a secondary post, also struggled with the harsh Polish cold. Suffering from a serious lung disease, he was granted leave and returned to France in July. He then devoted himself to managing his fortune and acquired that same year the Hôtel de Bentheim, located in the Faubourg Saint-Germain of Paris. As a reward for his services, Masséna was made Duke of Rivoli (duc de Rivoli) on 19 March 1808. In September, he nearly lost an eye when Napoleon accidentally fired a rifle at him while hunting near Paris, although Masséna diplomatically preferred to attribute responsibility to Berthier.

=== Fifth Coalition ===
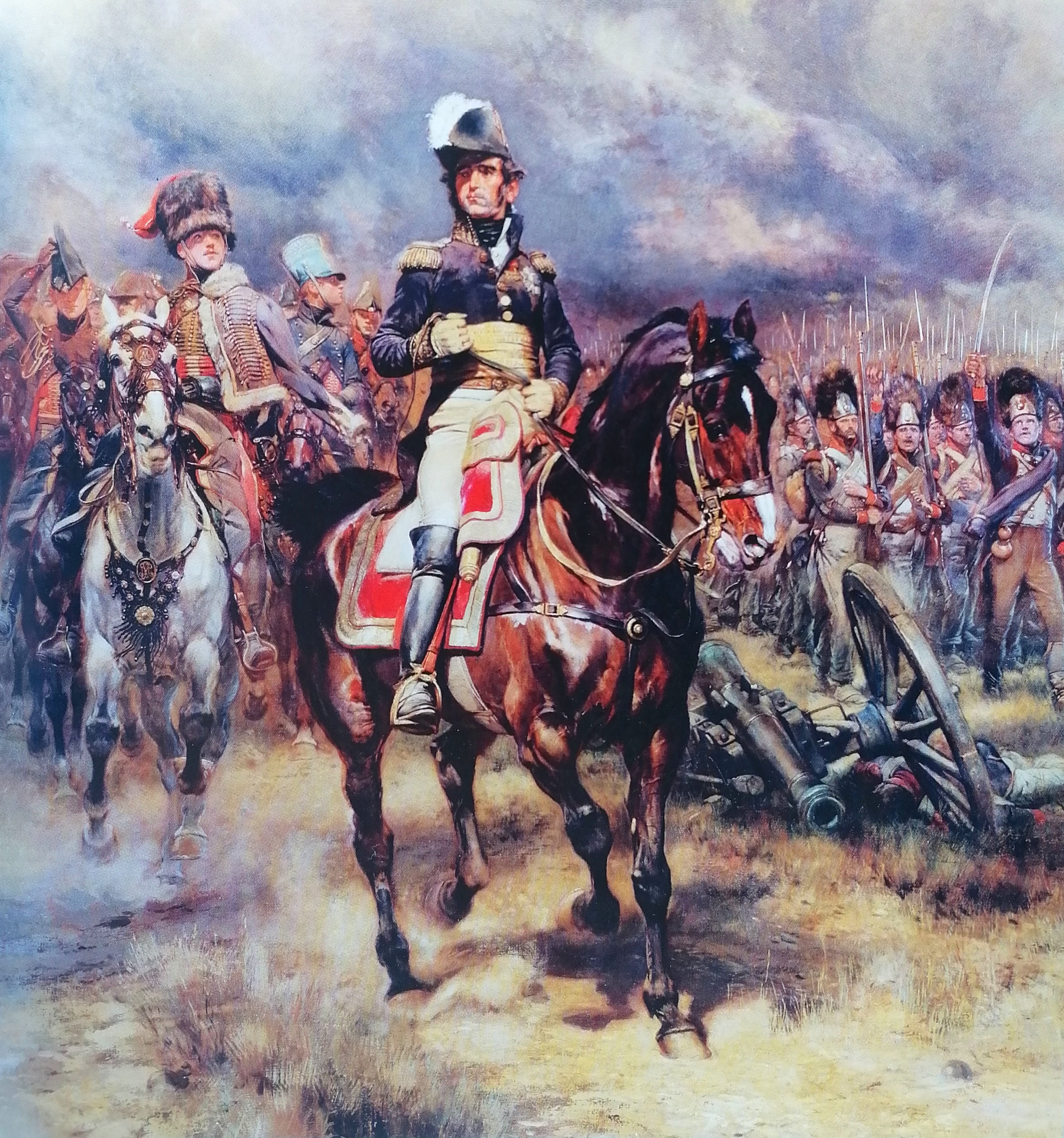
Marshal Masséna at the Battle of Essling. Painting by Édouard Detaille.

Masséna regained operational command during the war against Austria in 1809. Napoleon entrusted him with the IV Corps, a unit composed mostly of conscripts. The marshal made his way through Bavaria but, despite his and Napoleon's efforts, he had little involvement in the first phase of the campaign. During the battles of Landshut and Eckmühl, Masséna's corps, which advanced by forced marches under the energetic leadership of its commander, did not arrive in time to complete the encirclement of the Austrians, who managed to retreat north of Ratisbonne.

After participating in the march on Vienna, Masséna fought the bloody Battle of Ebersberg on 3 May against the Austrian rearguard, where he was criticized by the Emperor for having prematurely ordered a frontal attack on the enemy positions. He also played a leading role at the Battle of Aspern-Essling. Masséna led the first crossing of the Danube in front of Vienna and repelled Austrian attacks on the village of Aspern; during the fighting, the marshal rallied his men by fighting among them as a rifleman. The collapse of the bridges however rendered the situation extremely perilous for the French troops on the north bank. Following the mortal wounding of Marshal Lannes and Napoleon's decision to suspend the offensive, Masséna took command of the bridgehead and skillfully organized a retreat to the island of Lobau, in the middle of the Danube. In the weeks following this setback, Masséna worked closely with the Emperor to consolidate the French positions on the island and prepare a new crossing of the river, further downstream.

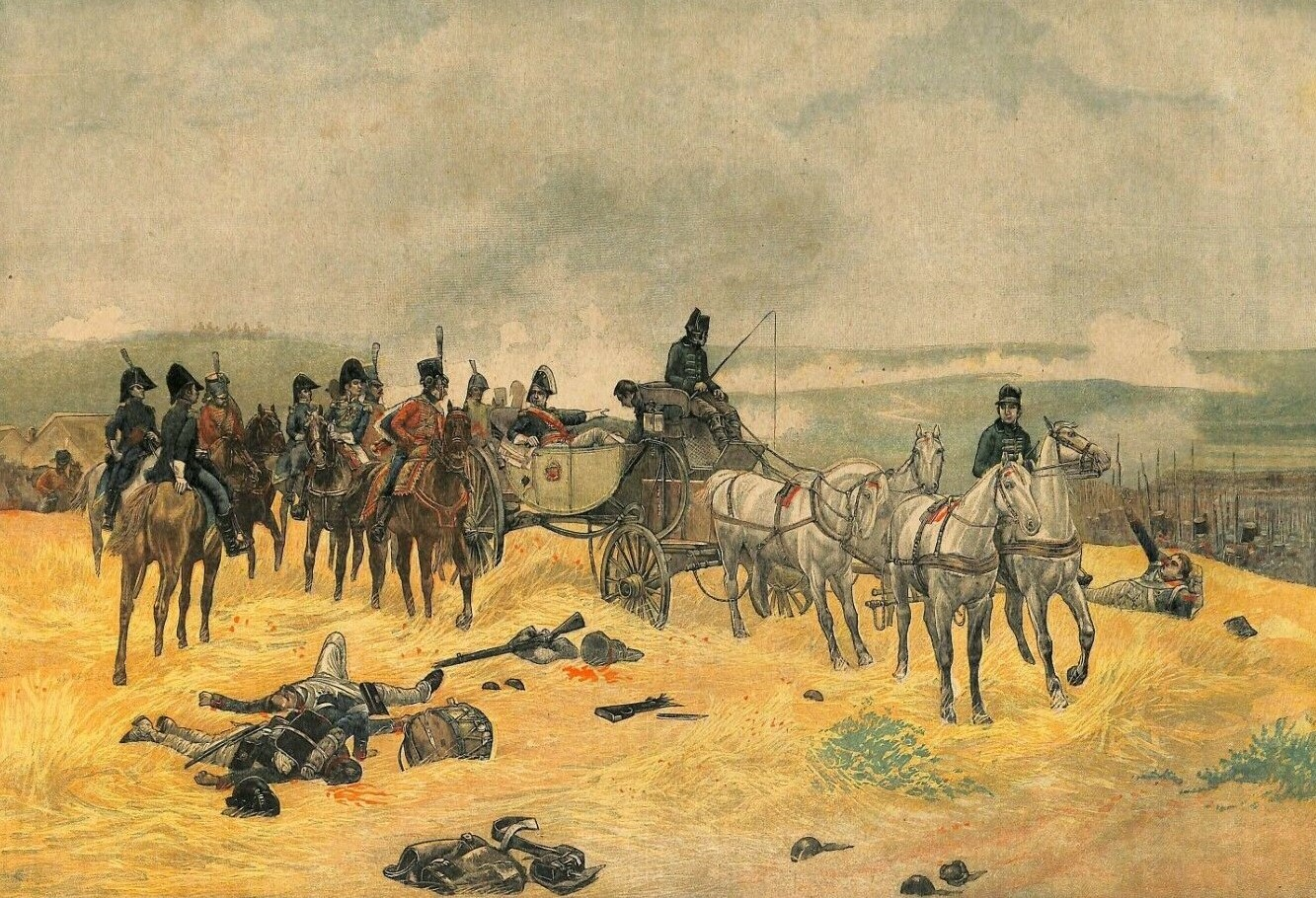
Masséna giving orders from a carriage at the Battle of Wagram, 6 July 1809

A second offensive was planned for July 1809. A few days before the start of operations, Masséna fell from his horse which had stepped into a rabbit hole and was seriously injured in the leg. He refused, however, to return to Vienna for treatment and continued to command the IV Corps from a carriage. On 5 July, the first day of the Battle of Wagram, Masséna's troops drove Klenau's Austrian corps out of Aspern. The next day, when Bernadotte's Saxon units had just lost the village of Aderklaa, Masséna came to support him with two divisions and fought a ferocious battle for possession of the town. During the action, his carriage was targeted by enemy cavalrymen. With a pistol, he shot a hussar who was threatening him in the head. On his left, the Boudet division was pushed out of Aspern and Essling by the Austrians. Faced with the gravity of the situation, Napoleon personally went to Masséna and climbed into the carriage alongside the marshal; from this improvised headquarters exposed to enemy fire, the Emperor informed Masséna of his intention to break the Austrian line through the center and ordered him to retake Essling. The marshal ultimately succeeded in stopping the enemy advance, stabilizing the situation in the Essling sector, while the retreat initiated by Archduke Charles gave victory to Napoleon.

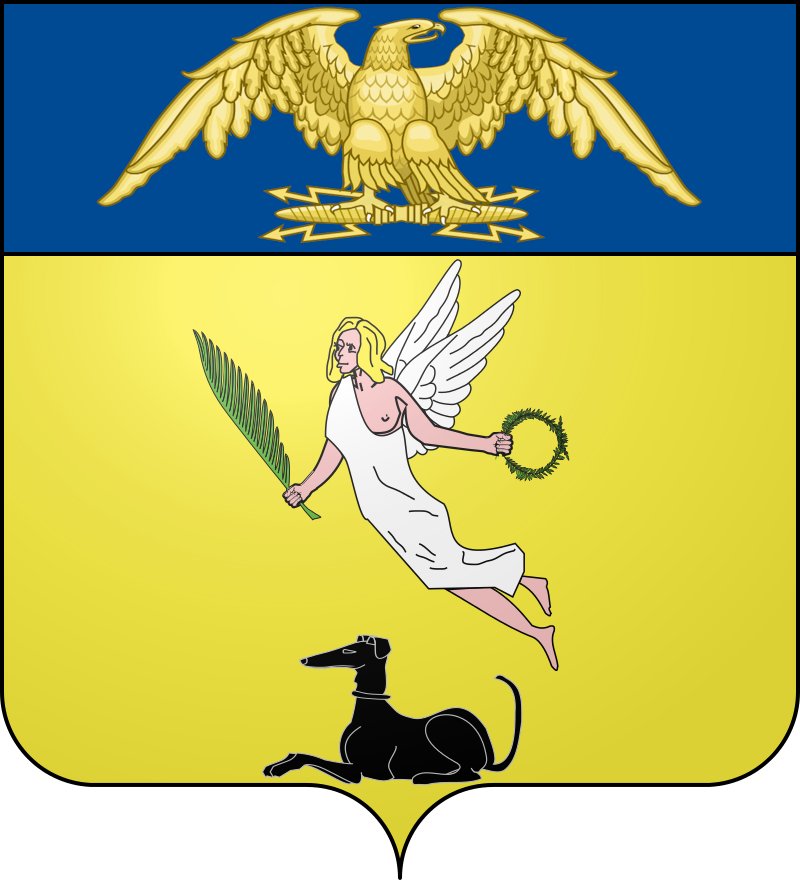
Masséna's coat of arms as Prince of Essling, featuring the allegory of Victory in reference to his nickname, "the dear child of victory".

The next day, Masséna's IV Corps set off in pursuit of the Austrian army, which it seriously engaged on 11 July at the Battle of Znaim. An armistice signed on the 12th, however, brought an end to the fighting and Masséna, after reorganizing his troops in Moravia, returned to France in early November 1809. On 14 October 1809, Napoleon rewarded Masséna with a second, now princely, victory title, Prince of Essling (prince d'Essling), in recognition of his role during the campaign and his brilliant performance at Essling in particular.

=== Portuguese campaign ===
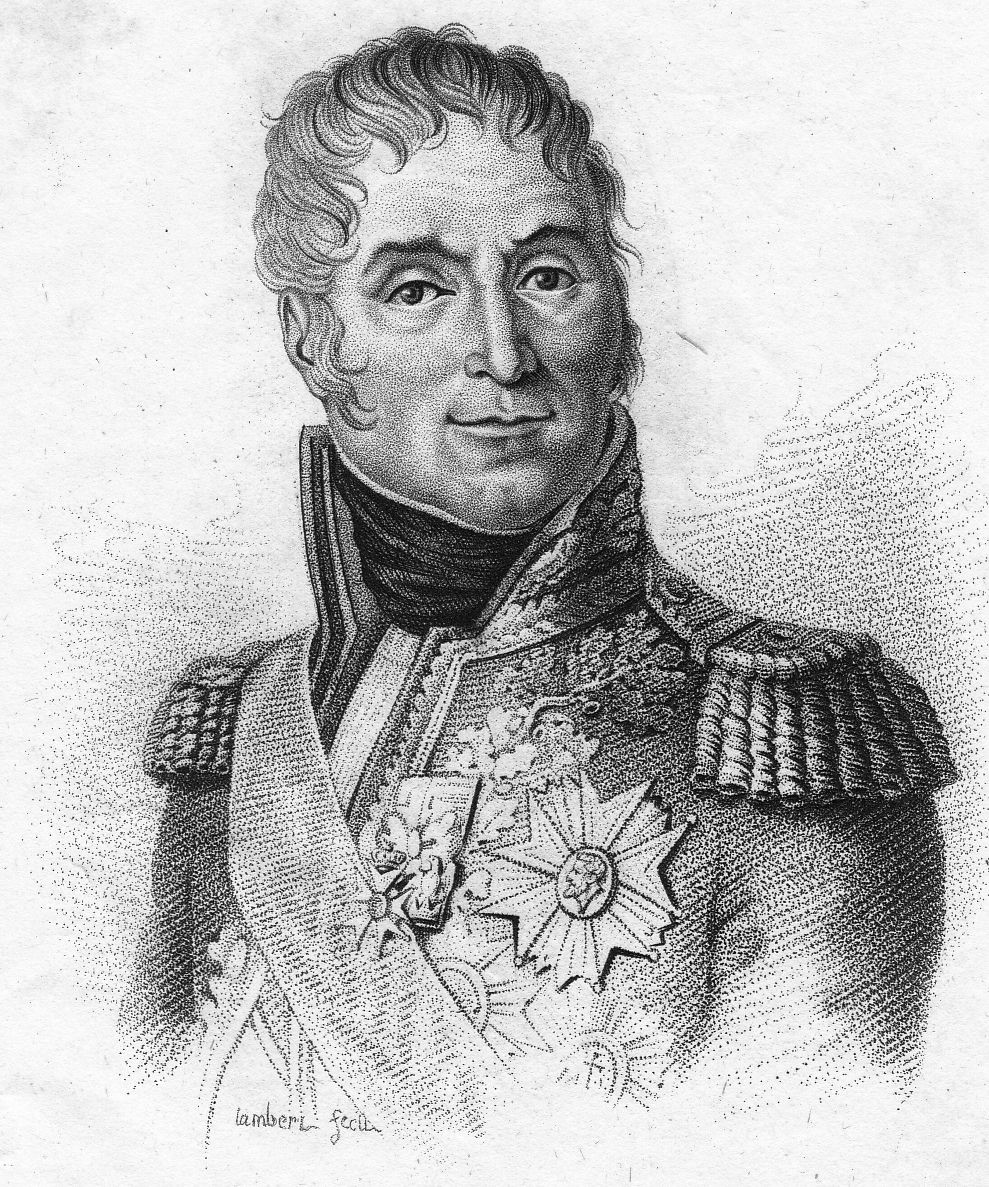
Portrait by Charles-Aimé Forestier, c. 1820

On 17 April 1810, Napoleon designated Masséna to break the stalemate in the Peninsular War and entrusted him with the mission of reconquering Portugal, thus constituting the third French invasion of this country, after failed attempts by Junot (who had initially managed to occupy the country) in 1808 and Soult in 1809. The Marshal was given command of the Army of Portugal, composed of Ney's VI Corps, Reynier's II Corps and Junot's VIII Corps, theoretically constituting a considerable force of over 130,000 men. Masséna, who had openly expressed to the Emperor his lack of enthusiasm for this assignment and the difficult task ahead, set to work with his usual vigour. However, the Prince of Essling seemed physically and morally diminished; In addition, the presence in the army of his mistress at the time, Eugénie Renique, disguised as an officer, caused a scandal. Faced with the lack of cooperation from his subordinates, supply issues and the instability of the lines of communication in an area devoid of resources and infested by guerrillas, the marshal could only gather about 60,000 men for the invasion of Portugal, where he was preparing to face the Anglo-Portuguese troops of General Wellington.

After waiting until the harvest period to allow his troops to resupply, Masséna succeeded in seizing Ciudad Rodrigo on 10 July and then Almeida on 27 August, before entering Portugal in September. Faced with his opponent's advance, Wellington quickly retreated towards Lisbon, making sure to destroy the crops before the French arrived. The British general finally established himself in front of Coimbra with the intention of halting Masséna and, entrenched on a height, repelled the marshal's assaults at the Battle of Bussaco on 27 September 1810. Masséna, noting the futility of attacking the solid British infantry head-on, organized a manoeuvre which allowed him to outflank the enemy defences and resume his march towards Lisbon, while Wellington managed to retreat with his army intact.

At the head of a smaller army than before and weakened by food shortage, Masséna continued his advance and arrived near Lisbon, but on the way came up against the lines of Torres Vedras which Wellington had erected to protect access to the Portuguese capital. While the Allied troops were supplied by sea and thus had sufficient resources to sustain a siege, the situation of the French army, stuck in front of the fortifications and in the grip of a logistical crisis, became increasingly precarious. After having uselessly idled in front of the lines for over a month, Masséna, considering his situation hopeless and having been refused the artillery park requested from Joseph Bonaparte (then King of Spain), decided to abandon the siege on 14 November and retreated to Santarém, where he remained until 6 March 1811 in difficult conditions. His army then withdrew to Almeida before heading towards Salamanca where it arrived on 10 April.

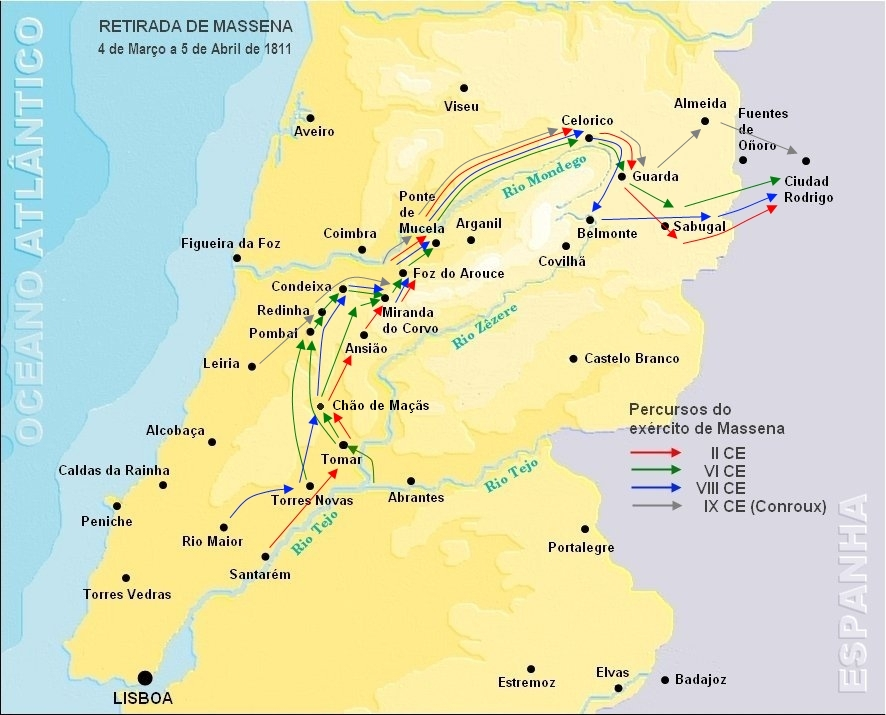
Retreat of Masséna's Army of Portugal between 4 March and 5 April 1811

In the meantime, Masséna had a violent argument with Ney, who, despite his brilliant performance during the campaign, had not appreciated serving under the Prince of Essling's orders; infuriated, Masséna relieved Ney of his command and sent him back to France. Timidly pursued by Wellington, Masséna decided to resume the offensive in order to relieve blockaded Almeida and engaged the Anglo-Portuguese army at the Battle of Fuentes de Oñoro on 3 May 1811. During this confrontation that lasted three days, Masséna succeeded in exploiting a weakness in Wellington's line, but the inaction of General Lepic's cavalry and the attitude of Marshal Bessières, who refused to support him, finally forced him to withdraw.

Napoleon, deeply disappointed by the failure of the invasion of Portugal, openly expressed his discontent to Masséna, who finally had to hand over his command to Marshal Marmont on 11 May 1811. Back in France, he was poorly received by the Emperor, who declared to him: "So, Prince of Essling, you are no longer Masséna?" Masséna's defeat in Portugal, partly due to his mistakes but also to practical difficulties and poor cooperation from his lieutenants, brought an end to his career on the battlefield.

== Later life ==
Retiring to his château in Rueil with his family, Masséna rarely appeared at court and began writing his memoirs while taking care of his children's education. He was not employed in the Russian campaign in 1812. In July of the same year, the situation in Spain deteriorated sharply with Marmont's defeat at the Battle of Salamanca. Cambacérès, who presided the regency council in the Emperor's absence, decided to send Masséna back to the Iberian Peninsula with the title of general-in-chief. The marshal accepted the post, but, weakened by a high fever while in Bayonne, asked to be relieved of his command in late August. He then spent some time in his native Nice before returning to his estate in Rueil a few months later. On 16 April 1813, the Emperor appointed him commander of the 8th military division, based in Toulon. In this capacity, Masséna foiled a royalist conspiracy to hand over the port of Toulon to the British and to provoke an insurrection in Provence, a plot whose main leaders were tried and executed in December 1813; he also had to deal with attempted incursions by the British Mediterranean Fleet and track down conscription evaders.

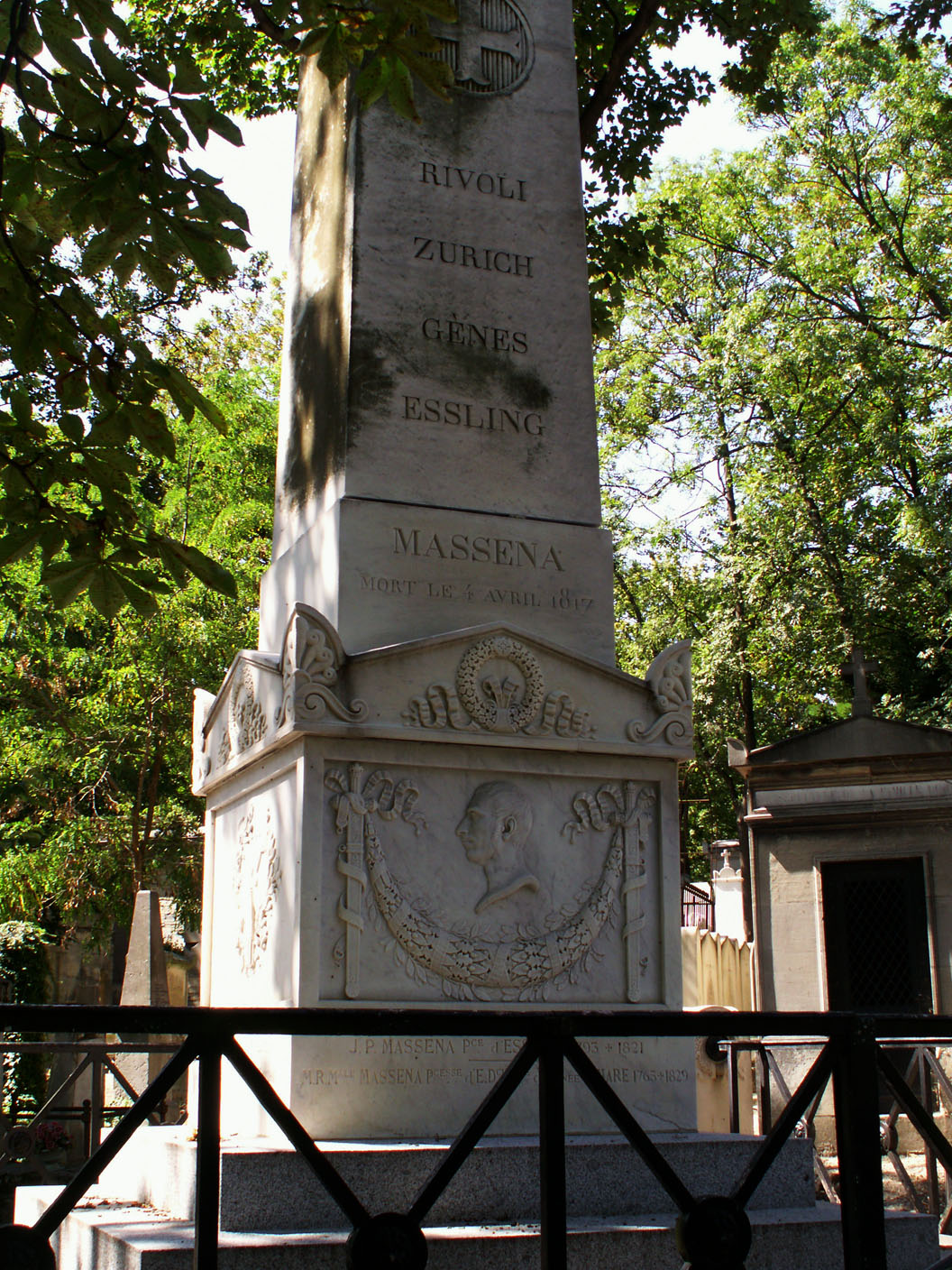
Masséna's tomb at the Père Lachaise Cemetery

After Napoleon's abdication in April 1814, Masséna was kept in his functions by Louis XVIII who made him a Grand Cross of the Order of Saint Louis. On 20 January 1815, the king also granted him naturalization, since Nice had been returned to Sardinia under the Treaty of Paris. Masséna was elevated to the peerage soon afterwards. He remained loyal to the Bourbons well into 1815, initially refusing any appointments during the Hundred Days, though he later attended the Champ de Mai ceremony and sat in the Chamber of Peers. During the session of 22 June, when General La Bédoyère argued in favour of the rights of the King of Rome to the crown, Masséna exclaimed: "young man, you forget yourself!" With Napoleon's definitive abdication the same day, the Prince of Essling was appointed commander of the National Guard of Paris by the Provisional Government and participated in this capacity in a war council at La Villette, which saw the marshals and generals charged with the defense of Paris opt to surrender the capital. After serving briefly as military governor of Paris, he was placed back at the head of the 8th military division by the Second Restoration. Masséna was one of the four marshals present at Ney's court martial and, along with the majority of his comrades, declared himself incompetent, deferring judgment to the Chamber of Peers. Denounced to the Chambers as not having opposed Napoleon's return, he was dismissed from his duties and had to defend himself from accusations of bribery brought against him by the ultra-royalists. Masséna died of tuberculosis on 4 April 1817 in Paris, aged 58. His funeral was held on 6 April at the Père-Lachaise Cemetery, with a eulogy delivered by General Thiébault.

== Assessment ==
=== Military record ===
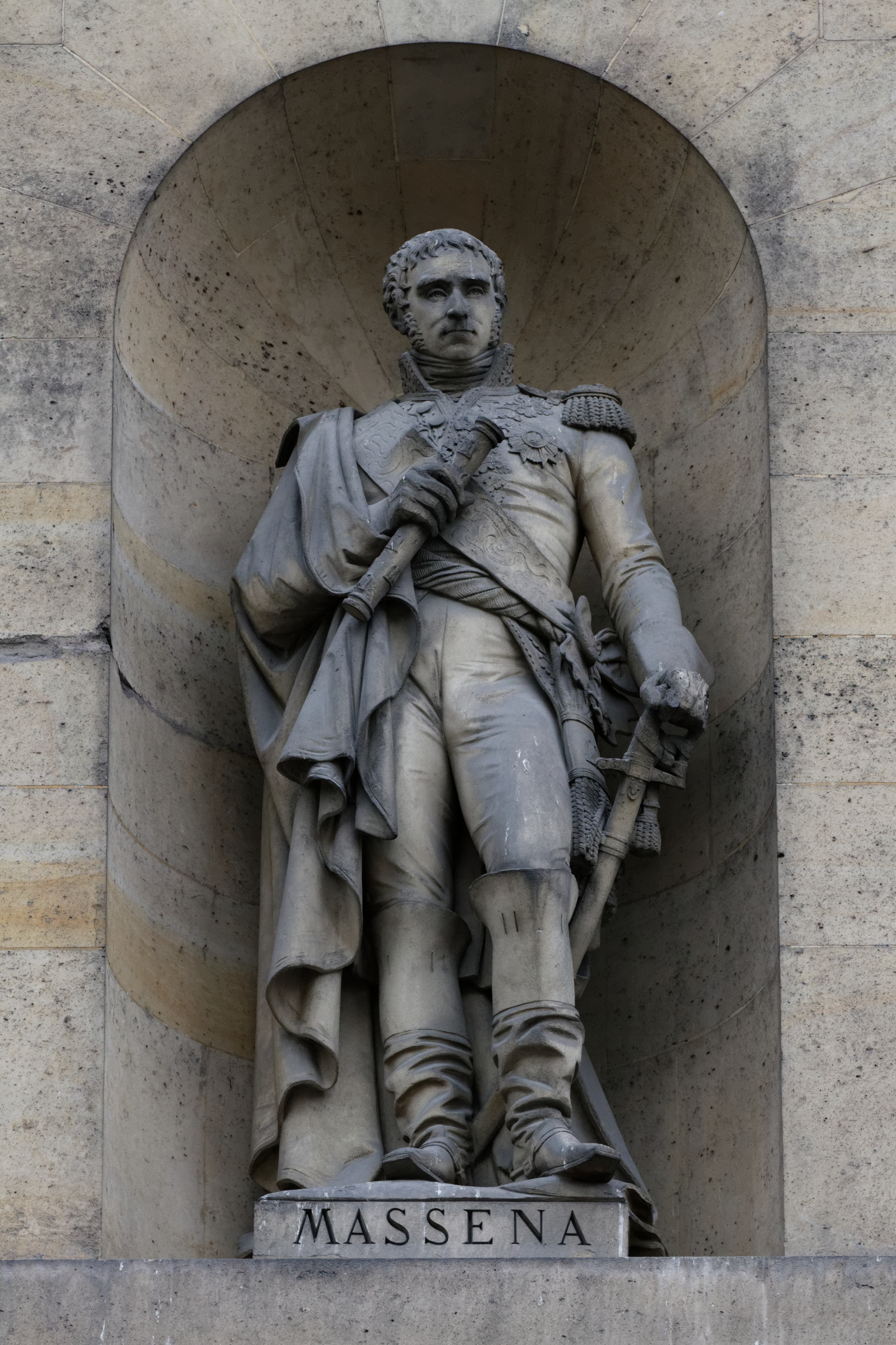
Statue of Masséna by Calmels in a façade of the Louvre Palace

Selected events

Masséna was endowed with extraordinary courage and firmness, which seemed to increase in excess of danger. When conquered, he was always as ready to fight the battle again as though he had been the conqueror.

— Napoleon's remarks on Masséna from the Mémorial de Sainte-Hélène.

Figuring among the most famous generals of the Revolution and the Empire, Masséna revealed on the battlefield his talents as a strategist and tactician. His military career is unique among Napoleon's marshals, and few European military leaders can claim a level of success comparable to Masséna's. This fame, added to his many feats of arms, helped the careers of many: most French marshals of the time served under his command at some point. David G. Chandler cites him, apart from Napoleon, as one of the two great captains of the French Army along with Davout, and one of his most formidable adversaries, the Duke of Wellington, admitted that he "did not sleep easy" while facing Masséna on a battlefield.

Similarly, Charles Oman describes Masséna as a "great general", adding: "Of all the marshals of the Empire he was undoubtedly the most capable; Davoust [sic] and Soult, with all their abilities, were not up to his level. As a proof of his boldness and rapid skill in seizing an opportunity the battle of Zurich is sufficient to quote; for his splendid obstinacy the defence of Genoa at the commencement of his career has its parallel in the long endurance before the lines of Torres Vedras at its end". During his exile in Saint Helena, Napoleon himself considered Masséna his best general, at least for a time, and always expressed a high opinion of his military skills, judging him to be one of the few, alongside Marshals Murat, Lannes and Davout, capable of temporarily assuming supreme command in the theatre of operations during his absence. At the indecisive Battle of Caldiero in 1805, although outnumbered, Masséna prevented Archduke Charles's army from coming to the aid of the bulk of the Austrian forces in central Europe. In 1809, the retreat of the French troops that he oversaw after the Battle of Essling in particularly perilous conditions, as well as his attitude on this occasion, were considered remarkable. Frédéric Hulot describes Masséna as an "admirable tactician [...] gifted with a sense of terrain", who also possessed a "sang-froid that allowed him to maintain all his lucidity in the most critical situations."

While his campaigns of 1805 and 1809 are viewed favourably, Masséna's failure in the Portuguese campaign of 1810 cast a shadow over his career. He appeared worn out and prematurely aged: "he was only 52, but he looked 60," remarked one of his subordinates, General Maximilien Sébastien Foy. Richard Humble is critical of Masséna's conduct at the Battle of Buçaco, particularly his decision to attack the Anglo-Portuguese lines head-on, calling this failure one of the most disappointing performances of his career. Donald Horward defends him, writing: "Although his characteristic tenacity was reflected throughout the campaign, the strategy for the invasion had been dictated by Napoleon and implemented by his état-major and corps commanders; his army had been abandoned within sight of its goal; the goals of the campaign were reversed, and his great military reputation had been undermined through the neglect of others".

Despite these setbacks, Masséna returned to his best at the Battle of Fuentes de Oñoro, where he pushed Wellington back into his entrenchments as no other French commander had done before him, with victory narrowly eluding the marshal. For this reason, he figures, according to Humble, among the best marshals deployed to the Iberian Peninsula, behind Soult but ahead of Marmont and Suchet, and as the best French tactician in the sector. Oleg Sokolov recognizes Masséna's remarkable military capabilities, charisma and prestigious career, but still considers his talents inferior to those of Davout and Suchet. Napoleon, who complained in the latter part of his career of the marshal's physical and intellectual decline, nevertheless paid him homage by speaking of him as "a man of superior talent", adding: "In the midst of the dying and the dead, of balls sweeping away those who encircled him, then Masséna was himself—gave his orders, and made his dispositions with the greatest sang-froid and judgment".

=== Character ===
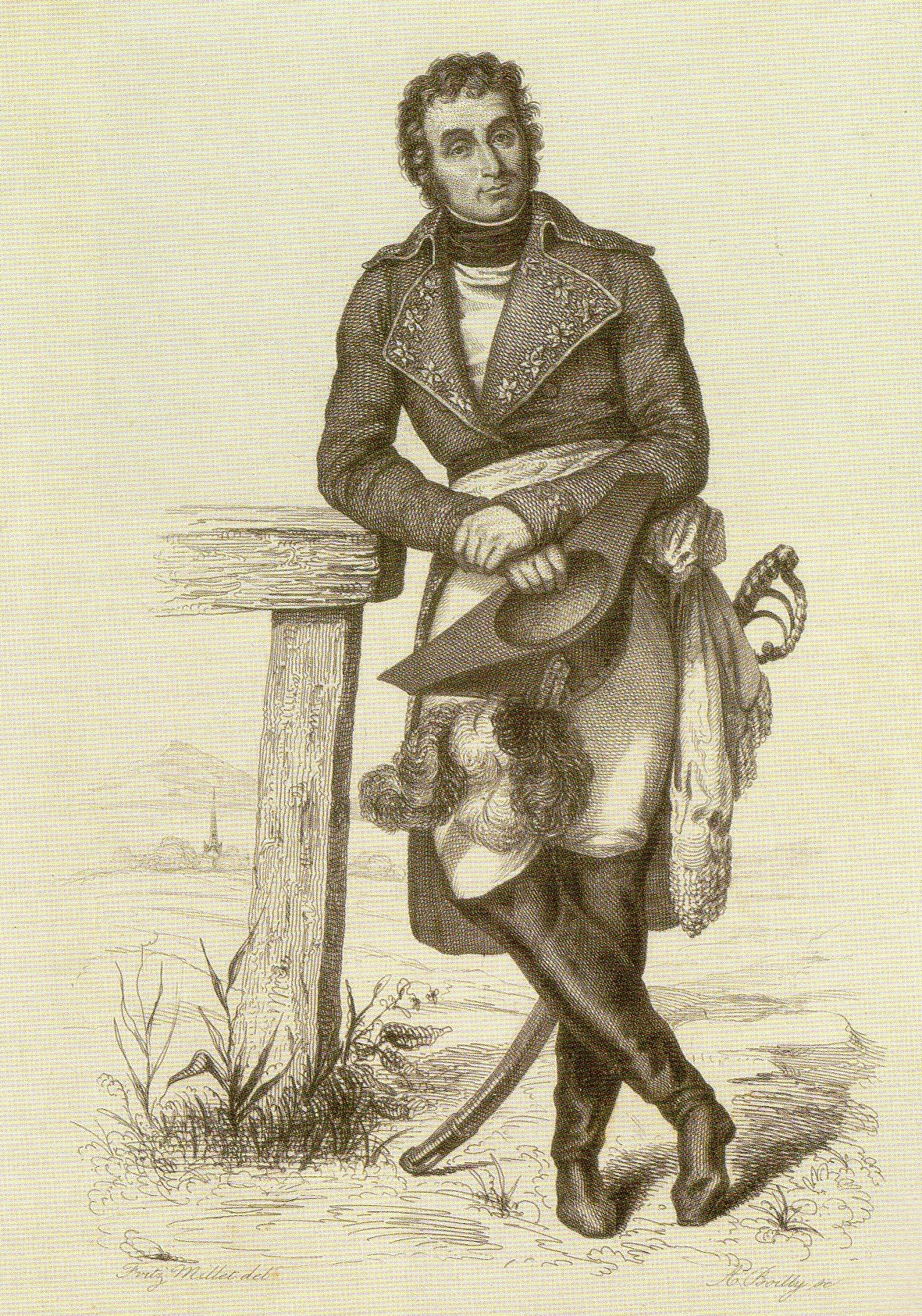
Portrait by Fritz Millet

While his military talents have received praise, Masséna's character was severely tainted by his greed and his taste for pillage. John R. Elting writes that "besides soldiering, he had two interests: money and women". Masséna was indeed known throughout the army as an insatiable looter, avaricious and anxious to enrich himself through material goods; during the Italian campaign of 1796–1797, certain towns and regions occupied by his division were completely ransacked and numerous complaints were addressed to Bonaparte, who nevertheless preferred to turn a blind eye to the actions of his subordinate. His prevarications of all kinds, well known to his contemporaries, earned him the derisive nickname "the rotten child of victory" (l'enfant pourri de la victoire). He also did not hesitate to resort to brutal methods, notably during the Calabrian insurrection, where his troops pillaged and burned the town of Lauria and massacred many of its inhabitants. These measures were however not systematic: in July 1810, Masséna called off a planned assault on Ciudad Rodrigo when its surrender was announced, thus avoiding a complete sack of the city.

Condemnations of the Masséna's excesses often came from Napoleon himself, who said that "this man [Masséna] does not have the necessary elevation to lead Frenchmen"; in Saint Helena, the former emperor called him a "thief" and declared of him: "he would have been a great man, if his brilliant qualities had not been tarnished by avarice". During his command in southern Italy in 1806, Masséna made a profit of three million francs by circumventing the law on imports, and Napoleon had to take action to force him to return this sum to the army treasury. After the Battle of Wagram, Napoleon asked the marshal to reward the two coachmen of his carriage who had exposed themselves throughout the fighting, but Masséna only agreed to grant an annuity to each after numerous recriminations.

Under the Empire, Masséna amassed an enormous fortune, thanks to his endowments and pensions, his salaries as marshal and member of the Legion of Honor, as well as various sums from pillaging. He was thus the second largest beneficiary of imperial endowments (after Berthier), which amounted to 933,375 francs over the entire period. The total amount of his annual income is estimated at 683,375 francs. Masséna was able to purchase the Château de Rueil in Hauts-de-Seine, the Hôtel de Bentheim on Rue Saint-Dominique in Paris, and a country house on the outskirts of the capital.

Richard Dunn Pattison describes Masséna as "lean and spare, below middle height, with a highly expressive Italian face, a good mouth, an aquiline nose, and black sparkling eyes". Elting emphasizes that he "carried his head high and cocked a little to the left, and there was something of an eagle in his glance". Of a small stature, 1.62 metres (5.3 ft), Masséna was a charismatic figure and was capable of galvanizing his soldiers. His womanizing led him, since Italy, to be followed on campaign by a mistress, Silvia Cepolini, which earned him a formal reprimand from Bonaparte. After becoming a marshal, Masséna relapsed by appearing in the army with Eugénie Renique, a young dancer at the Paris Opera, whose presence at his side was poorly received by the soldiers. This inappropriate situation reached its peak during the Portuguese campaign, where, according to the memoirists, the relationship between the Prince of Essling and his mistress tended to spill over into military operations themselves.

Despite his infidelities, Masséna remained on good terms with his wife, who had decided to turn a blind eye to her husband's extramarital affairs; "thus they reached the end of their common existence without having known either the great passion or the quarrel that too commonly follows it," writes Louis Chardigny. In his family, the marshal showed himself to be an attentive father, and was mindful of the education of his children. Illiterate during his youth, Masséna retained a very basic education and a profound disinterest in reading, although he spoke French and Italian fluently. The Prince of Liechtenstein, who met him at the time of the signing of the Armistice of Znaim in 1809, reproached him for speaking like a "coachman".

Masséna's relationship with Napoleon was marked by some distrust; the Emperor, although admiring his military talents, always maintained distant relations with him, possibly due to jealousy of his lieutenant's previous exploits, at a time when he himself was still a simple officer. In fact, Masséna and his wife made few appearances at court, where Masséna, unlike most marshals, did not obtain any honorary position. He had few close friends among the marshals and even attracted deep enmities; his relations with Ney and Berthier, in particular, were awful. He knew however, when necessary, how to highlight the actions of his subordinates, and took care to surround himself with competent officers such as Reille, Sainte-Croix and Pelet.

== Marriage and issue ==
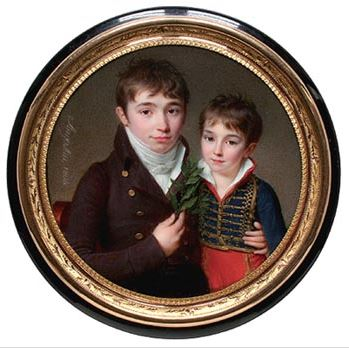
Masséna's sons Jacques Prosper (1793–1821) and François Victor (1799–1863). Miniature portrait by Jean-Baptiste Jacques Augustin, 1806.

On 10 August 1789, Masséna married Anne Marie Rosalie Lamare (1765–1829), the daughter of a master surgeon from Antibes. They had four children:

- Marie Anne Élisabeth Masséna (8 July 1790 – 18 March 1794).
- Jacques Prosper Masséna (Antibes, 25 June 1793 – 13 May 1821), 2nd prince d'Essling from 3 July 1818.
- Victoire Thècle Masséna (Antibes, 28 September 1794 – 18 March 1857), who married General Honoré Charles Reille, a former aide-de-camp of Masséna and Napoleon, on 12 September 1814. They had four children, including René Reille (1835–1898), who married Geneviève Soult de Dalmatie (1844–1910), daughter of Napoléon-Hector Soult de Dalmatie and granddaughter of Marshal Soult. Another son, Gustave-Charles-Prosper Reille (1818–1895), married his first cousin Françoise Anne Masséna (1824–1902), daughter of François Victor Masséna (1799–1863).
- François Victor Masséna (1799–1863) (Antibes, 2 April 1799 – 16 April 1863), who succeeded his father as 2nd duc de Rivoli and his brother as 3rd prince d'Essling. He married Anne Debelle, daughter of General Jean-François Joseph Debelle, on 19 April 1823.

== Writings ==
Masséna authored a work titled Mémoire de M. le Maréchal Masséna, sur les événements qui ont eu lieu en Provence, pendant les mois de mars et d'avril 1815, published in 1816. His memoirs (Mémoires de Masséna), published between 1849 and 1850, were in fact written by General Jean-Baptiste-Frédéric Koch. They were reissued between 1966 and 1967.

== Commemoration ==
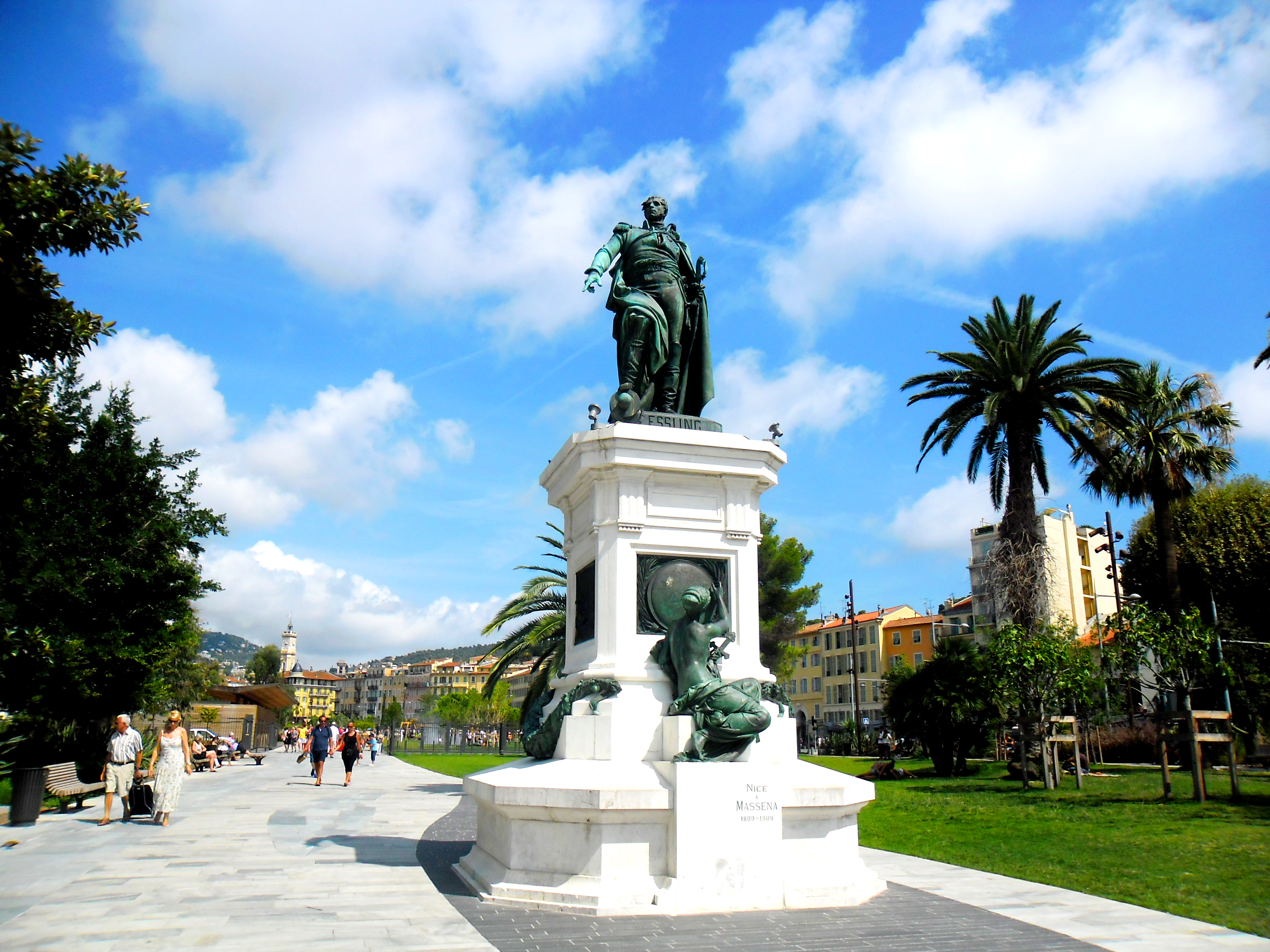
Statue of Masséna in his native Nice by Albert-Ernest Carrier-Belleuse

Masséna is the namesake of one of the Boulevards of the Marshals that circle Paris, having also a bridge named after him. The village of Massena in New York was settled by French lumbermen in the early 19th century and named in Masséna's honor. Massena, Iowa, also in the United States and in turn named for the community in New York, honors Masséna with a portrait of him in Centennial Park. His birthplace, Nice, is the location of Place Masséna, also named after him. The palatial Museé Masséna in Nice houses memorabilia of Masséna's life but was constructed by his grandson and is named for him.

Masséna had a French battleship named after him. The ship was built as part of the 1890 French naval construction program. It was the fourth of five ships, and was designed by naval architect Louis de Bussy. It did not see major combat, and its final service was as a breakwater in the Gallipoli campaign in 1915.

== In literature ==
- Masséna is mentioned and/or appears in several of Sir Arthur Conan Doyle's Brigadier Gerard stories, including How the Brigadier Saved the Army (1902).
- Masséna appears as a minor character in Bernard Cornwell's novels Sharpe's Escape, detailing France's failed attempt to re-invade Portugal in 1810, including the Battle of Bussaco, and Sharpe's Battle, detailing the Battle of Fuentes de Oñoro.

== Honours ==
- French Empire: Grand Eagle of the Legion of Honour.
- Kingdom of Italy: Grand Dignitary of Order of the Iron Crown.
- Kingdom of Bavaria: Knight of the Order of Saint Hubert.
- Grand Duchy of Baden: Grand Cordon of the Order of Fidelity.
- Kingdom of France: Commander of the Order of Saint Louis.

== Sources ==
- Abbott, John Stevens Cabot (1855). Napoleon at St. Helena (PDF). New York: Harper & brothers.
- Bassett, Richard (2015). For God and Kaiser: The Imperial Austrian Army, 1619-1918. New Haven: Yale University Press. ISBN 9780300178586.
- Béraud, Stéphane (2008). Bonaparte en Italie: naissance d'un stratège, 1796-1797. Paris: Bernard Giovanangeli. ISBN 978-2-7587-0018-0.
- Boycott-Brown, Martin (2001). The Road to Rivoli: Napoleon's First Campaign. London: Cassell & Co. ISBN 0-304-35305-1.
- Cadet, Nicolas (2005). "Anatomie d'une « petite guerre », la campagne de Calabre de 1806-1807". Revue d'histoire du XIXe siècle (30). Société d'histoire de la révolution de 1848 et des révolutions du XIXe siècle. doi:10.4000/rh19.1010.
- Capelle, Béatrice; Demory, Jean-Claude (2008). Maréchaux d'Empire. E/P/A. ISBN 9782851206985.
- Chandler, David G. (1992). Le campagne di Napoleone. Vol. 2. Milan: Rizzoli. ISBN 88-17-11577-0.
- Chandler, David G. (1988). I marescialli di Napoleone. Milan: Rizzoli. ISBN 88-17-33251-8.
- Caresse, Philippe (2023). Jordan, John (ed.). The Battleship Masséna. Oxford: Osprey. ISBN 9781472857132.
- Chardigny, Louis (1977). Les maréchaux de Napoléon. Paris: Tallandier.
- Doher, Marcel (1963). Charles de La Bédoyère, 1786-1815: aide de camp de l'Empereur. J. Peyronnet.
- Dunn-Pattison, R. P. (1909). "André Masséna, marshal, duke of Rivoli, prince of Essling". Napoleon's Marshals. Janus Publishing Company Lim. ISBN 978-1-902835-10-5.
- Elting, John R. (1997). Swords around a Throne: Napoleon's Grande Armée. Phoenix Giant. ISBN 0-7538-0219-8.
- Fiebeger, G. J. (1911). The Campaigns of Napoleon Bonaparte of 1796–1797. West Point, New York: US Military Academy Printing Office.
- Franceschi, Michel (2005). Austerlitz. Montreal: International Napoleonic Society.
- Fremont-Barnes, Gregory, ed. (2006). The Encyclopedia of the French Revolutionary and Napoleonic Wars: A Political, Social, and Military History (PDF). ABC-CLIO. pp. 618–622. ISBN 1-85109-651-5.
- Gachot, Édouard (1904). Histoire militaire de Masséna, La Campagne d'Helvétie (1799). Paris.
- Griffith, Paddy (1998). The Art of War of Revolutionary France, 1789–1802. Greenhill Books. pp. 11, 200. ISBN 1-85367-335-8.
- Hivert-Messeca, Yves (1997). La franc-maçonnerie dans les Alpes-Maritimes: deux siècles de sociabilité urbaine. Les Éditions du Cabri.
- Horward, Donald D. (1973). The French Campaign in Portugal, An Account by Jean Jacques Pelet, 1810–1811. Minneapolis.
- Horward, Donald D. (1997). "André Masséna, Prince D'Essling, in the Age of Revolution (1789–1815)". Journal of the International Napoleonic Society.
- Hulot, Frédéric (2005). Le maréchal Masséna. Paris: Pygmalion. ISBN 2-85704-973-0.
- Hulot, Frédéric (2013). "Le Maréchal Masséna". Les grands maréchaux de Napoléon. Pygmalion. ISBN 978-2-7564-1081-4.
- Humble, Richard (1973). Napoleon's Peninsular Marshals. London: Macdonald. ISBN 0-356-04569-2.
- Jourquin, Jacques (1999). Dictionnaire des maréchaux du Premier Empire: dictionnaire analytique statistique et comparé des vingt-six maréchaux. Paris. ISBN 2-911090-05-5.
- Lefebvre, Georges (2009). Napoleone. Bari: Laterza. ISBN 978-88-420-5902-8.
- Ligou, Daniel (1998). Dictionnaire de la franc-maçonnerie. Presses universitaires de France.
- Masséna, André (1816). Mémoire de M. le Maréchal Masséna, sur les événements qui ont eu lieu en Provence, pendant les mois de mars et d'avril 1815. Paris: Delaunay.
- Marshall-Cornwall, James (1965). Marshal Massena. Oxford University Press.
- Mathiez, Albert; Lefebvre, Georges (1994). La Rivoluzione francese (in Italian). Vol. 2. Turin: Piccola Biblioteca Einaudi. ISBN 88-06-04598-9.
- Montanelli, Indro; Cervi, Mario (1981). Due secoli di guerre. Milan: Editoriale Nuova.
- Oman, Charles (1996). A History of the Peninsular War. Vol. 3. Mechanicsburg: Stackpole Books.
- Paris, Louis (1869). Dictionnaire des anoblissements (in French). Vol. 1. Paris: Bachelin-Deflorenne.
- Petre, F. Loraine (1976). Napoleon and the Archduke Charles. New York, N.Y.: Hippocrene Books. ISBN 0-85368-221-6.
- Phipps, Ramsay Weston (1935). The Armies of the First French Republic and the Rise of the Marshals of Napoleon I. Oxford University Press.
- Pigeard, Alain (1996). Les étoiles de Napoléon: maréchaux, amiraux, généraux 1792-1815. Quatuor.
- Prévot, Chantal (2014). "Enquête sur Eugénie Renique, maîtresse régulière et compagne irrégulière du Maréchal Masséna". Napoleonica. La revue (20): 102. doi:10.3917/napo.142.0102.
- Prévost, Jean-Jacques (2011). "Masséna, maréchal d'Empire, duc de Rivoli, prince d'Essling". La Revue Napoléon. ISSN 1622-4248.
- Révérend, Albert (1905). Titres, anoblissements et pairies de la Restauration, 1814-1830. Vol. 5. Paris.
- Roberts, Andrew (2014). Napoleon: A Life. Penguin. p. 330.
- Roullier, Alain (2010). Masséna, la trahison, les lauriers et les ombres. France Europe Éditions.
- Rothenberg, Gunther E. (1982). Napoleon's Great Adversaries, The Archduke Charles and the Austrian Army, 1792–1814. Bloomington: Indiana University Press. ISBN 0-253-33969-3.
- Rothenberg, Gunther E. (2007). Wagram: l'ultima vittoria di Napoleone. Gorizia: Libreria Editrice Goriziana. ISBN 978-88-6102-011-5.
- Six, Georges (1934). "Masséna, duc de Rivoli, Prince d'Essling (André)". Dictionnaire biographique des généraux et amiraux français de la Révolution et de l'Empire: 1792–1814 (in French). Vol. 2. Paris: Librairie Historique et Nobilaire. pp. 164–166.
- Smith, Digby (1998). The Napoleonic Wars Data Book. London: Greenhill. ISBN 1-85367-276-9.
- Sobel, Brian; Morelock, Jerry D. (2016). "The 100 Greatest Generals of All Time". HistoryNet.
- Sokolov, Oleg (2003). L'Armée de Napoléon. Commios. ISBN 978-2-9518364-1-9.
- Sokolov, Oleg (2006). Austerlitz: Napoléon, l'Europe et la Russie (in French). Commios. ISBN 2-9518364-3-0.
- Valentin, René (1960). Le maréchal Masséna, 1758-1817. Charles Lavauzelle.
- Valynseele, Joseph (1957). Les maréchaux du Premier Empire: Leur famille et leur descendance (in French). FeniXX. ISBN 2402515309.
