= Battle of Peschiera =

- Part of the Italian campaign of 1796–1797 in the War of the First Coalition
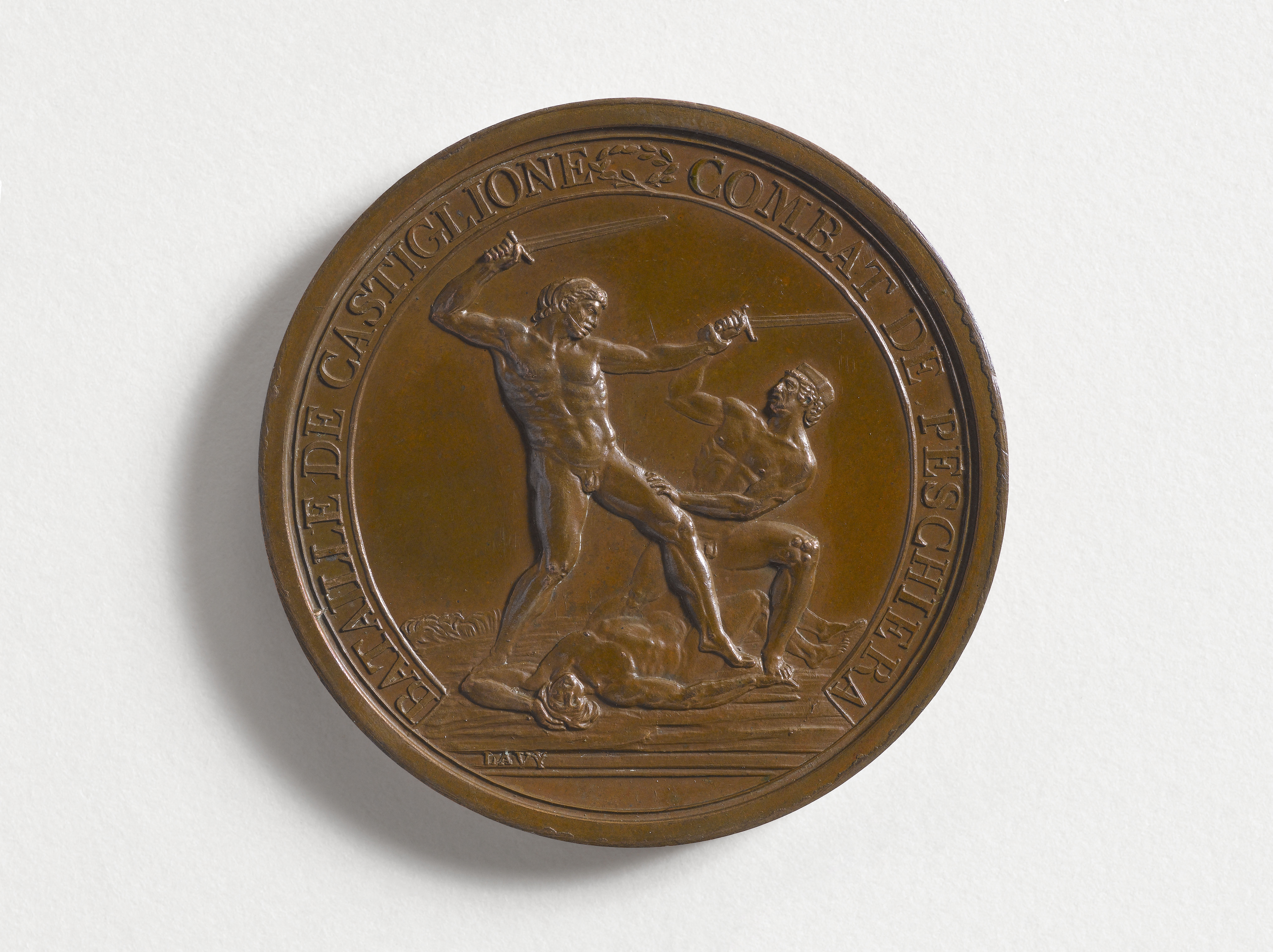
- French commemorative coin of the battles of Casticlione and Peschiera
| Date | 6 August 1796 |
| Location | Peschiera del Garda |
| Result | French victory |

Belligerents
| (French First Republic) French Republic | Habsburg monarchy |

Commanders and leaders
| (French First Republic) André Masséna | (Habsburg monarchy) Anton Lipthay |

Casualties and losses
| 18 killed 131 wounded | 500 men 10 cannons |

The Battle of Peschiera was a minor clash that occurred on 6 August, 1796 between the Austrian troops of General Anton Lipthay and the French division of General André Masséna.

== Historical context ==
After losing possession of the city of Milan to the French, the Austrians, under the command of Beaulieu, retreated beyond the Mincio, to what would later become known as the Quadrilatero. Defeated once again by Napoleon at the time of the crossing, they retreated towards the Trentino valleys, where they could reorganize themselves.

While the French began the first siege of the fortress of Mantua, the new commander of the Austrian forces, Field Marshal Wurmser, prepared an army of 49,000 men and descended again into the Po Valley, attempting to break the siege of Mantua.

== Background ==
After descending from the Alps, Wurmser overwhelmed Massena's division at Rivoli, forcing him to retreat. Having divided his troops to attack both sides of the lake, Wurmser sought to encircle Napoleon. To respond to the threat, the latter was forced to recall all possible men, including those committed to besieging Mantua, and direct them against Qosdanovich's columns in Lonato.

It was at this juncture, on 31 July, that Wurmser ordered to besiege the fortress of Peschiera, currently occupied by General Guillaume and 400 men.

The second decisive clash between the two forces took place in Castiglione: with a skillful maneuver, Napoleon managed, although only partially, to outflank Wurmser's forces, striking them both from the west with the bulk of his army and from the east, with the group entrusted to Fiorella. Unable to resist the force of the assault, the Austrian troops fled, heading again towards the right bank of the Mincio.

== The battle ==
While Wurmser retreated from Castiglione, he had decided to spend the night near Peschiera, hastily setting up an entrenched camp. Those troops were commanded by General Lipthay. The fortress, already under siege for a week, was on the verge of falling.

The French attacked them the following day: Massena's division had in fact arrived on the site. The first to attack they were the men of Victor's brigade.

General Victor, marching at the head of the 18th, attacked the Austrians, finding himself up against fierce and stubborn resistance. Rampon, however, received the order for a second attack from Massena. He harangued the 32nd and rushed at the head of the brigade against the enemy. The Austrian army retreated into the hills and disappeared during the night.

== Aftermath ==
Lipthay's hasty retreat in the direction of Rivoli convinced Wurmser not to remain on the plain and to return to the Trentino valleys.

== Sources ==
- Carl von Clausewitz (1833). The Campaigns of 1796 in Italy (in French). Berlin.
- Carlo G. G. Botta (1824). History of Italy from 1789 to 1814 (in Italian). Paris. ISBN 9-788-82810116-1.
- Fiebeger, G. J. (1911). The Campaigns of Napoleon Bonaparte of 1796–1797. West Point, New York: US Military Academy Printing Office.
