= Prince of Essling =

French noble title

Prince d'Essling
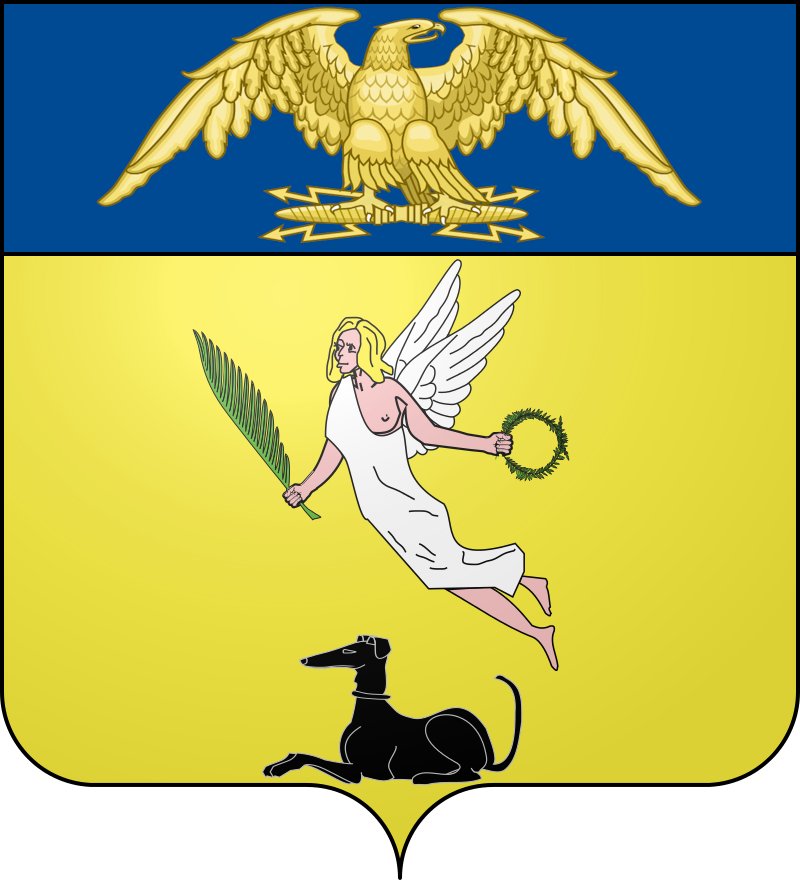
- Coat of arms of the Prince d'Essling
- Creation date: 31 January 1810
- Created by: Napoléon I of France
- Peerage: Nobility of the First French Empire
- First holder: André Masséna
- Present holder: Victor-André Masséna, 7th Prince
- Subsidiary titles: Duke of Rivioli

Prince of Essling (French: Prince d'Essling) is a hereditary title in the Nobility of the First French Empire. It was granted by Emperor Napoleon I to Marshal of the Empire André Masséna in 1809 as a victory title after the Battle of Essling. The creation of the title was finalised by letters patent of 31 January 1810. The year before, Marshal Masséna had already been created Duke of Rivoli (French: Duc de Rivoli) after his victorious Battle of Rivoli.

Both titles are hereditary by primogeniture and have been united since Marshal Masséna received them. As of 2021, Prince d'Essling is the only princely title created by Napoleon still in existence, without having become merged with titles created by other rulers.

== List of titleholders ==
Between 1810 and today, there have been the following titleholders:

- 1810–1817: André Masséna, 1st Prince d'Essling, 1st Duc de Rivoli (16 May 1758 – 4 April 1817)
- 1817–1821: Jacques Prosper Masséna, 2nd Prince d'Essling, 2nd Duc de Rivoli (25 June 1793 – 1821)
- 1821–1863: François Masséna, 3rd Prince d'Essling, 3rd Duc de Rivoli (2 April 1799 – 16 April 1863)
- 1863–1898: André Prosper Victor Masséna, 4th Prince d'Essling, 4th Duc de Rivoli (1829–1898)
- 1898–1910: Victor Masséna, 5th Prince d'Essling, 5th Duc de Rivoli (14 January 1836 – 28 October 1910)
- 1910–1974: André Prosper Victor Eugène Napoléon Masséna, 6th Prince d'Essling, 6th Duc de Rivoli (1891–1974)
- 1974–present: Victor-André Masséna, 7th Prince d'Essling, 7th Duc de Rivoli (29 April 1950 – living)

== Coat of arms ==
The heraldic achievement of the Princes d'Essling, Ducs de Rivoli comprises the following: "Or, the winged Victoria, holding in one hand a palm and in the other an olive crown, the whole Vert, accompanied in a point of a dog lying Sable; all beneath the chief of Princes of the Empire (azure with the golden eagle, the flight extended, head rounded, encroaching a thunderbolt with two lightning bolts, on either side). The shield surrounded by the collar of the Legion of Honour, with its pointed decoration; the whole set in the mantle of Princes of the Empire (azure, lined with ermine, adorned with gold) and crowned with the crown of Princes of the Empire (gold, cap azure, surmounted by a globe, circled, crisscross, gold)."
