= Eugénie Renique =

French ballet dancer

Eugénie Renique (1780–1836), was a French ballet dancer. She had a relationship with General André Masséna for many years, and is known to have accompanied him to battle during the Napoleonic wars, sometimes disguised as a man.
