= Battle of Forano =

Battle of the Third Coalition

- Part of War of the Third Coalition
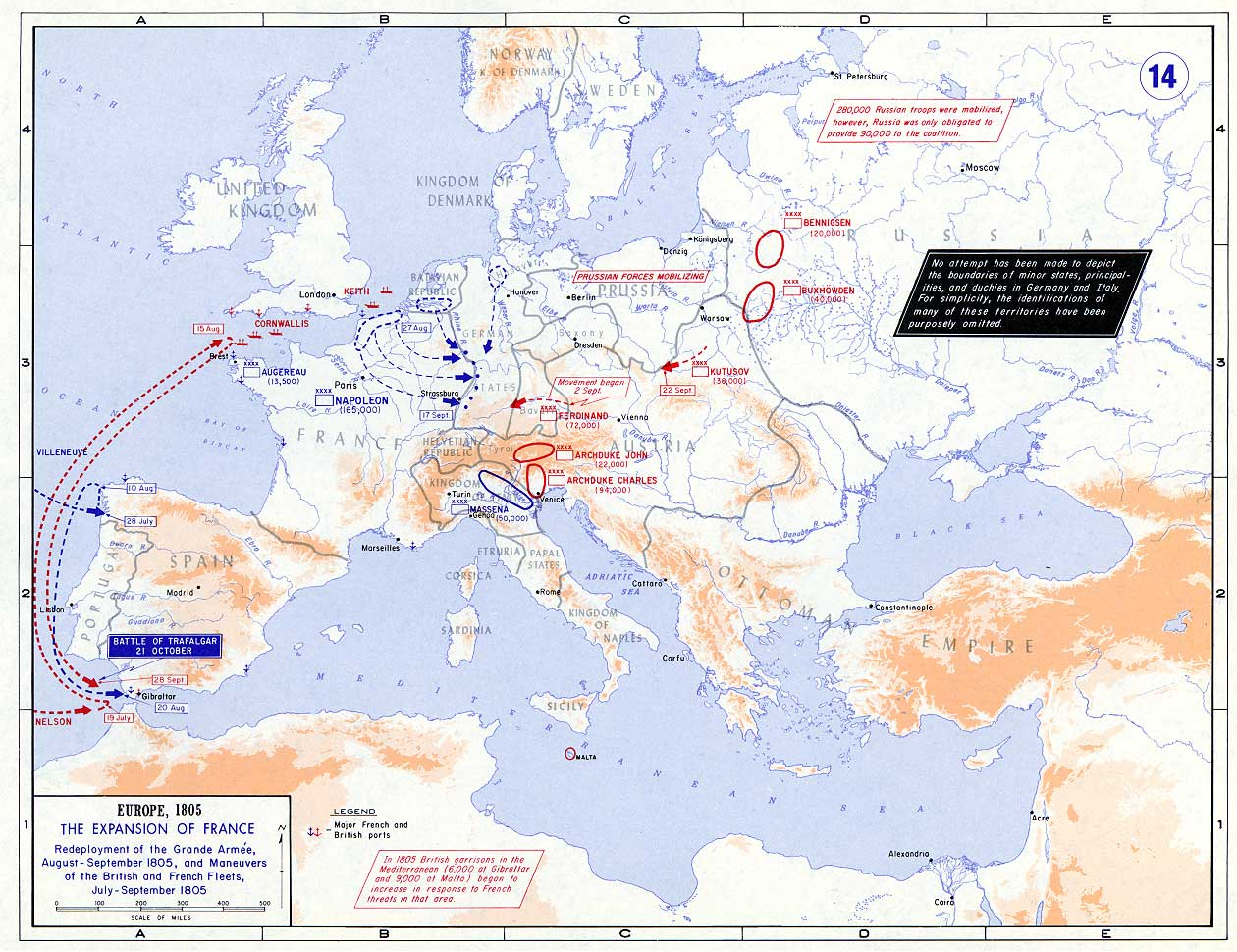
- Strategic Situation of Europe in 1805
Date	2 November 1805
Location	Forano village, 12 miles North of Caldiero, Italy 45°25′26″N 11°11′26″E
Result	French victory

Belligerents
France	Austrian Empire

Commanders and leaders
(France) Marshal André Masséna (France) Gen. Jean-Baptiste Solignac	(Austrian Empire) Maj. Gen. Karl Hillinger

Units involved
Armée d'Italie	Armee von Italien

Strength
6,000 men	4,000 men

Casualties and losses
600 killed or wounded	2,200 killed or wounded
- Location within Italy

The Battle of Forano took place during the War of the Third Coalition on 2 November 1805 which saw a decisive French victory by the Armée d'Italie under the command of Marshal André Masséna and General Jean-Baptiste Solignac over the Austrian troops led by Major general Karl Hillinger.

== Pre-Battle Situation ==
Following the Austrian defeat at the Battle of Caldiero on 30 October 1805, the French Armée d'Italie were in pursuit of the Austrian Army. Before a small Austrian force under the command of Major general Karl Hillinger decided to strike back at the French Army.

== The Battle ==
A detachment of the Austrian Army under the command of Major general Karl Hillinger, tried to attack the left flank of the pursuing French Army near the village of Forano 12 miles North of Caldiero in order to break their momentum and possibly spilt their forces so it would be easier for the fleeing Austrians to reorganize and possibly launch a counterattack against the split French forces. However, General Hillinger advanced too fast towards the French flank which caused him to break away too far from the main Austrian force and left his small force vulnerable to the French attacks. The French Army under the command of General Jean-Baptiste Solignac quickly engaged in combat with the Austrian force, who soon became disorganized as there was little coordination between the Austrian units. This let to the complete collapse of the Austrian chain of command and the better organized French subsequently were able to inflict a great deal of casualties to the Austrian force, which let to the retreat of the Austrians after having lost more than half their men.

== Aftermath ==
The battle resulted in a clear French victory with 600 French soldiers killed or wounded, in comparison to the Austrians 2,200 casualties. This battle let to the Caldiero pursuit where the French Army chased the Austrian Army out of Italy, which set the ground for the French conquest of Italy.
