= Château de Rueil =

Building in Île-de-France, France

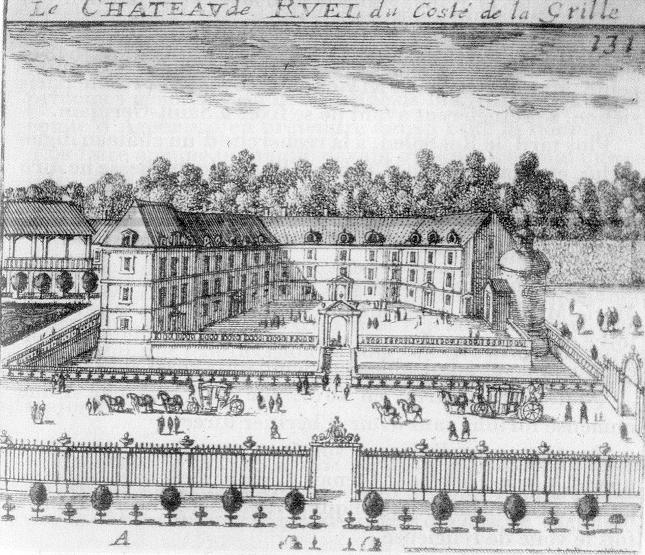
- View of the entrance facade

- Location within France

General information
- Architectural style: French Renaissance and Baroque
- Location: Rueil-Malmaison (Hauts-de-Seine), France
- Coordinates: 48.86997°N 2.18476°E
- Construction started: 1560s
- Demolished: 1830s

The Château de Rueil (formerly spelled Ruel, also referred to as the Château du Val de Ruel) was a 17th-century French château located in Rueil-Malmaison. It was especially famous for its gardens, created before those of Vaux-le-Vicomte and Versailles, and was the preferred residence of Cardinal Richelieu from at least 1633 (when he purchased it) until his death in 1642.

== History ==
The origins of the château are obscure, but it was probably initially constructed in the 1560s and purchased in 1606 by a courtier of Henri IV of France, Jean de Moisset, who added to the château and acquired additional land for the expansion of the gardens. The property was bought in 1633 by Cardinal Richelieu, who had the architect Jacques Lemercier remodel and enlarge the château, as well as the gardens and grounds. The château and grounds were renovated again in 1750 by Philippe Dullin de La Ponneraye. During the reign of Louis-Philippe, the buildings were demolished, and the estate was subdivided. Remnants include three basins (one four-lobed), a house (now known as the Maison du Père Joseph), and a stone bench, all formerly part of the gardens.

== Gardens ==
Engravings by Gabriel Pérelle after Israël Silvestre

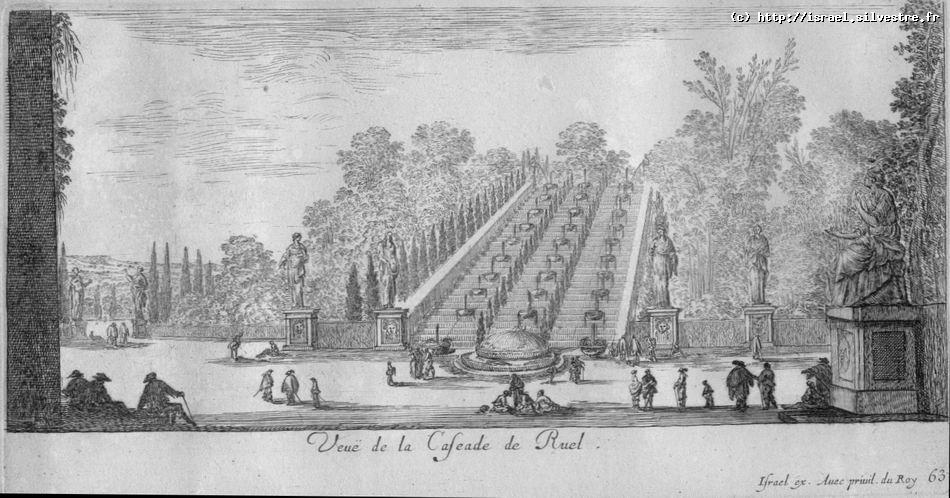
The grand cascade in the gardens.

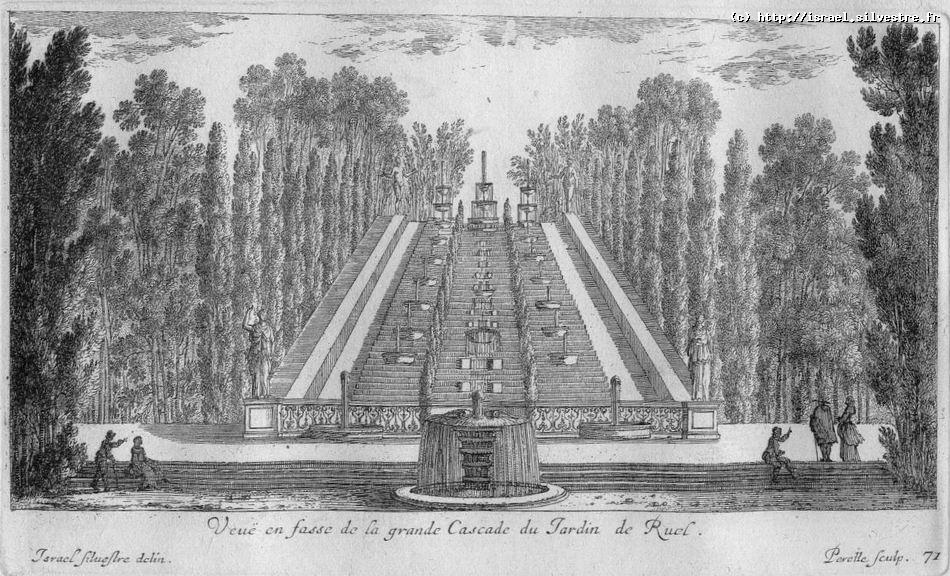
View of the grand cascade

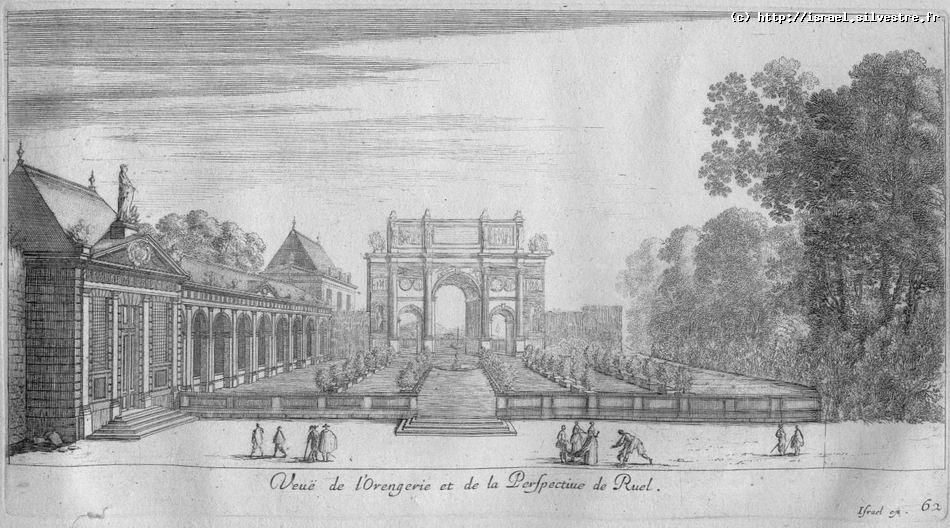
View of the orangerie

== Bibliography ==
- Ballon, Hilary; Helot-Lécroart, Dominique (1985)."Le Château et les jardins de Rueil du temps de Jean de Moisset et du Cardinal de Richelieu," Paris et Ile-de-France, Mémoires, vol. 36, pp. 19–94. ISSN 0428-1551. Article pdf available for purchase at the website of the Cths.
- Ballon, Hilary (2002). "The Architecture of Cardinal Richelieu", pp. 246–259, in Richelieu: Art and Power, exhibition catalog, edited by Hilliard Todd Goldfarb. Ghent: Snoeck. ISBN 9789053494073.
- Gady, Alexandre (2005). Jacques Lemercier : Architecte et ingénieur du Roi. Paris: Éditions de la Maison des sciences de l'homme. ISBN 9782735110421.
- Kay, Thornton (4 February 2014). "Cardinal Richelieu's stone garden bench on SalvoWEB", retrieved 10 March 2016.
