= Louis Chardigny =

French historian (1909–1990)

Louis Chardigny (1909–1990) was a French historian. He authored several books about Napoleon. He won three prizes from the Académie française: the Prix d’Académie for Maréchaux de France in 1942; the Prix Thérouanne for Les maréchaux de Napoléon in 1948; and the Prix Eugène Colas for L’homme Napoléon in 1948.
