= Mounted Chasseurs of the Young Guard =

French light cavalry unit, 1813–1815

Chasseurs on Horse of the Young Guard
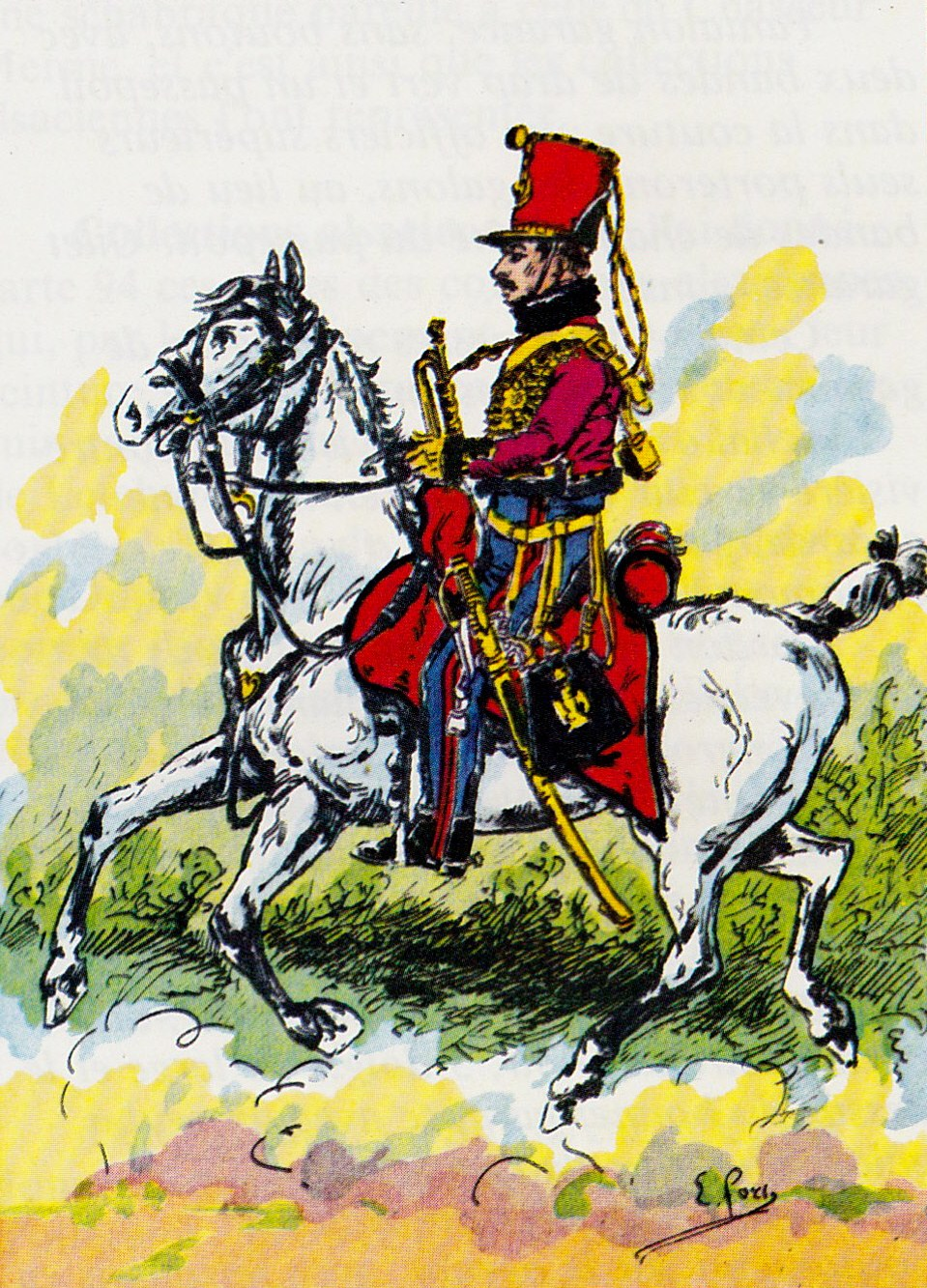
- Trumpet of the 2nd Regiment of Imperial Guard Horse Chasseurs, 1815. Illustration by Ernest Fort.
- Active: 1813–1815
- Country: France
- Allegiance: First French Empire
- Branch: Grande Armée
- Type: Regiment
- Role: Light cavalry
- Garrison/HQ: Chantilly, Oise
- Engagements: Napoleonic Wars

The Mounted Chasseurs of the Young Guard, (officially created in 1815 as the 2nd Regiment of Mounted Chasseurs of the Imperial Guard and nicknamed the Hussars-Eclaireurs), were a light cavalry unit of the Imperial Guard, formed by Napoleon I and serving in the French army from 1813 to 1814, as well as during the Hundred Days.

The decree of March 6, 1813 gave the 6th, 7th, 8th and 9th squadrons of the Garde's mounted chasseurs the name of "second chasseurs". On March 17, these squadrons were officially renamed the Mounted Chasseurs of the Young Guard. They took part in the German campaign of 1813 with the Old Guard, before being detached in 1814 to the Armée du Nord commanded by general Nicolas-Joseph Maison. The squadrons were disbanded during the First Restoration, most of the men being returned to the line cavalry.

During the Hundred Days, the Young Guard squadrons were recruited to form the 2nd Regiment of Imperial Guard Horse Chasseurs. The unit remained in Chantilly, due to a lack of men and especially horses, and did not take part in the Battle of Waterloo. The Young Guard horse chasseurs were definitively disbanded on October 26, 1815, following Napoleon's abdication and the return of the Bourbons.

== Organization ==
=== 1813–1814 ===
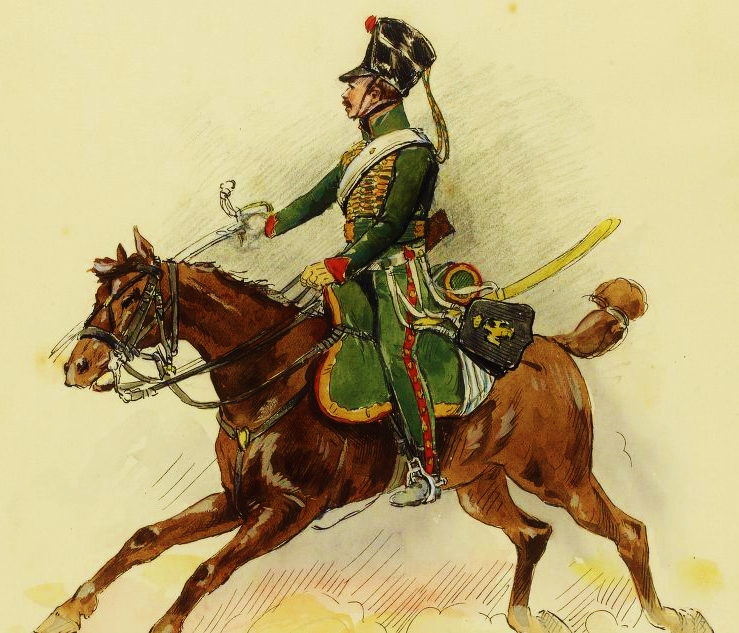
Mounted Chasseurs of the Young Guard (1813), with cylindrical shako. Illustration by Ernest Fort, based on the archives of the French Ministry of War.

Under the decree of March 6, 1813, the Imperial Guard mounted chasseur regiment was increased from five to nine squadrons of 250 men each, with only the 1st, 2nd, 3rd, 4th and 5th retaining the name Old Guard. The 6th, 7th, 8th and 9th squadrons, known as "second chasseurs", were recruited from conscripts and cavalrymen supplied by the French departments. The salary was the same as for line cavalry, but with the supplement granted to troops from the Paris garrison.

The status of these four squadrons was regularized by a decree of March 17, which created the cavalry of the Young Guard, and stated that "the new squadrons created in the cavalry regiments of our Guard by the decrees of January 18 and 23, and March 6 are of the Young Guard". They then took on the official title of Chasseurs on Horse of the Young Guard. When the Scouts of the Imperial Guard were created in December 1813, they irregularly adopted the moniker "Hussards-Eclaireurs de la Jeune Garde", as none of these new units had been attached to the Guard's mounted chasseurs. The corps is commanded by Colonel Major Charles-Claude Meuziau.

During the First Restoration, under the May 12, 1814 ordinance reorganizing the French army corps, most of the Jeune Garde horse chasseurs were transferred to the cavalry of the line., in the 2nd, 3rd and 7th horse chasseurs

=== 1815 ===
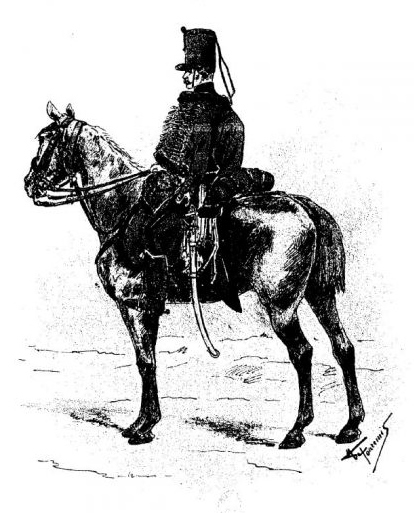
Chasseurs on Horse of the Young Guard, 1815. The breeches are Hungarian-style, but according to Bernardin, gray canvas pants were substituted during the Hundred Days. Illustration by Marcel de Fonrémis.

During the Hundred Days, Napoleon re-established the Imperial Guard and ordered the formation of a Young Guard cavalry regiment. The regiment was officially created by decree on May 15, 1815, with a theoretical strength of 49 officers and 1,008 soldiers. The regiment was recruited from the four previously disbanded horse chasseur squadrons of the Young Guard, from cavalrymen of the line with four years' service, and from the four cavalry regiments of the Guard, in particular from the chasseurs, who provided 438 cavalrymen.

The Emperor nonetheless decided to dither over the unit's name, hesitating between the terms "lancers" and "hussars". On May 26, he finally decided in favor of " horse chasseurs ". The regiment was attached to the Old Guard mounted chasseurs, and its organization was overseen by their board of directors. On May 27, the unit officially took the name "2e régiment de Chasseurs on Horse of the Young Guard", and added to this name its former nickname of "hussards-éclaireurs de la Jeune Garde". Henry Lachouque states that the creation of the 2nd Chasseurs was motivated by "the memory of the Éclaireurs regiment attached to the Chasseurs, whose conduct in 1814 had been extremely brilliant".

The regiment was definitively dissolved between October 8 and November 8, 1815, after the fall of Napoleon and the return of the Bourbons. The regimental command staff and 1st squadron were dismissed at La Châtre on October 16; the 2nd squadron at Moulins on October 8, and its horses handed over to the 4th Hussar Regiment; the 3rd squadron at Bourges on November 8; and finally the 4th squadron at Clermont-Ferrand on October 19, the latter having forced the sub-prefect of Montluçon to pay two months' back pay en route. On December 4, 1815, the closing minutes for the dismissal of the regiment were drawn up in Bourges.

== Military campaigns ==
In 1813, during the German campaign, squadrons of the Old Guard and Young Guard horse chasseurs fought side by side. In December 1813, General Lefebvre-Desnouettes was sent to the Netherlands with the Young Guard mounted chasseurs, to recapture the town of Bréda from the Allies and cover Antwerp. However, the disproportionate size of his forces forced him to withdraw to Antwerp on December 23. From then on, the 15th company of the 6th squadron, the 7th, 8th and 9th squadrons and the company of mamelukes of the Young Guard remained in Belgium, within the army of general Nicolas-Joseph Maison. They spent the entire French campaign there, under the command of colonel Charles-Claude Meuziau. On January 1, 1814, the Young Guard squadrons had 54 officers, 1,140 cavalry and 1,251 horses.

As part of the Antwerp army, Meuziau's chasseurs mainly carried out reconnaissance missions. On January 2, 1814, second lieutenant Desfossés, leading 48 men, charged a troop of 500 opposing cavalrymen and dispersed them. Only one brigadier was wounded, and 24 of the regiment's soldiers, taken prisoner the day before, were freed. On March 31, the Young Guard squadrons charged again at the battle of Courtrai, losing five killed and two officers wounded. By April 16, only 30 officers, 660 cavalrymen and 679 horses remained in the ranks; around 100 men were hospitalized and 34 others were taken prisoner.

At the start of the Belgian campaign of 1815, the 2nd mounted chasseur regiment was barely organized. It lacked 451 officers, non-commissioned officers and chasseurs, as well as 935 horses out of 968. In fact, the unit never left the vicinity of Chantilly, where its garrison was located.

== Commanders ==
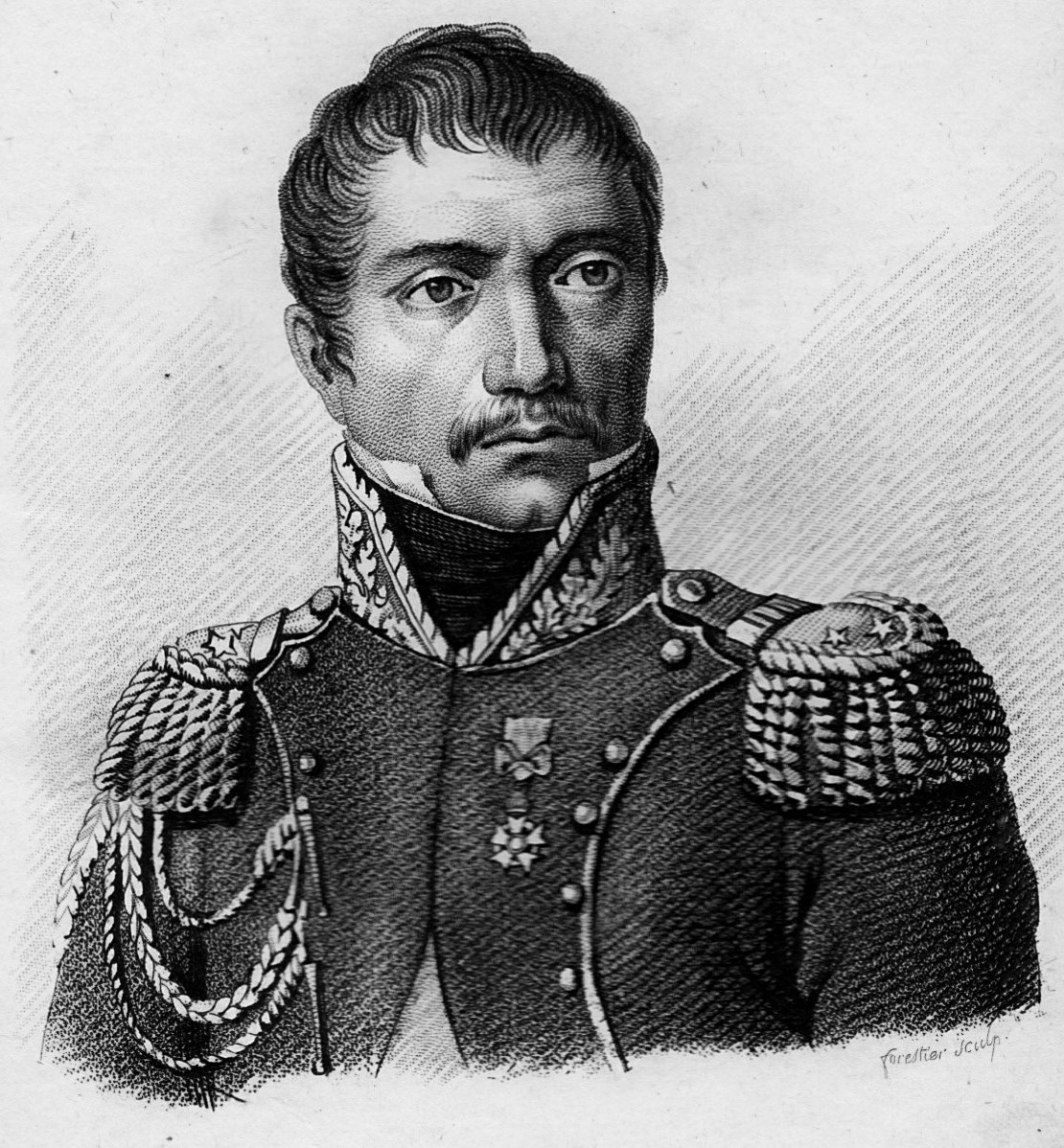
General Eugène Merlin, commanding the 2nd Regiment of Garde horse chasseurs during the Hundred Days. Engraving of 1818.

The regiment's first commander was General Charles-Claude Meuziau, who took over as major-colonel. Meuziau served in the German campaign in 1813, then in 1814 in the Armée du Nord commanded by General Maison, who was then operating in Belgium. He fought with his unit until the end of the French campaign.

In 1815, during the Hundred Days, General Eugène Antoine François Merlin was appointed commanding officer of the newly-formed 2nd Regiment of Horse Chasseurs, with the rank of major-colonel. He was assisted by squadron commanders Assant, Jacobi, Chazanges and Cardon, adjutants-majors Prégu and Beller, paymaster Duclos, surgeon-major Garnier and major Thomassini.

== Uniforms ==
In 1813 and 1814, the uniform of the Chasseurs on Horse of the Young Guard was similar to that worn by Old Guard squadrons, with the main difference being the shako worn by the former.

Re-created in 1815 during the Hundred Days, the 2nd Regiment of Chasseurs on Horse of the Young Guard saw its proposed uniform, proposed by General Lefebvre-Desnouettes, adopted by the Emperor on May 26, 1815. The following day, Lefebvre-Desnouettes drew up the order prescribing the dress to be given to officers and troops.

=== Troupe ===
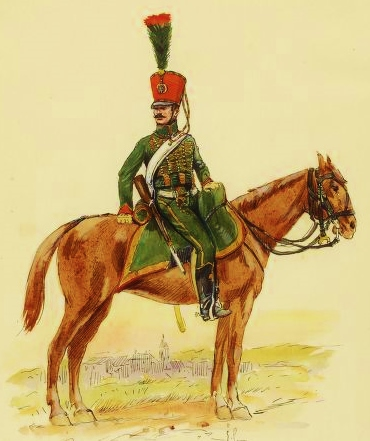
Chasseurs on Horse of the Young Guard (1813–1814). Illustration by Ernest Fort, based on the archives of the French Ministry of War.

==== 1813–1814 ====
The regiment distinguished itself by wearing the shako, of which 1,703 were issued in 1813. This headdress is topped by a plume or pompom, but its shape is open to debate. The first is the truncated cone-shaped shako, depicted in a portrait of Lieutenant de Girardin of the 2nd Chasseurs, and similar to that of the Guards of Honor. The second is the cylindrical shako, the existence of which seems to be confirmed by the list of store effects and the minutes of the unit's dismissal. Commandant Bucquoy notes that both possibilities are equally valid, pointing out that the truncated cone-shaped shako may have been worn in 1813 during the German campaign, and that the cylindrical shako, "modelled on those received by the second regiment of Éclaireurs at the same time", may have been issued when the chasseurs à cheval left for Belgium in early 1814.

The rest of the outfit includes a green dolman and a plain vest in the same color. The green pants are Hungarian-style for the large outfit, with bows and an orange stripe. On the campaign trail, the Hungarian knots disappear.

==== 1815 ====
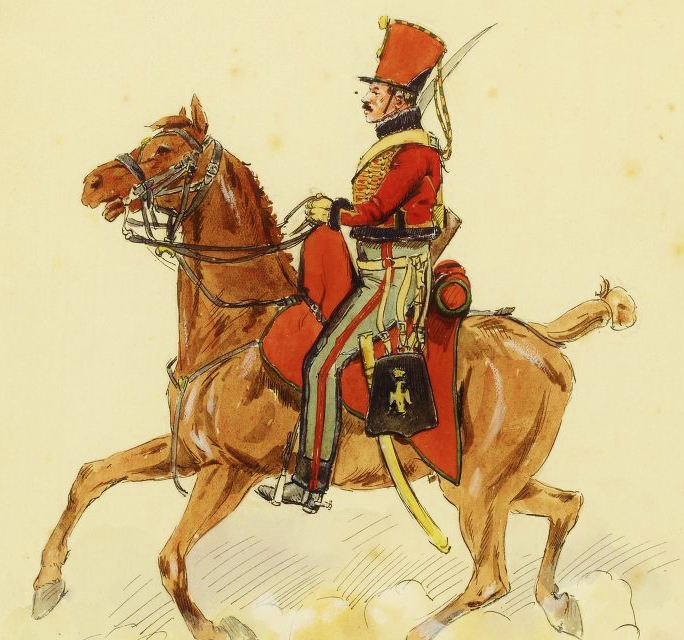
Chasseurs on Horse of the Young Guard (1815). Illustration by Ernest Fort, based on the archives of the French Ministry of War.

According to the order of May 27, 1815, the shako is "madder red with double visor, green and madder cord". Commandant Bucquoy specifies that it is a cylindrical shako, with cordons and snowshoes, but adds that the location and even existence of the latter for the troop uniform is not certain. The shako of the Jeune Garde horse hunters, based on a drawing by General Vanson, is carmine red, with green and yellow braid and an oval pompom in the same colors. However, Bucquoy asks: "Is this the troop's schako, a non-commissioned officer's schako, or a trumpeter's schako? We don't know. In addition to the shako, cavalrymen also wore a green police cap, with red and yellow stripes and yellow piping.

In theory, the pelisse is madder with yellow braids and trimmed with black fur. In fact, it was the pelisses originally intended for the Old Guard mounted chasseurs that were eventually sent to Chantilly to dress the 2nd regiment. The dolman is in green cloth, as is the collar, with yellow braids and madder-colored facings. However, collector Léonce Bernardin, in an article published in the 1925 Carnet de la Sabretache, asserts that only the trumpeter-major's sky-blue dolman was made. He adds that none of the green or madder sashes were issued to the regiment. The 18-button stable jackets are green with madder facings and decorated with yellow wool braids. The coat, with sleeves, is also green. The Hungarian-style pants, for the large outfit, are madder with yellow braids and bows, and the "horse" pants are green with a double madder stripe. Bernardin points out that the Hungarian breeches were not made, and that the horse pants, instead of being green, were made of gray cloth. The boots are hussar-style, and fitted with iron spurs.

=== Trumpets ===
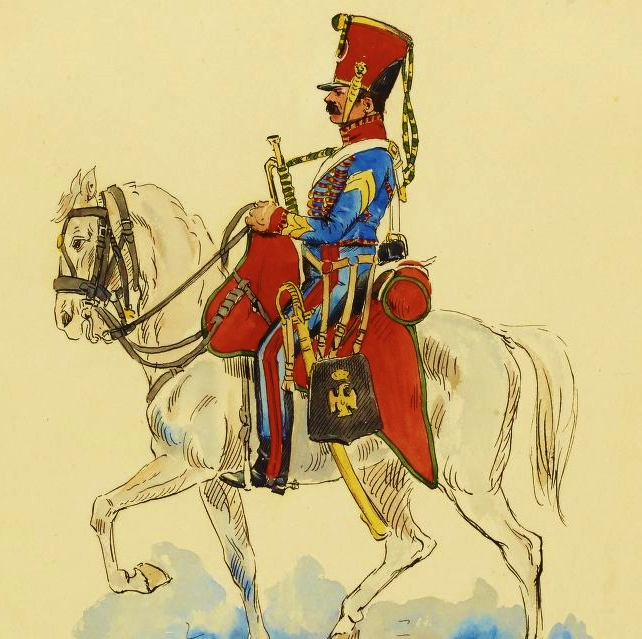
Major trumpet of the Chasseurs on Horse of the Young Guard (1815). Illustration by Ernest Fort, based on the archives of the French Ministry of War.

Léonce Bernardin wrote of the regiment's trumpeters in 1815 that they "wore crimson pelisse, sky-blue pants and side caps". This uniform, reproduced by Ernest Fort, details a garance shako with green and yellow pompom and cord, a crimson pelisse with yellow braids and braids edged with black fur, and sky-blue pants with a double garance stripe. The trumpeter in full regalia from the Alsatian collections wears a madder shako topped with a white pompom, as well as a sky-blue dolman with green collar and white braids. The pelisse is identical to the dolman, the belt is green and madder and the pants madder with orange Hungarian knots. However, Commandant Bucquoy notes that he has "little confidence in his accuracy. The green collar of the dolman and the blue pelisse seem impossible to me".

The major-trumpeter´s uniform in 1815 is shown in an illustration by Ernest Fort, from the archives of the French Ministry of War. The shako and pants are the same as those worn by trumpeters, and the collet is madder with yellow and madder braid. His dolman, the only one made in 1815 as noted by Léonce Bernardin, is in sky-blue cloth with scarlet distinctions.

=== Officers and non-commissioned officers ===
==== 1813–1814 ====
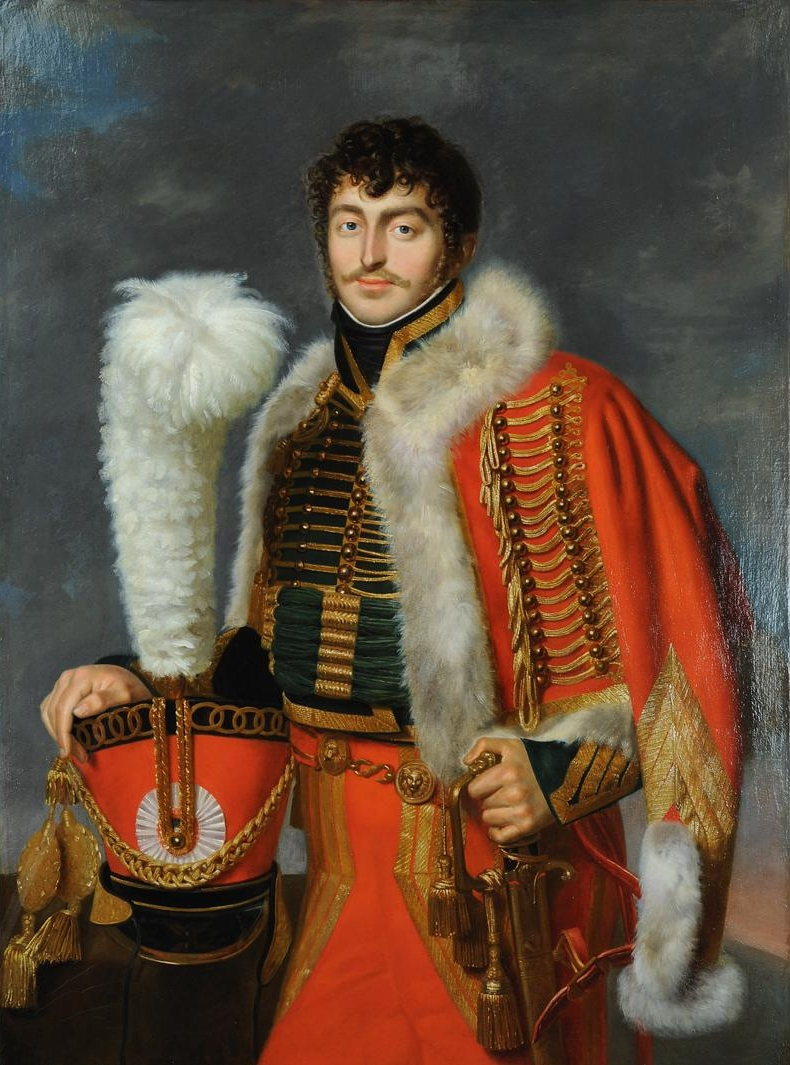
Portrait of Jacques de Trobriant, chef d'escadron des chasseurs à cheval de la Jeune Garde. Anonymous oil on canvas, 19th century.

During this period, the officers and non-commissioned officers of the Young Guard mounted chasseurs, who retained the rank of Old Guard, wore their uniforms. This is confirmed by Captain Parquin in his Souvenirs, as well as by a portrait of Lieutenant de Girardin and a plate from the collection known as "du bourgeois de Magdebourg", illustrating a brigadier.

==== 1815 ====
The order of May 27, 1815 prescribes a madder pelisse for officers, with gold braids and braids and trimmed with black astrakhan fur. The dolman is made of green cloth with madder facings and gold braiding, and the pants are madder-colored with a double green stripe and no buttons. The belt is described as being made of "mixed madder and green braids; gold olives", but Commandant Bucquoy notes that he has never seen any depiction of it. The shako resembles that of the troop, except for the gold pompom and cord. The Hungarian-style pants are madder, with gold braids and stripes.

The little outfits include two costumes. The first, known as the "merry-go-round jacket", features a typically Polish cut, with a garance confederatka (flat fur cap topped with a chapska pavilion) with yellow braid, and a green jacket with basques, garance piping, turn-up and facing tabs. The pants are madder with double green stripes. The second, closer to the usual uniform of Young Guard chasseurs, features the usual garance shako with gold pompom, complemented by a full-length, knee-length green coat with garance collar and facings. The pants are identical to the first outfit.

== Equipment and harness ==
From 1813 to 1814, buffleteries gear was white for the troops, with a black leather cartridge box and sabretache for field dress. In full dress, the sabretache is made of green cloth with aurora braiding, with a crowned eagle coat of arms in the center. The minutes of the unit's dismissal indicate the presence of a red cloth chabraque for the troop, but Commandant Bucquoy notes that "we don't know whether it was actually edged with aurora braid [...] or the green braid worn by the [...] Merme chasseur".

In 1815, the troop's uniform buffs were yellow, and the sabretache was made of black leather. "Should this prevent the eagle plate?" asks Commandant Bucquoy, who says he doesn't know the answer to this question. The leather saddle is of the same design as that of the lancers of the Line. It is covered with a green piped madder chabraque, with a black sheepskin on the seat. Bucquoy notes, however, that a chabraque with only one piping is impossible, and concludes that there is either an omitted aurora braid, or a slip of the tongue with the word "galon" instead of "passepoil".

For officers, the cartridge box is made of patent leather with gold decorations, and the sabretache is made of unadorned boiled leather. The chabraque is identical to that of the troops, but senior officers also have a panther-skin chabraque, specific to Old Guard officers.

== Standards ==
On June 1, 1815, Napoleon awarded the 2nd Regiment of Chasseurs on Horse of the Young Guard an eagle. This eagle, of the same design as those of the other regiments of the Garde cavalry, remained with the regiment at Chantilly and did not take part in the Belgian campaign. The defeat at Waterloo and Napoleon's abdication led to the disbandment of the corps, and the eagle, deposited at Bourges on August 27, was destroyed there on October 22.

== Bibliography ==
- Bucquoy, Eugène-Louis (1977). La Garde impériale : troupes à cheval. Les Uniformes du Premier Empire. Paris: Jacques Grancher.
- Descaves, Paul (1891). Historique du 13e régiment de chasseurs et des chasseurs à cheval de la Garde,. Béziers: A. Bouineau & Cie. OCLC 763356561.

== See also ==
- Imperial Guard (Napoleon I)
