= Antoine François Eugène Merlin =

French politician and officer (1778–1854)

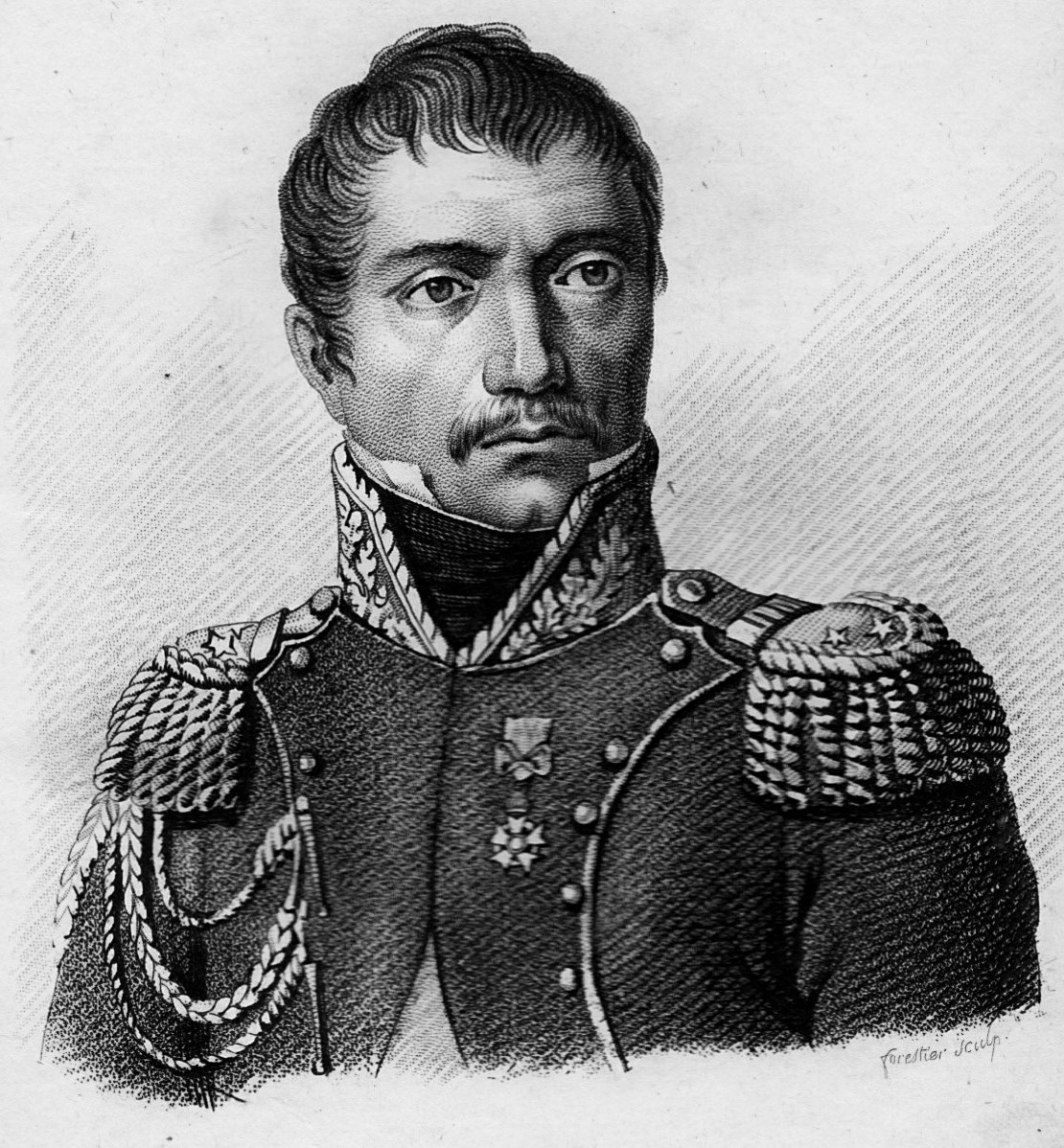
- Born: 27 December 1778; Douai
- Died: 31 August 1854 (aged 75); Eaubonne
- Military career
- Allegiance: France
- Branch: Cavalry
- Service years: 1793–1848
- Conflicts: French Revolutionary Wars; Napoleonic Wars
- Awards: Grand Officer of the Legion of Honour; Knight of the Order of Saint Louis
- Other work: Member of the Chamber of Deputies; Peer of France

Antoine François Eugène Merlin (French pronunciation: [ɑ̃twan fʁɑ̃swa øʒɛn mɛʁlɛ̃]; 27 December 1778 – 31 August 1854) was a French soldier and general of the French Revolutionary and Napoleonic Wars, who fought in central Europe, the Peninsular War and at Waterloo. Later in life, he became a politician and sat in the Chamber of Deputies as a supporter of the July Monarchy.

== Early life and career ==
Antoine François Eugène Merlin was born in Douai on 27 December 1778, the son of lawyer and politician Philippe-Antoine Merlin de Douai and Jeanne Brigitte Dumouceaux. He first entered military service in 1793 aged 14, attached to the staff of General Cambray during the war in the Vendée. On 30 October 1795, he joined the 7th Chasseurs a Cheval as a Second Lieutenant, became aide-de-camp to General Songis on 10 December 1795, and spent the next two years serving in the Army of the North.

In 1798, Merlin took part in the French invasion of Egypt, acting as an aide-de-camp to General Bonaparte. He fought at the battle of the Pyramids, the capture of Katieh (where he was provisionally promoted to Lieutenant), the sieges of Jaffa and Acre, and the battle of Abukir. He returned to France with his commander in 1799.

His promotion confirmed by the Directory on 19 October 1799, Merlin was further promoted to captain in the 1st Chasseurs à Cheval on 26 March 1800. Serving first in the Army of the Reserve and then the Army of Italy, he became aide-de-camp to General Dupont and fought at Marengo. He was promoted to Chef d'escadron on 20 January 1801, transferred to the 14th Cavalry on 19 November, and then to the 4th Hussars on 3 August 1803. He served in Hanover from 1803 to 1805.

Merlin was made a Knight of the Legion of Honour on 14 June 1804.

== First empire ==
In 1805, Merlin's regiment was recalled to the Grande Armée and he served in it for the next three years, fighting at the battles of Austerlitz, Jena and Friedland. He distinguished himself at the capture of Lübeck, and promoted to Major on 20 February 1807. On 20 July 1808 he became a chevalier de l'Empire, and served the following year under Marshal Bernadotte in Antwerp.

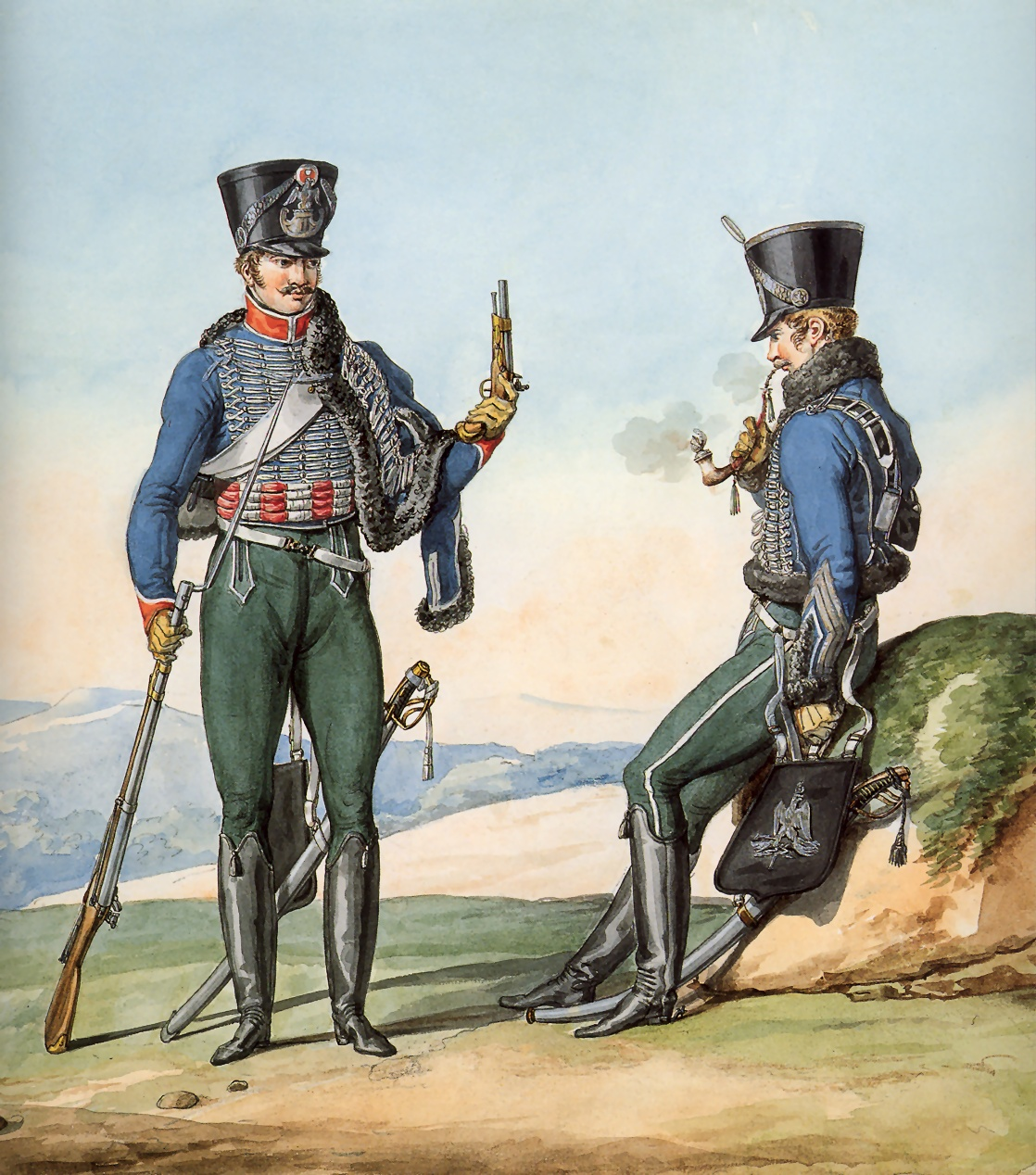
Troopers of the 1st Hussars

On 1 September 1810, Merlin was appointed Colonel of the 1st Hussars, who had been fighting in the Peninsular War since 1808. Joining his regiment in Spain, he distinguished himself at Sabugal, where he dispersed a British regiment and recaptured an artillery piece they had just captured. For this feat, he was made an officer of the Legion of Honour.

The following year, Merlin fought at the Battle of Salamanca, where he protected the French army's retreat. In October 1812, his regiment was transferred to General Curto's brigade of the Army of Portugal. On 14 July 1813 he was promoted to Général de Brigade and recalled to the Grande Armee in Saxony.

During the German Campaign of 1813, Merlin led the 2nd Brigade of Lorge's 5th Light Cavalry division within Arrighi's III Cavalry Corps. He fought at Leipzig and Hanau, and was publicly praised by Napoleon who made him second-in-command of the 4th Guards of Honour. Transferred to IV Corps in December 1813, he spent the remainder of the war engaged in the defence of Mainz.

Following Napoleon's abdication, Merlin was made inactive, but he was made a Knight of the Order of Saint Louis by Louis XVIII.

Merlin rallied to Napoleon during the Hundred Days and seized the fort of Vincennes on 20 March 1815. He then organized, and became major of the new 2nd regiment of Chasseurs à Cheval of the Imperial Guard. On 13 June 1815, he was given command of the 2nd brigade in Subervie's 5th Cavalry Division of the Army of the North. During the Waterloo campaign, this formation fought on the French left at Ligny and in the defence of Plancenoit at the battle of Waterloo.

== Post war career ==
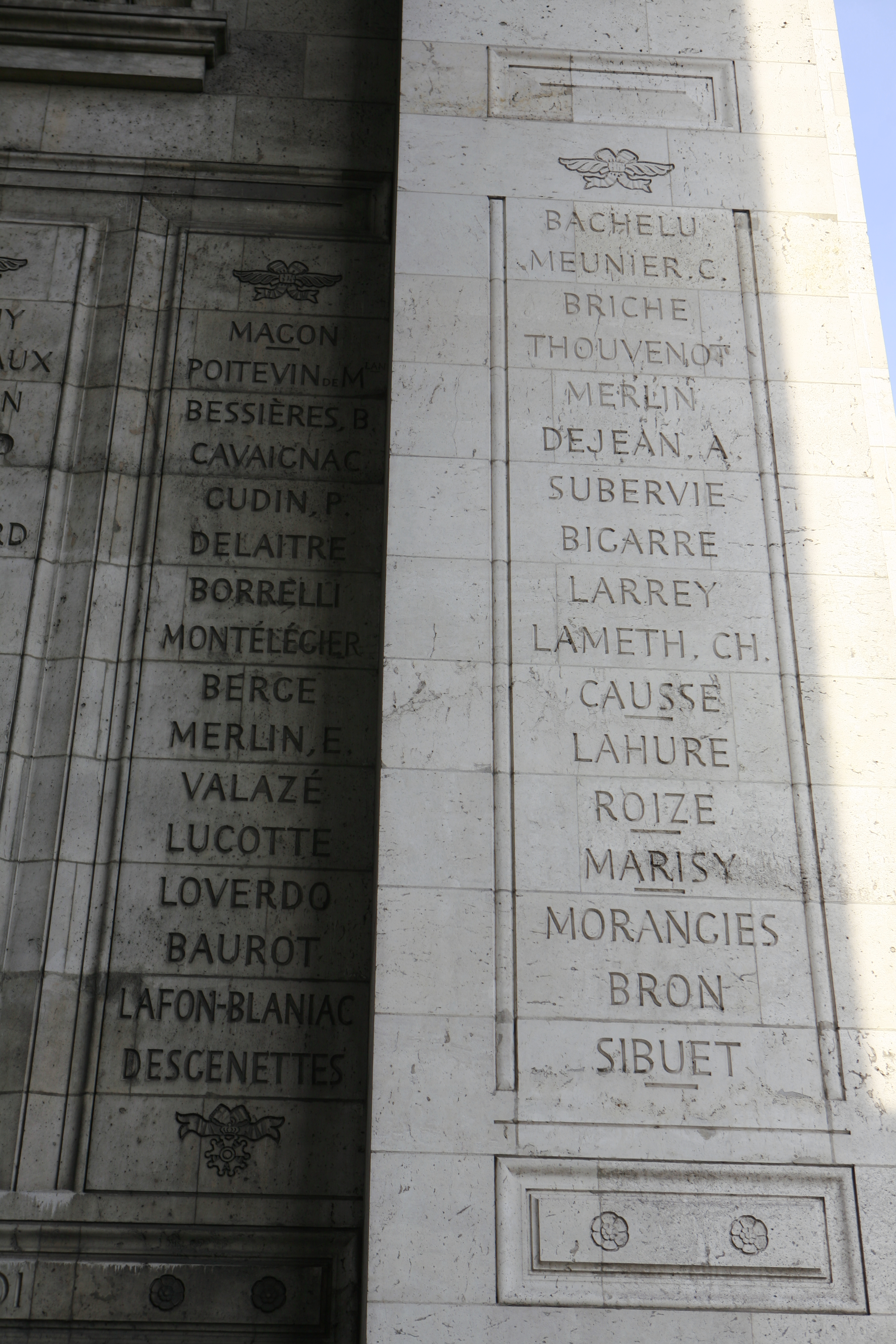
Merlin's name – MERLIN, E – as it appears on the Arc de Triomphe

After the Second Restoration, Merlin went into exile with his father, who was one of 38 men outlawed by the new regime. The two men boarded the American vessel Alice in Antwerp and set sail for the United States, but were shipwrecked near Vlissingen in the mouth of the Scheldt on 24 February 1816.

Merlin was able to return to France in 1818, but was accused of complicity in the conspiracy of Béfort in August 1820. Acquitted by the Chamber of Peers in February 1821, he was able to live quietly in retirement until the July Revolution.

Returning to duty under the new regime in 1830, Merlin was made a Commander of the Legion of Honour on 21 March 1831 and added to the general staff. Leading a brigade in the reserve cavalry division of the Army of the North during the Ten Days' Campaign, he was present at the Siege of Antwerp. He was promoted to lieutenant general on 30 September 1832 and held a succession of military posts culminating with the command of the 18th division on 7 June 1834.

Elected to represent Avesnes in the election of 1834, Merlin sat among the conservatives in the Chamber of Deputies, and was a partisan of the new dynasty. He became a Grand Officer of the Legion of Honor on 30 January 1837, a Count (on the death of his father) on 21 December 1838, and a Peer of France on 7 November 1839. He retired from the military on 30 May 1848.

General Merlin died in Eaubonne on 31 August 1854 (aged 75), and was buried in the cemetery there. His name is inscribed on the south side of the Arc de Triomphe.

== Family ==
Merlin married Louise Gohier (1788–1853), the only child of Louis-Jérôme Gohier and a descendant of Pierre Du Moulin, on 7 August 1806. The couple had no children.
