= Marie-Louise (conscript) =

Teenagers conscripted by France in 1813

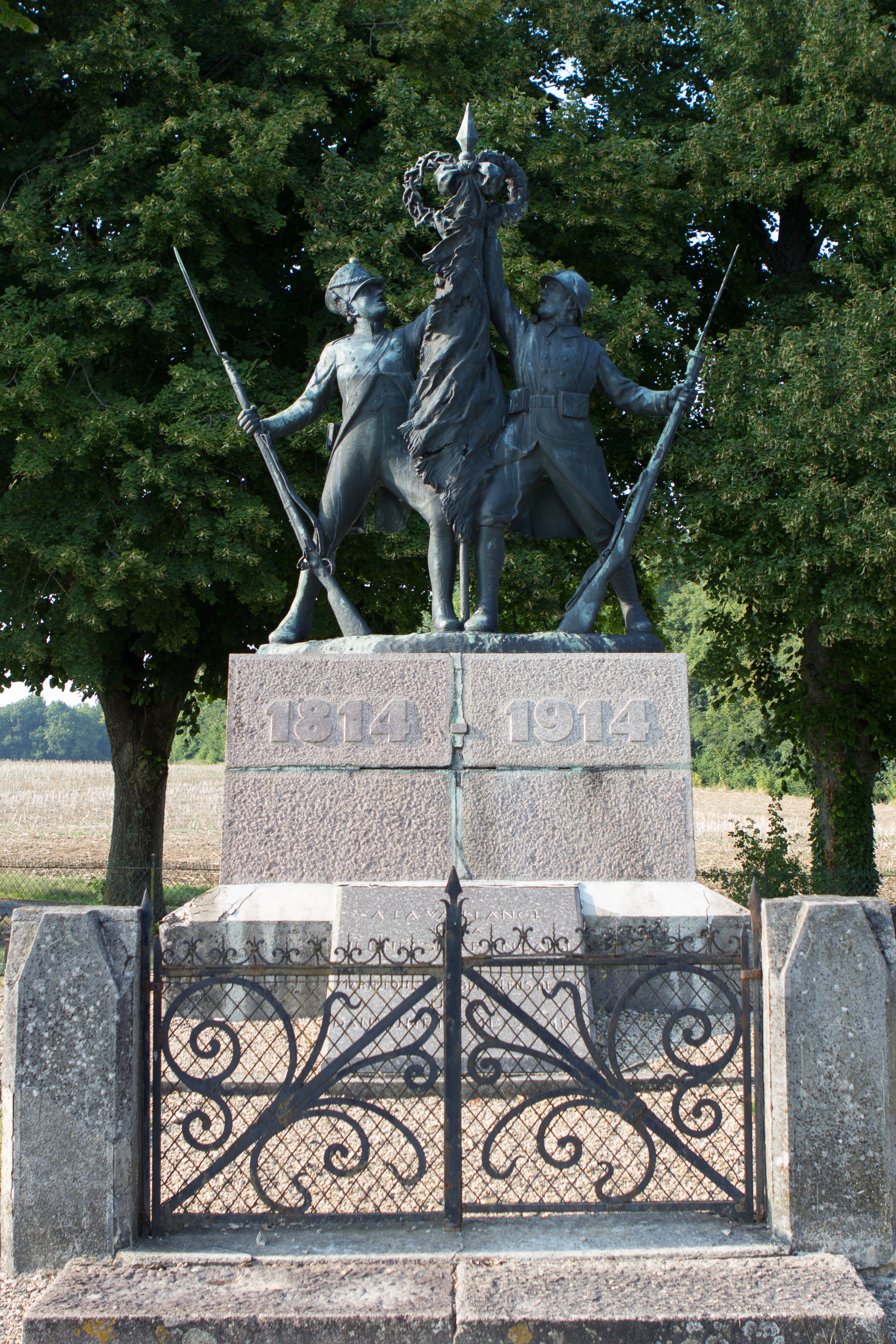
A monument to the Marie-Louises of 1814 and 1914 installed in 1927 at the site of the Battle of Craonne

The "Marie-Louises" were the conscripts, mostly teenage French boys, who were conscripted into Napoleon's French Imperial Army between October 1813 and 1815. On 9 October 1813, Empress of the French Marie Louise issued a decree ordering the conscription of 200,000 men into the army; as there was a shortage of military-age males in France, recruiting regulations were changed to allow for those as young as 14 and as short as 5 feet 1 inch (1.55 m) to be conscripted. The majority of Marie-Louises served in the campaign in north-east France from January to March 1814, defending against an invasion by the Sixth Coalition. Though they received as little as two weeks of training and would be soundly defeated in the War, French historians lionized the Marie-Louises as courageous youths motivated by patriotic ideals instead of being forced into military service.

The conscription of so many men proved unable to prevent the Sixth Coalition from defeating the French and occupying Paris, resulting in Napoleon's abdication on 13 April 1814, ending the War of the Sixth Coalition. Eventually, the term "Marie-Louises" was extended to anyone conscripted into the French Imperial army between 1813 and 1815, including when Napoleon briefly assumed power in France again during the Hundred Days. The Marie-Louises were featured in several works of art and literature, particularly after the outbreak of the Franco-Prussian War in 1870 to bolster French nationalism and patriotism. In 1914, the term was revived to describe Frenchmen conscripted into the French army after the outbreak of World War I.

== Background ==
Louis-Léopold Boilly's Departure of the Conscripts in 1807

Conscription in France was based on the Jourdan-Delbrel law of 1798 which required a military obligation (not necessarily service under arms) from men between 20 and 25 years old. The time in service was set at 3 years though this was extended at the discretion of the state in wartime. The proportion of men conscripted varied between departments and even between cantons of the same department. The age at conscription was reduced to 19 in December 1806 and the army took volunteers as young as 18. Conscription was unpopular, particularly in rural areas where conscripts had little confidence of ever seeing their home village again. Resistance against conscription took hold in several regions and the authorities were forced to repress this by force in 1809–10.

By 1813 Emperor Napoleon I's Grande Armée was severely depleted as a result of losses suffered in the unsuccessful 1812 invasion of Russia, the ongoing and unsuccessful Peninsular War and the ongoing German Campaign as well as from diseases such as typhus. Napoleon considered that he was 110,000 soldiers short of those needed to defend France ahead of an anticipated invasion of north-east France by the Sixth Coalition. He decided to extend conscription in the Empire to supply the necessary men.

== Levy decrees of 1813 ==
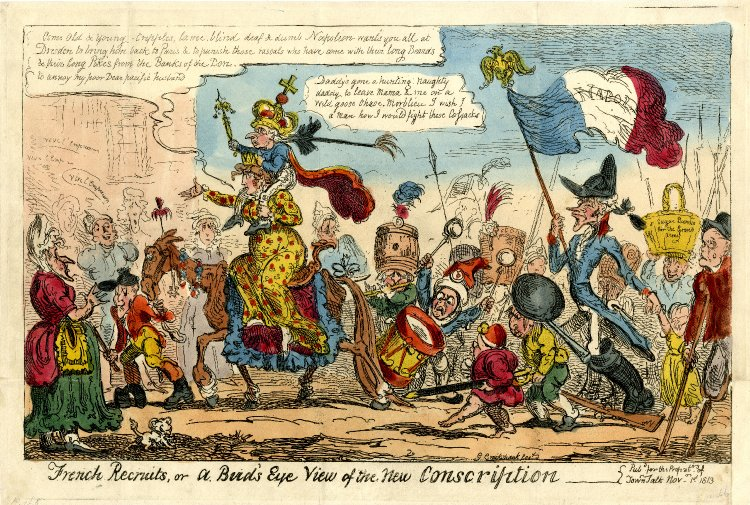
An 1813 political cartoon by George Cruikshank of 1813 depicting Marie Louise and her son leading a procession of crippled and infirm conscripts. She is depicted saying "Come Old & Young. Cripples, lame, blind deaf & dumb Napoleon wants you all at Dresden to bring him back to Paris".

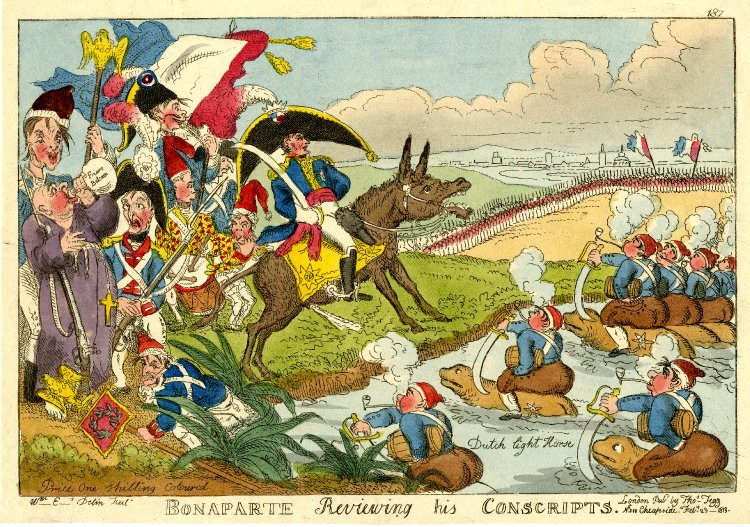
Another 1813 British cartoon satirising Napoleon's conscription decrees. French conscripts are shown as disorderly, short or crippled and include a drunken friar. At the right, Dutch light cavalrymen are shown mounting toads.

Napoleon's extended conscription was achieved through a series of levy laws and decrees, including the extension of the levy to age groups previously exempted:

- 11 January 1813: 100,000 men (who reached the age of 20 in 1809, 1810, 1811 and 1812)
- 11 January 1813: 100,000 men into the National Guard.
- 11 January 1813: 150,000 men who would have reached the age of 20 in 1814.
- 3 April 1813: 80,000 men into the National Guard.
- 3 April 1813: 90,000 men who would have reached the age of 20 in 1814.
- 3 April 1813: 10,000 men into the Guards of Honour
- 24 August 1813: 30,000 men who had reached the age of 20 between 1808 and 1814
- 9 October 1813: 120,000 men who would reach the age of 20 in or before 1814, later extended to 160,000 men, and 160,000 who would reach the age of 20 in 1815, implementation postponed to January 1814. This levy decree was signed by the Empress Marie-Louise but believed to have originated from Napoleon.
- 15 November 1813; 300,000 men who would have reached the age of 20 between 1802 and 1814.

In order to widen the pool of recruits the minimum height for conscripts was reduced to 5 feet 1 inch (1.55 m) from 5 feet 2 inches (1.57 m) (to which it had been reduced in 1810). Before the Napoleonic Wars the minimum height had been 5 feet 3 inches (1.60 m). In practice by 1814 the standard was merely nominal and in cases where conscripts had no other defects men shorter than 5 feet (1.5 m) were regularly accepted.

During the year continuing campaigns and the bottling up of French garrisons in strongholds following the loss at the Battle of Leipzig also reduced the forces available to the Emperor. By the end of the year, Napoleon's field army had fallen to just 70,000 men, of whom only 30–50,000 were effective at any given time.

The initial levies were a success in France until August when resistance began to appear. The levies in the occupied territories of Holland and Italy largely failed to meet their quotas and resulted in unrest. The October decrees of Marie-Louise did not respect the previous conventions of conscription, the exceptions being justified as necessary for le salut de la France ("the salvation of France"). The age at conscription was in some cases as low as 18, though such men were given assurances that they would not be deployed outside the boundaries of the Empire. Exemptions were allowed only for those physically incapable of service or who were the sole breadwinner for the family. The quota lottery, which allowed a portion of conscripts an exemption, was not used and the process was speeded up: conscripts would be posted to a regimental depot within 2 days of appearing before the conscription board.

The required quotas were not derived from populations of the departments but seem to have been based on the deficits from previous levies in each region. Areas under allied occupation or threat thereof were exempted as was Corsica, due to its remoteness. The levy was postponed in Pas-de-Calais, Somme, Nord, Deux-Sèvres, Vendée, Loire-Inférieur due to previous or ongoing civil disturbance and were not implemented in Loir-et-Cher, Indre-et-Loire, Côtes-du-Nord, Finistère and Vienne as these departments were still working to fill previous levy quotas. In addition the levy was postponed in 24 Midi departments until 11 February and in practice did not actually take place until 26 March. The initial Marie-Louise levy was therefore limited to parts of South-East France, Lyon and the immediate vicinity of Paris, the 32 departments closest to existing depots. Despite this the October levy was reasonably successful, the city of Paris supplied a significant proportion of these men who were said to have been in the "best spirit". However, the large levy of November was a total failure. By mid-January 1814 the rate of supply of conscripts to the field army was very slow owing to a state of "confusion and disorder" in the French interior.

== In service ==
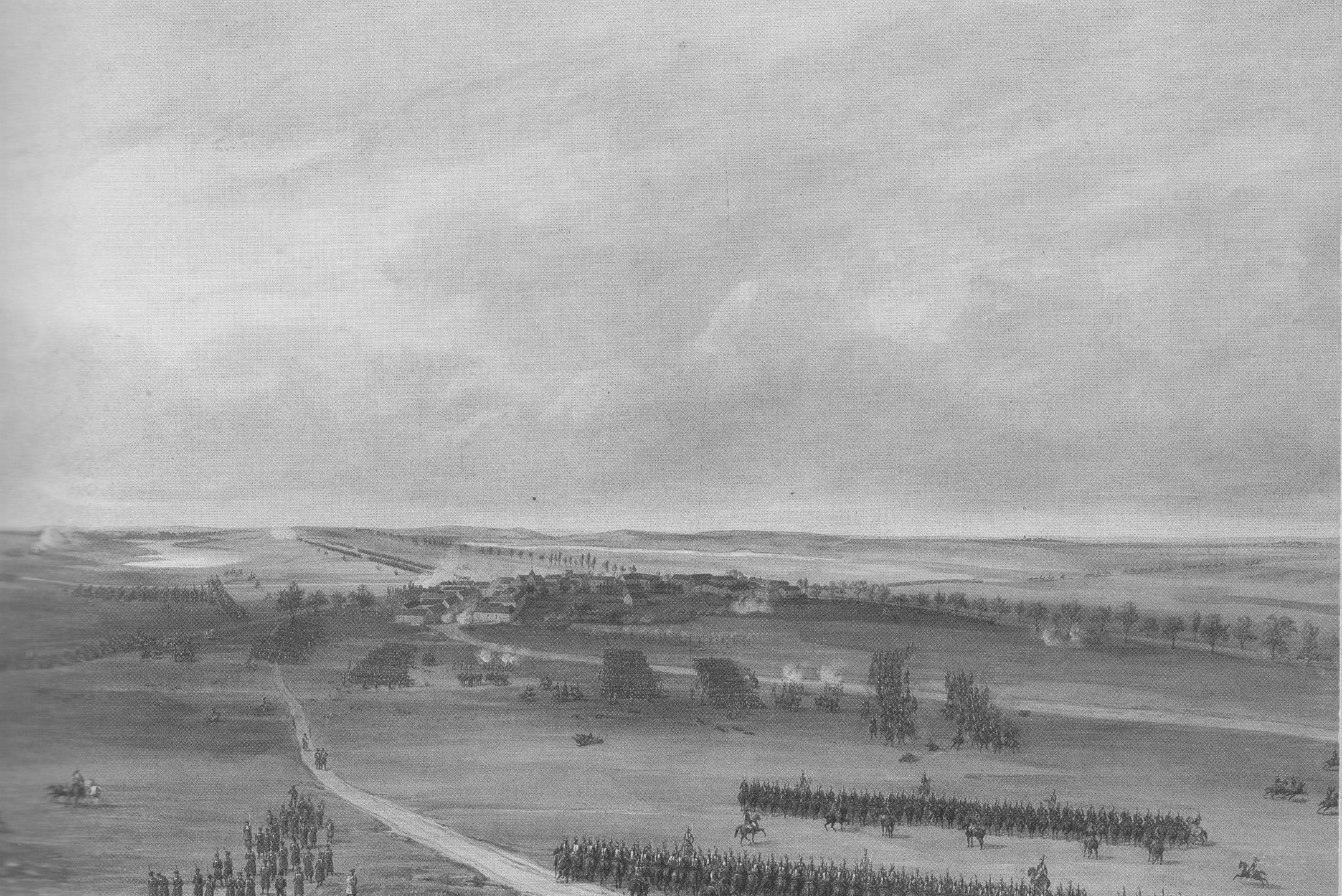
The Battle of Champaubert, 10 February 1814

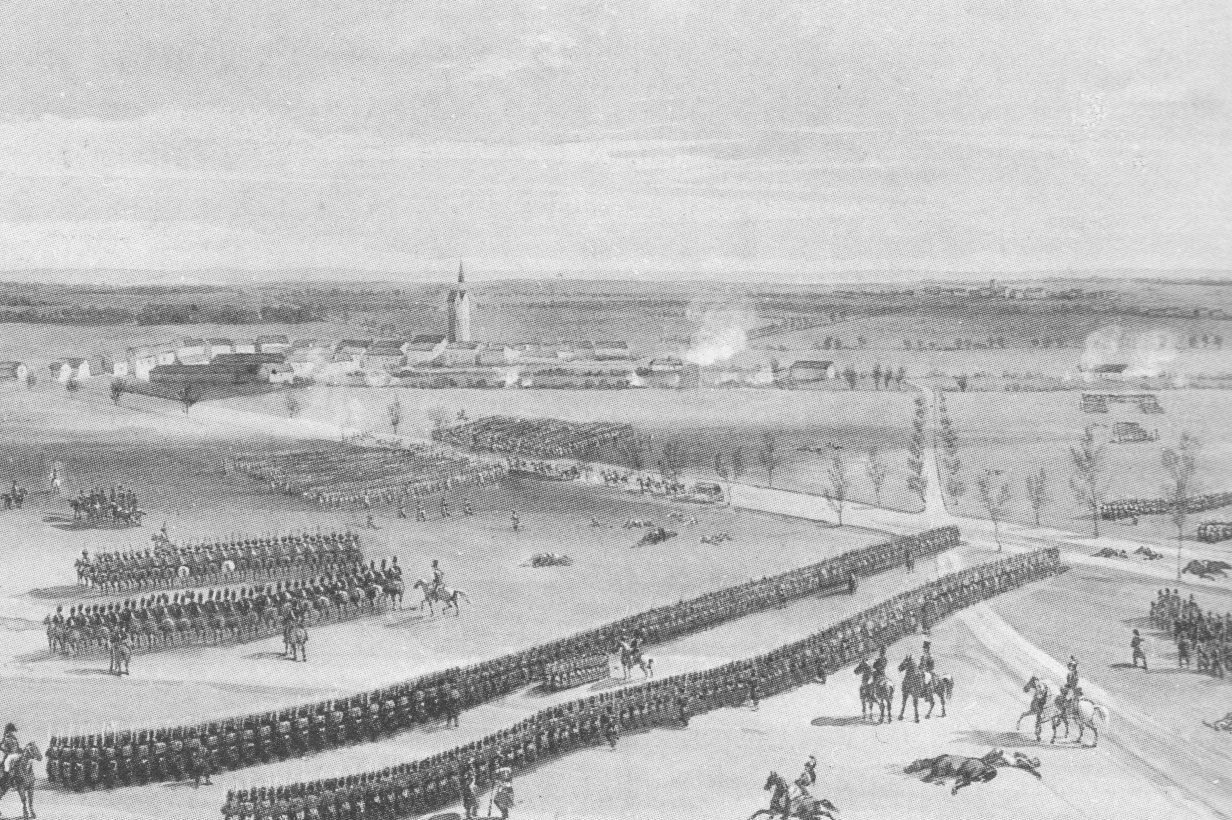
The Battle of Valjouan (Mormant), 17 February 1814

The number of men actually incorporated into the army from the Marie-Louise decrees has been estimated at only 25,000, of whom the majority (20,144) went into the Imperial Guard, mainly the Young Guard. They were initially incorporated gradually into the third battalions of the guard regiments but also formed the new 14e Regiment de Tirailleurs de la Garde Impériale, the 14e Régiment de Voltigeurs de la Garde Impériale and were incorporated into the guard artillery.

The conscripts received a hurried and abbreviated training programme, though Napoleon specified that all conscripts should receive some form of musketry training, even if much shortened. A training period as short as a fortnight was not uncommon, with few receiving as much as a month's training; this was less than the conscripts called in 1813 who had, in principle, 90 days training before joining their regiments. The men were generally poorly trained in the traditional soldier's skills of marksmanship, drill and skirmishing; though some had earlier experience with muskets in civilian life as poachers. A Colonel Fabvier noted that the conscripts assigned to the Young Guard received better training than the rest.

Napoleon recognised the limitations of poorly trained troops and requested that battalions formed entirely from conscripts be half the usual size to allow a better supervision ratio from these units’ officers and non-commissioned officers. He employed such units as a means of holding static positions in his lines, though the Young Guard saw service as shock troops, deployed en masse in compact formations. Morale was variable but generally good, with few attempts at self-mutilation to escape service being recorded. Marshal Auguste de Marmont recalled his experience of this time: "The troops showed great value. Conscripts, arrived the day before, entered the line, and behaved, with courage, like old soldiers. ... one, very quiet under enemy fire, did not, however, use his rifle. I said to him, 'Why don't you shoot?'. He replied naively: 'I would shoot as well as any other soldier if I had someone to load my gun.' The poor child was so ignorant of his profession".

The conscript units suffered high losses in the 1814 campaign (Napoleon said at the time "the Young Guard melts") and a reorganisation of the remnants of units was made on 12 March. By this time Napoleon's armies were too weak to resist the Sixth Coalition's invasion. Paris fell on 30–31 March and Napoleon retreated to Fontainebleau where he agreed to abdicate on 13 April, bringing the war to a close.

"They were called the Maries-Louises, these poor little soldiers suddenly uprooted from their homes and thrown, fifteen days after their conscription, into the furnace of battle. The name Maries-Louise, they inscribed in blood on a large page of history. They were Maries-Louises, these cuirassiers barely knowing how to ride, who, at the Battle of Valjouan, rode in five squadrons and sabered with such fury that they did not want to give quarter. They were Maries-Louises, those chasseurs of whom General Delort said when they approach the enemy "I think they lose their minds at being charged with such cavalry!", And who crossed Montereau like a whirlwind, overturning the Austrian battalions massed in the streets. It was a Marie-Louise, the tirailleur who, as indifferent to the music of bullets as to the sight of the men struck down around him, remained fixed in his place under a continuous fire, without responding himself, and replied to Marshal Marmont: I would shoot as well as another, but I don't know how to load my gun. It was a Marie-Louise, this chasseur who at the Battle of Champaubert captured General Olsufjew and only wanted to release him at the order of the emperor ... The Maries-Louises again, those voltigeurs of the 14th regiment of the Young Guard which at the Battle of Craonne remained for three hours on the crest of the plateau, within close range of the enemy batteries, the grapeshot of which killed 650 men out of 920! They were without a cape in eight degrees of cold, they walked in the snow with bad shoes, they sometimes lacked bread, they barely knew how to use their weapons ... and during the whole campaign no cry came out of their ranks except an acclamation for the emperor." — French historian Henry Houssaye, 1888

== History of use of the term ==
If, among so many good people, I dared to make a particular mention, it would be for the youngest; conscripted and hastily incorporated, their innocence, their simplicity, amused the old soldiers; their clothing consisted of a grey frock coat and a feminine hat. They were called the Maries-Louises. These children lacked strength and training; but honour replaced these, and their courage was indomitable

— Colonel Fabvier writing in 1819

The term is used as Marie-Louise in the singular and Marie-Louises or Maries-Louises in the plural. There is no precise historical definition for the name; historians are divided broadly into three camps. The most restrictive is that to those raised only in 1815 by the decrees of Empress Marie-Louise signed on 9 October 1813. Others use it to describe all conscripts of 1814 and 1815 and a third group for any of those conscripted between 1813 and 1815. The term now generally now applies to all young soldiers who served in the last years of the empire.

The term is believed to have originated among the grognards ("grumblers") of the Old Guard, as a manifestation of the black humour widespread in France towards the end of the war. Although common in the writings of military veterans such as Fabvier it was not picked up by military historians for many years. Houssaye, writing in the 1880s, was the first to use it to refer to individuals - earlier historians had referred only to "young conscripts" or "inexperienced conscripts".

The use of the term, with its associations with popular support for the Imperial cause, declined over time as political attitudes changes in France. Few textbooks of the pre-First World War years make use of the term. However, it saw a resurgence in popularity in 1914-15 as men were called up for duty in that war and came to be applied to this class also. Houssaye's quotation was used during this time to refer to the fervour of the new conscripts but the conscripts of this war were far better trained than their forebears.

A French soldier with the German army, Guy Sajer, noted in his The Forgotten Soldier that young Germans drafted at the end of the Second World War were compared by him and his comrades to the Marie-Louise conscripts.

== In art and literature ==
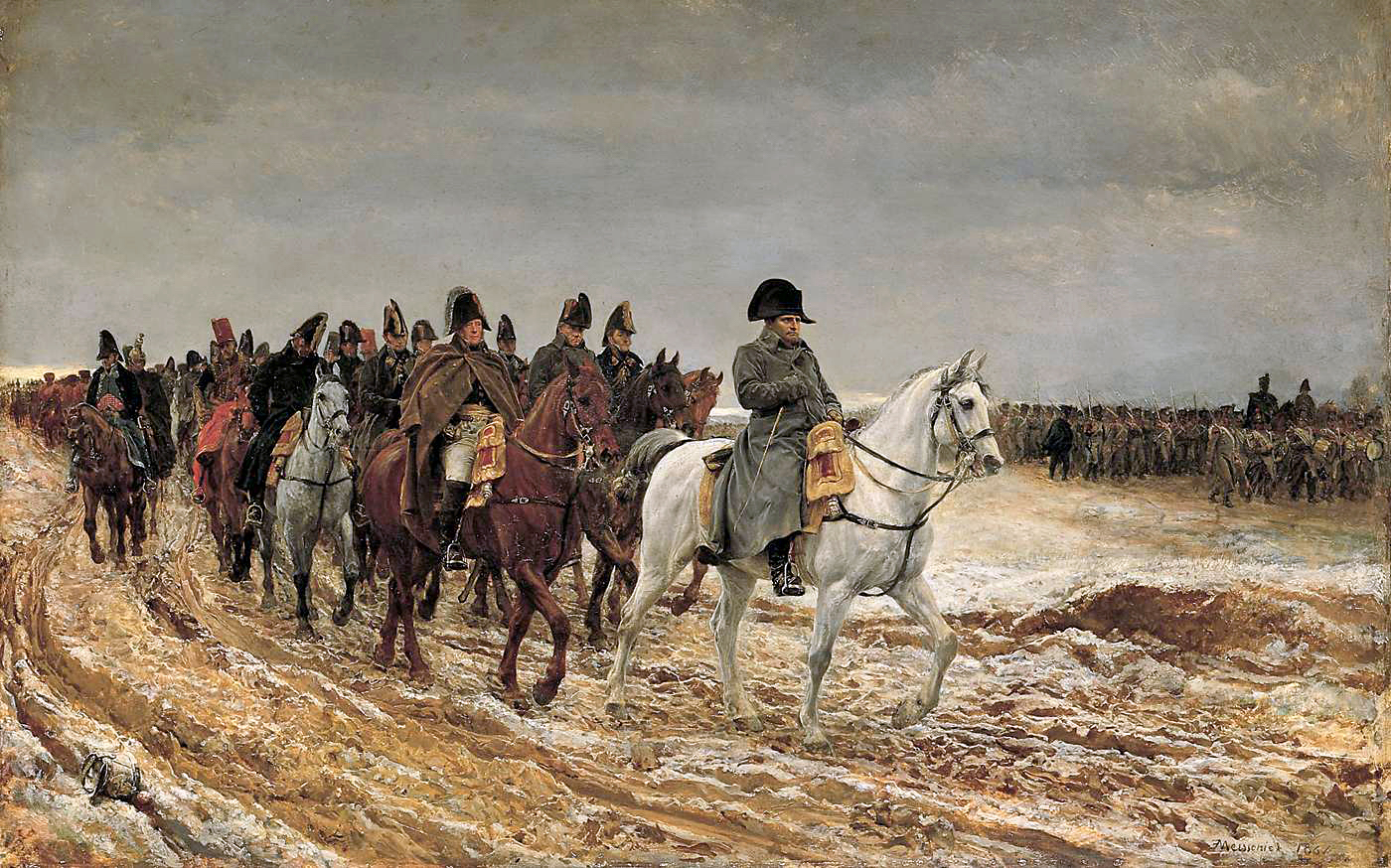
Meissonier's 1864 Campagne de France, 1814 depicts a column of conscripts in the background

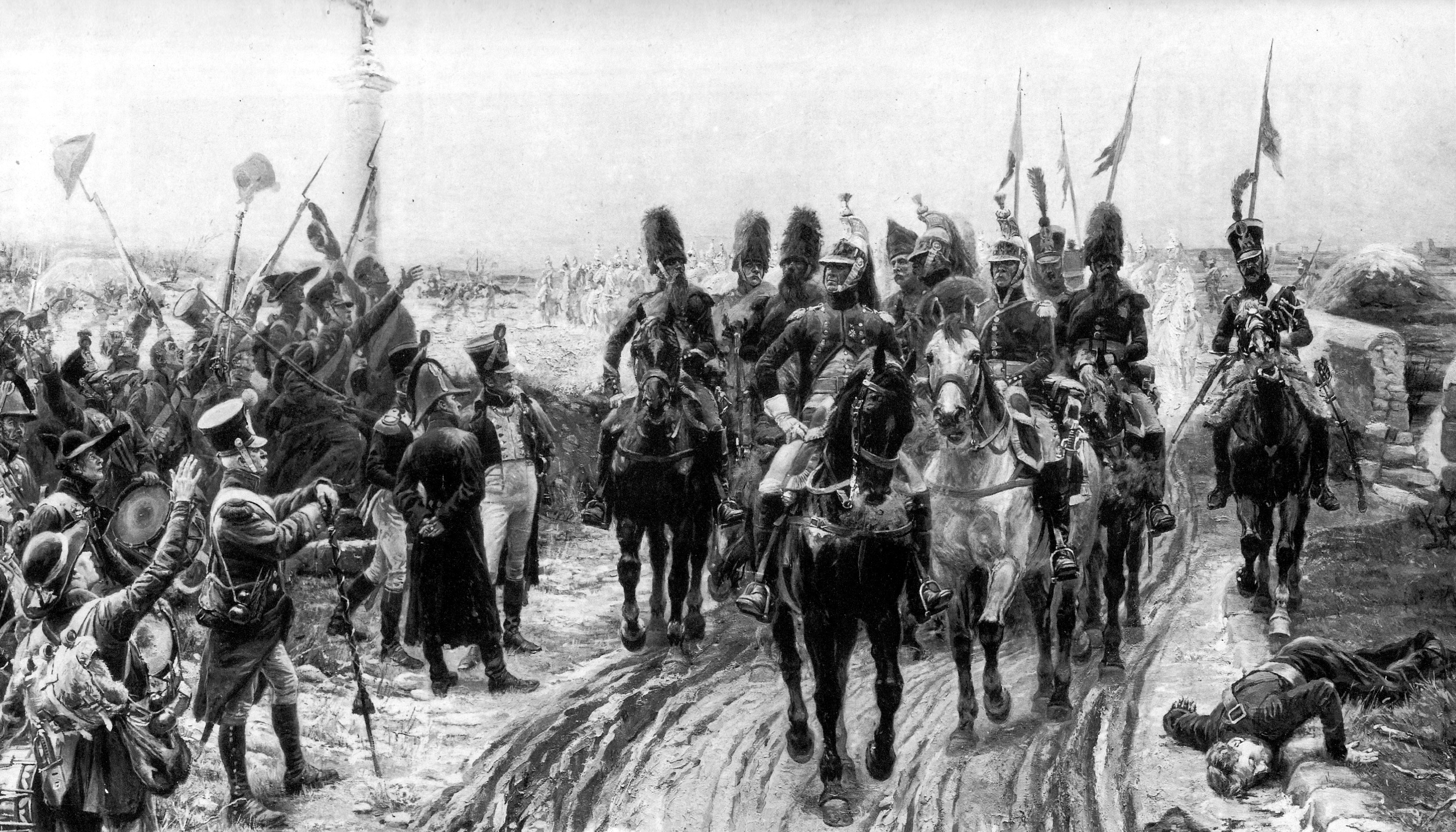
Lalauze's Le retour des dragons de l'armée d'Espagne

The term did not find immediate use in works of art and literature. Even when depicting conscripts of the Napoleonic Era artists of the Bourbon Restoration such as Nicolas Toussaint Charlet and Auguste Raffet do not use the term. Indeed, the conscripts are not a popular subject for art of the time. This may have been because their simple uniform of hat, cape and musket was not visually appealing. one of the few pre-1870 depictions may be in Ernest Meissonier's 1864 Campagne de France, 1814 which may depict a column of conscripts in the background. Adolphe Lalauze's Le retour des dragons de l'armée d'Espagne ("the return of the dragoons from the Army of Spain") shows a group of Marie-Louises welcoming the cavalry recalled by Napoleon from Spain to the army in France. Depictions of the Marie-Louises in art increased after 1870 as the Franco-Prussian War inspired artists to draw upon the spirit of 1814. The first work of art to be named after the Marie-Louises was Pierre Victor Robiquet's Les Maries-Louises à Champaubert showing a unit of conscripts in square facing Russian cossacks at the 10 February 1814 Battle of Champaubert.

Erckmann-Chatrian's 1864 novel Histoire d’un conscrit de 1813 and its sequel Waterloo has become associated with the Marie-Louises. The novels are anti-imperialistic and anti-militaristic and centre on an apprentice watchmaker from Phalsbourg who is conscripted into Napoleon's army. Other French literature from the 19th century tends to focus on volunteer soldiers. There are only two notable novels whose titles include "Marie-Louise": 2004 work Le "Marie-Louise" de l’Empereur, whose hero is actually a volunteer soldier at the Battle of Montereau and Edward Montier's 1911 Marie-Louises whose characters attempt to escape conscription but join the French army in its hour of need.

There was a resurgence of interest in the Marie-Louises during the First World War, due to France once more calling upon conscripts when threatened with invasion. A monument at the site of the Battle of Craonne which honoured the original Marie-Louises was destroyed in fighting early in the war. It was replaced in 1927 with a new monument that honoured the conscripts of 1814 and those of 1914. Its central feature is a statue of an 1814 soldier and a 1914 poilu, who together hold up a French standard. The sculpture takes some artistic license in depicting the 1814 soldier in a standard 1812 army uniform, not the limited equipment that would have been worn by the typical 1814 conscript.
