= Guards of Honour (France) =

Napoleonic era cavalry unit

- Gardes d'Honneur
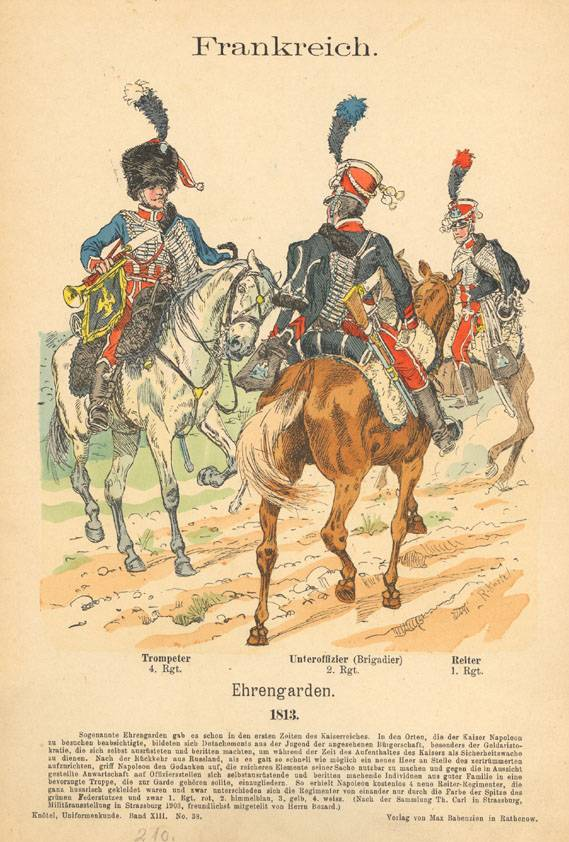
- Gallery of uniforms of the Guards of Honour, from left to right: Trumpeter of the 4th Regiment, Brigadier (Corporal) of the 2nd Regiment, and Chevalier (Private) of the 1st Regiment.
- Active: April 1813 – May 1814
- Country: France
- Branch: (France) French Imperial Army
- Type: Light Cavalry
- Role: Reconnaissance
- Size: Four regiments
- Part of: Imperial Guard; Young Guard
- Garrison/HQ: 1st: Versailles; 2nd: Metz; 3rd: Tours; 4th: Lyon
- Nicknames: "The Hostages" "Garde Douleur", 'The Woeful Guard'
- Engagements: Napoleonic Wars; Battle of Leipzig; Battle of Hanau; Battle of Strasbourg; Battle of Reims; Siege of Paris

The Guards of Honour (French: Gardes d'Honneur) were light cavalry regiments raised in the French Imperial Army during the Napoleonic Wars in 1813. Napoleon was short of cavalry following his failed invasion of Russia and the Guards were raised to remedy this. Drawn from members of the nobility, most were already experienced riders, so lengthy horsemanship training was not required. They were expected to provide their own uniforms, horses and equipment, which lessened the burden on the French treasury.

== Background ==
In June 1812, Napoleon I led his Grande Armée of 400,000 men on an invasion of Russia. Six months later, after enduring guerrilla warfare and the onset of the Russian Winter hundreds of thousands of men had been killed, wounded, captured, or had deserted or otherwise lost from his forces; he retreated with an army numbering just tens of thousands. Napoleon needed to reform the Grande Armée to defend his empire and, upon reaching the Duchy of Warsaw, he left the remnants of his army and returned to France. He was unwilling to draw more men from the French army in Spain, where it was fighting the Peninsular War against British, Portuguese and Spanish troops, and therefore had to raise fresh troops.

While Napoleon could fill infantry units rapidly with conscripts, the cavalry had suffered huge losses of men and horses in Russia, and took longer to raise, as it took considerable time to train men to ride and fight on horseback and Napoleon had few experienced non-commissioned officers (NCOs) to use as trainers since most had been promoted to fill officer vacancies. Men with riding experience and the capability to operate independently were essential for the light cavalry, as they were expected to serve as scouts in the field and to operate without the direct supervision of officers and senior NCOs. It was reckoned that it took three years to train an efficient light cavalryman, time that Napoleon did not have.

Napoleon turned instead to the French nobility, who were accustomed to riding, and could supply their own uniforms, equipment, and horses. He had previously attempted to attract such men into his army, forming the Gendarmerie d'ordonnance de la Garde impériale in 1806. Some 394 men from well-born families joined, but the unit was disbanded a year later after jealousy from the rest of the Imperial Guard. Forming another such unit in 1813 would also provide Napoleon with a pool of potentially valuable hostages from well-placed families, important at a time when his power was threatened by the defeat in Russia.

== Formation ==
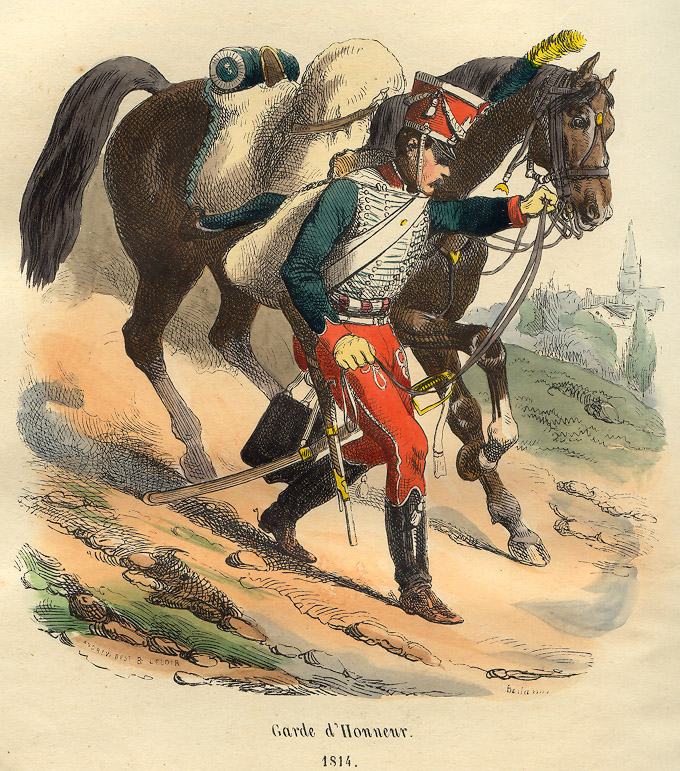
A member of the Guards of Honour

The Guards of Honour (French: Gardes d'honneur) were ordered to be formed on 3 April 1813 by a sénatus-consulte and established by decree on 5 April. Four regiments were ordered: the 1st Regiment based at Versailles, the 2nd at Metz, the 3rd at Tours and the 4th at Lyon. Each regiment had a staff of 65 men and 156 horses, and 20 companies (paired into 10 squadrons) each of 122 men and 127 horses, totalling 2,505 men and 2,696 horses. The Guards of Honour thus added 10,000 cavalrymen to the Grande Armée. The men were required to be citizens of the 130 departments of the First French Empire, which included territories now belonging to Italy, the Netherlands, Germany, Switzerland and Belgium as well as Metropolitan France. NCOs were selected from among the enlisted members, though selection consisted of little more than choosing the "likely looking men". The officers were drawn from those already serving: the regimental colonels were existing generals and the unit's majors were existing line cavalry colonels; other officers transferred into the unit with their existing ranks. Regimental commanders were selected from leading members of the nobility in an effort to attract others of that class.

As well as the traditional nobility, the unit included members of the arriviste class and some poor men, paid to enlist as replacements by men who did not want to serve. Many of the members had royalist or foreign backgrounds and were often keenly aware of their position as de facto hostages of Napoleon. In some cases the minimum service age of 18 was ignored; at Tours, of the 63 Guards of Honour recruited in 1813, 11 were 17 and one was 16 years old (the average age of Guards recruited there was 20 years 6 months).

The Guards of Honour wore hussar-style uniforms and their undress uniform was similar to that of the Mounted Chasseurs of the Imperial Guard. Although they were closely associated with the Imperial Guard cavalry (and often served with them in the field) they were not officially part of that force, though many members of the Guards of Honour considered themselves as such. The Guards of Honour were paid on the same scales as the Chasseurs à Cheval of the Imperial Guard, and the unit's trumpeters wore the sky blue uniforms of the Imperial Guard rather than the green of the line cavalry. Though technically classed as volunteers, the Guards of Honour have been described as Marie-Louises, a name given to conscripts of the years 1813–14 after Napoleon's empress, who signed some of the conscription orders.

Each regiment enlisted soldiers from different parts of the empire, and every department received instructions about the contingents of guardsmen that they had to muster:

- 1st Regiment to be organised from the 1st (Paris), 14th (Caen), 15th (Rouen), 16th (Lille), 24th (Brussels), and 30th Military Divisions (Rome) with quotas totalling between 1,248 and 2,496 men
- 2nd Regiment to be organised from the 2nd (Mézières), 3rd (Metz), 4th (Nancy), 5th (Strasbourg), 17th (Amsterdam), 18th (Dijon), 25th (Wesel), 26th (Mainz), and 28th Military Divisions (Genoa) with quotas totalling between 1,205 and 2,410 men
- 3rd Regiment to be organised from the 10th (Toulouse), 11th (Bordeaux), 12th (La Rochelle), 13th (Rennes), 20th (Périgueux), 22nd (Tours), 29th (Florence), and 31st Military Divisions (Groningen) with quotas totalling between 1,242 and 2,484 men
- 4th Regiment to be organised from the 6th (Besançon), 7th (Grenoble), 8th (Toulon), 9th (Montpellier), 19th (Lyon), 21st (Bourges), 23rd (Bastia, Corsica), 27th (Turin), and 32nd Military Divisions (Hamburg) with quotas totalling between 1,242 and 2,484 men

== German campaign of 1813 ==
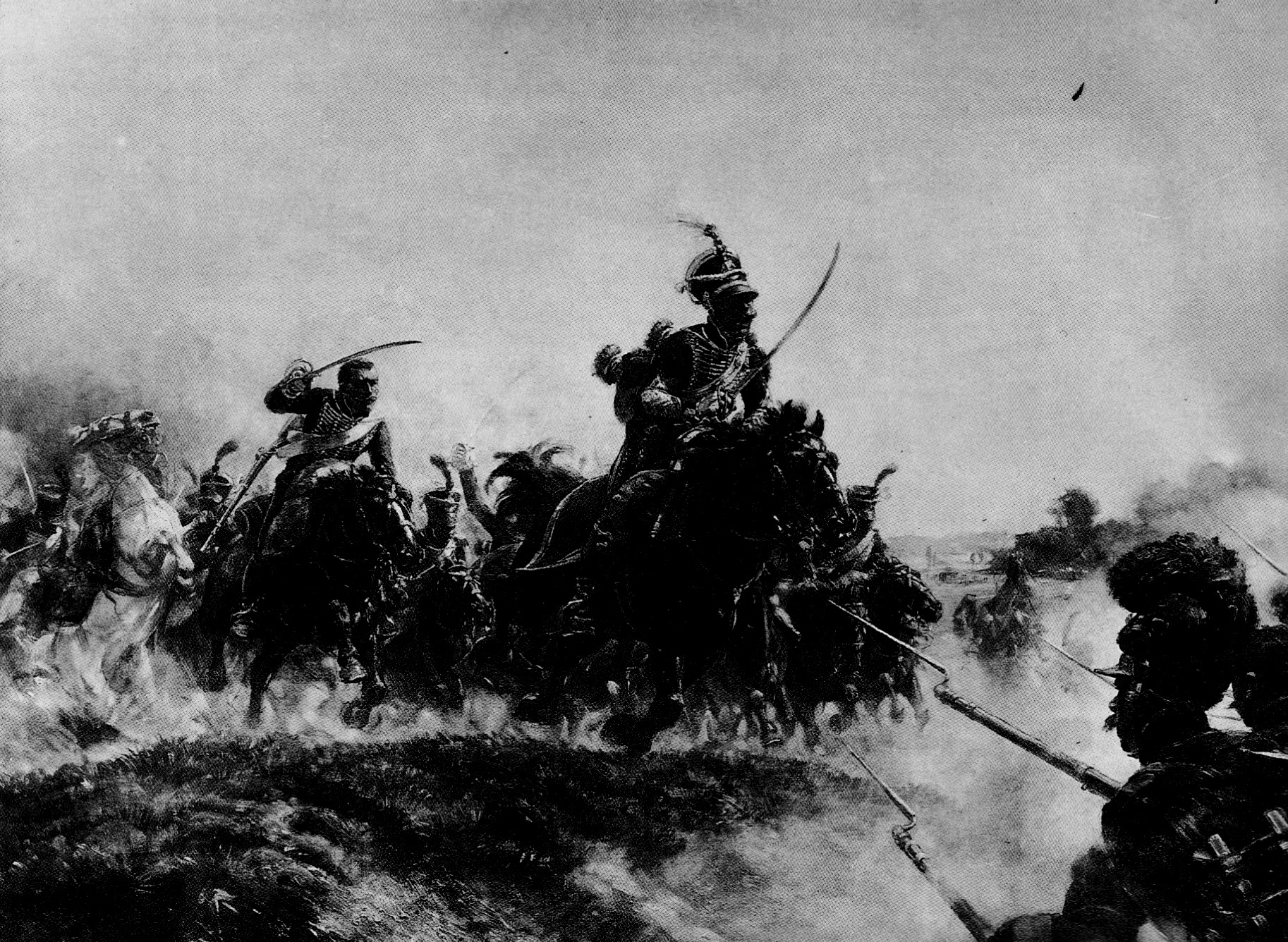
The 3rd Regiment of the Guards of Honour charge during the Battle of Hanau

The Guards of Honour served in the German campaign of 1813 and by 15 September they formed part of the 3rd Imperial Guard Cavalry Division. By this time the 1st Regiment of the Guards had been reduced in strength to 13 officers and 354 men. The regiments fought at the Battle of Hanau on 30 October. Advancing to the battle through a forest in company with the Imperial Guard cavalry they suffered casualties from artillery fire. Alongside the Imperial Guard cavalry they charged a unit of Bavarian cavalry that threatened to overrun the Imperial Guard artillery. The Guards went on to capture an Austro-Bavarian artillery unit.

The Guards of Honour were not committed with the rest of their division and the 2nd Cavalry Corps to a charge on the enemy cavalry later in the battle led by General Horace François Bastien Sébastiani de La Porta. However, when this charge got into difficulty the 3rd Guards of Honour, numbering around 400 men, was ordered into the fray by General Rémy Joseph Isidore Exelmans. Despite being exhausted by early manoeuvring and having gone 24 hours without food, the regiment saved the Mounted Grenadiers of the Imperial Guard, who were being driven back. The Guards of Honour were complimented on their conduct at Hanau by Napoleon, and a number of its soldiers were awarded the Legion of Honour. By December morale in the unit remained high, though it was notably lower among the Dutch, Italian and German members.

== Campaign in north-east France (1814) ==
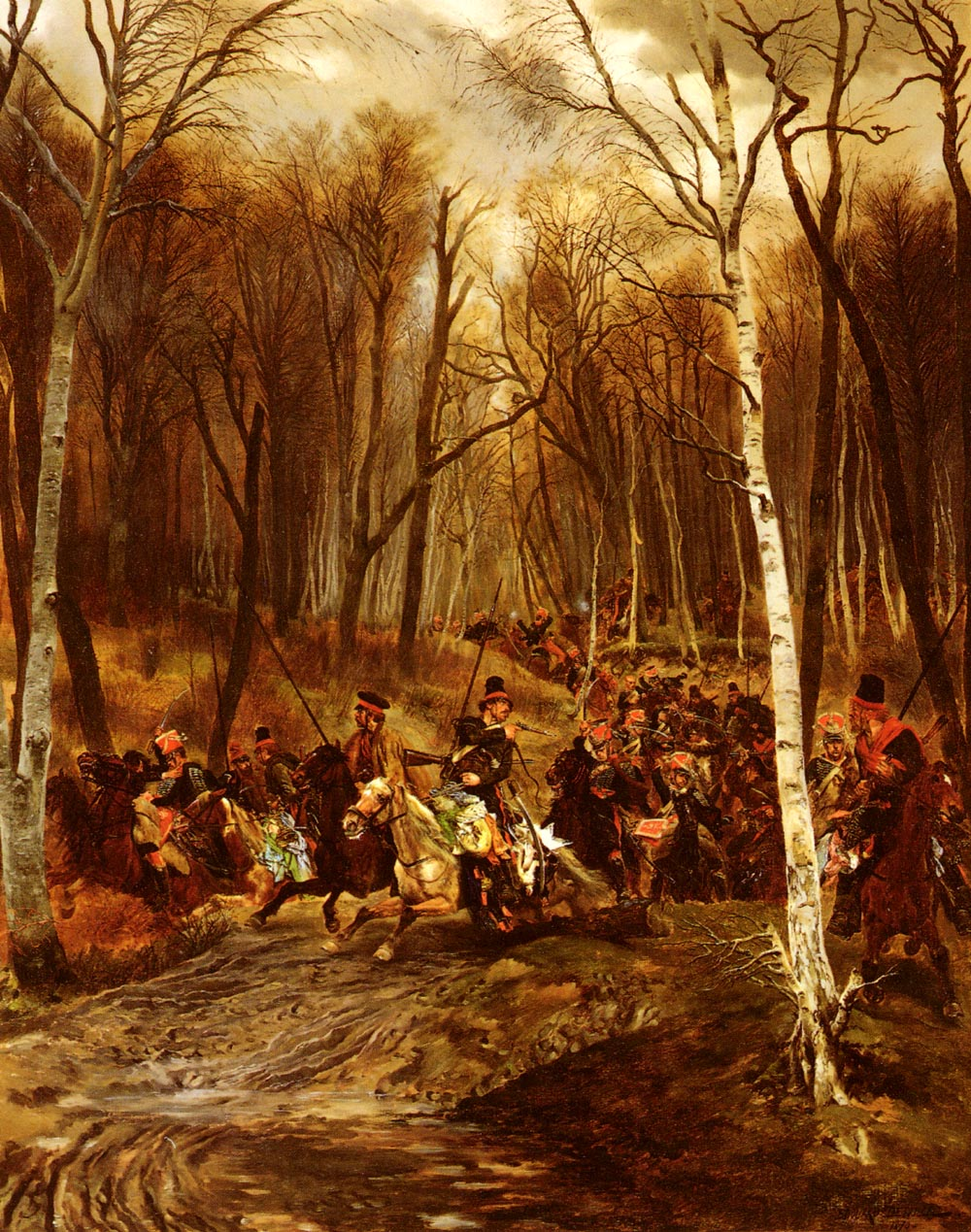
Cossacks attack a unit of the Guards

The Guards of Honour also participated in the Campaign in north-east France (1814). A commemorative plaque on the battlefield marks the involvement of the 3rd Regiment in the 12 February Battle of Château-Thierry. The Guards also fought at the 12–13 March Battle of Reims (1814).

After the abdication of Napoleon part of the Guards of Honour provided the escort for the entry of the restored king Louis XVIII to Paris. Louis ordered the Guards to disband by Royal Ordinance on 24 June 1814. General Exelmans supervised the disbanding of the 1st Regiment at Versailles on 14 July. The 2nd Regiment disbanded on 15 July, the 3rd at Tours on 17 July and the 4th at Rambouillet on 22 July. Around 900 of the Frenchmen in the unit were accepted into Louis' bodyguard (the Garde du Corps) with the rank of second lieutenant. The members from outside the new boundaries of France returned home.

== Status ==
Throughout the Guards of Honour's history, the status of the unit was brought into question many times. According to Pawley, "The Guards of Honour were never an official part of the Imperial Guard". Smith however notes that the Guards of Honour "[were] incorporated into the Guard on 29 July 1813". Bukhari states "They were therefore in the Guard but not of it".
