= Mounted Chasseurs of the Imperial Guard =

- Chasseurs à cheval de la Garde impériale
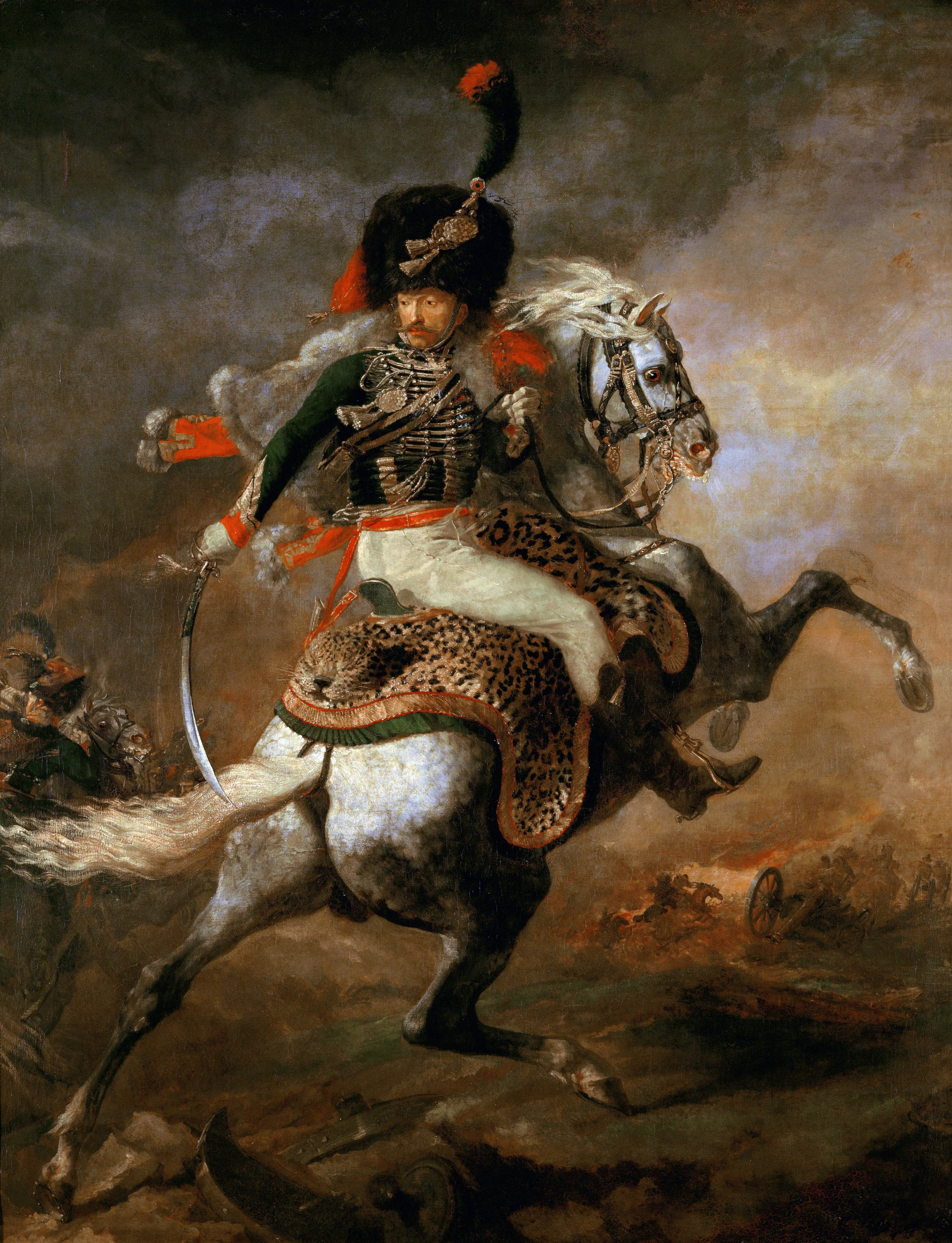
- c. 1812 painting of a regimental officer by Théodore Géricault
- Active: 1800 – 1814; 1815
- Country: (France) French Republic (to 1804) (France) French Empire
- Branch: French Imperial Army
- Type: Light cavalry
- Size: Largest at 2 regiments
- Part of: Consular Guard (to 1804); Imperial Guard
- HQ & Dépôt: École Militaire in Paris
- Nicknames: The Invincibles; The Pet Children
- Patron: the Emperor
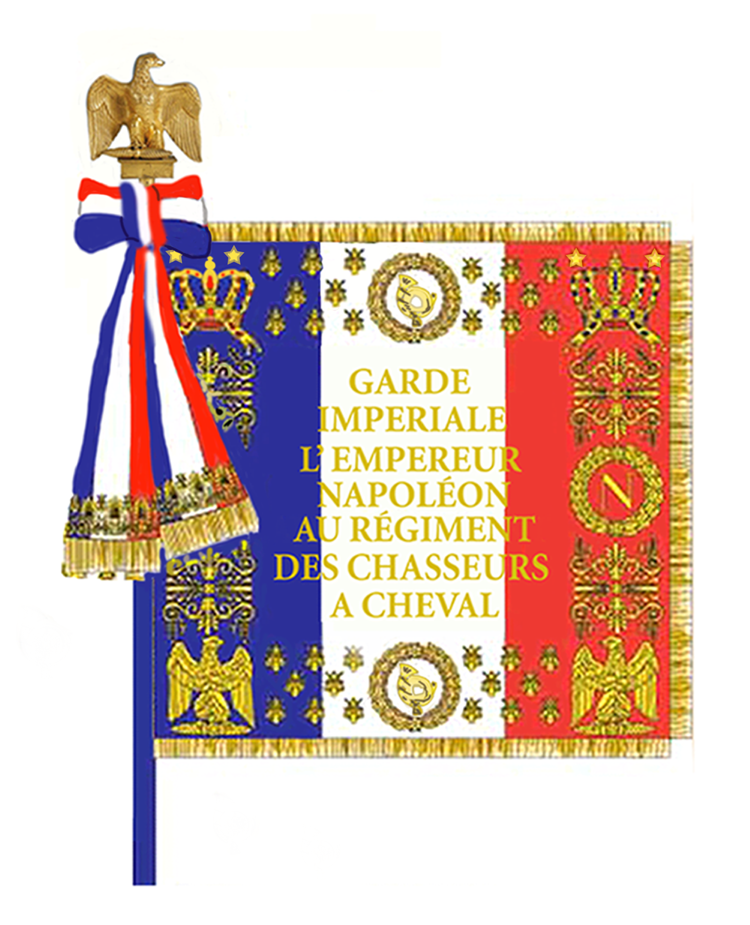
- Colors
- Engagements: Marengo, Ulm, Austerlitz, Eylau, Friedland, Eckmühl, Wagram, Smolensk, Borodino, Maloyaroslavets, Dresden, Leipzig, Hanau, Château-Thierry, Craonne, Waterloo

Commanders
- Notable commanders: Eugène de Beauharnais; Nicolas Dahlmann (second-in-command); Claude Étienne Guyot (second-in-command); Charles, comte Lefebvre-Desnouettes; Charles Lallemand (second-in-command)

The Mounted Chasseurs of the Imperial Guard (French: Chasseurs à cheval de la Garde impériale) constituted a light cavalry regiment in the Consular, then Imperial Guard during the French Consulate and First French Empire respectively. They were the second senior "Old Guard" cavalry regiment of the Imperial Guard, after the Grenadiers à Cheval. The regiment had its origins in the Guides raised by General Napoleon Bonaparte during his Italian campaign of 1796. It was the Chasseurs that usually provided personal escort to him, and he often wore the uniform of the regiment in recognition of this service. The regiment was not only known for its lavish uniform, but its combat history as well.

== Service history ==
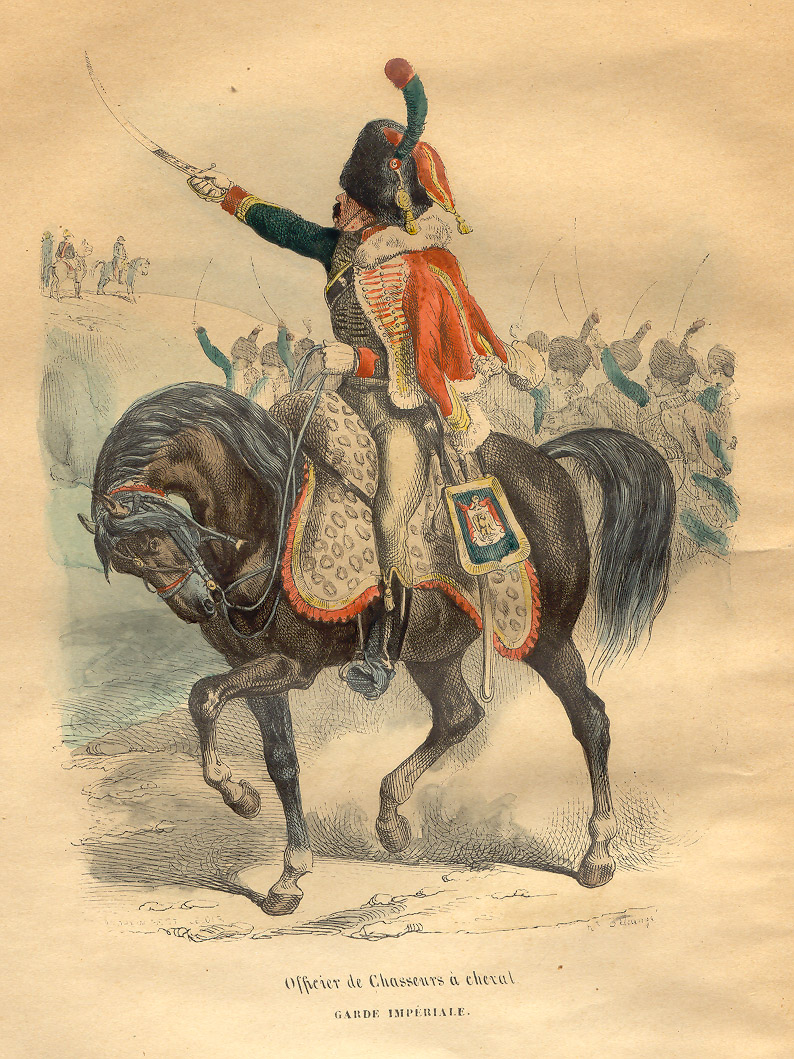
Chasseur à Cheval of the Imperial Guard

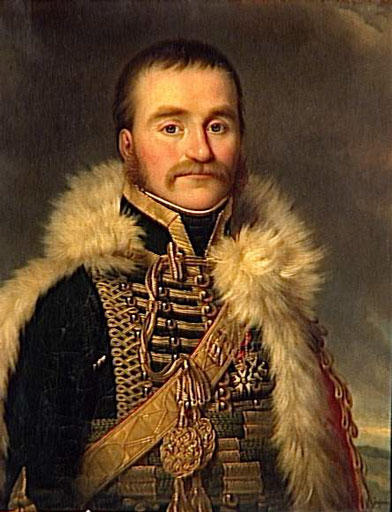
General Nicolas Dahlmann who died at the battle of Eylau, leading the Chasseurs of the Guard.

When at the end of August 1799 Bonaparte left Egypt to return to France, he took with him a detachment of 180 Guides à cheval and 125 Guides à pied. The men chosen were the most devoted veterans from each company. Soon after the coup d'état of 18 Brumaire, the Guides, who had stayed in the south of France, were summoned to Paris and quartered in the Caserne de Babylone. A decree of 28 November reorganized the Garde du Directoire as the Garde des Consuls, but it makes no mention of the Chasseurs.

By a decree of 3 January 1800, a company of Chasseurs à cheval was created. Its commanding officer was Napoleon's stepson, captain Eugène de Beauharnais, who was promoted major on 5 March. The strength was 4 officers and 113 men, the latter being chosen from the Guides who had returned from Egypt, and 112 were veterans of the Italian Campaign of 1796. The cavalry of the Garde Consulaire – two squadrons of Grenadiers à Cheval and the company of chasseurs – was commanded by Chef de brigade Jean-Baptiste Bessières. In May, the company left Paris for Italy. It crossed the Great St Bernard Pass and was heavily engaged at the Battle of Marengo (14 June), losing 70 out of its 115 horses. At the end of the campaign, the corps returned to Paris. By a consular decree of 8 September, it was augmented, becoming a squadron of two companies (troops) and 234 men.

By a decree of 6 August 1801, the corps was increased to a headquarters and two squadrons. The staff was: 1 chef d'escadron, 1 adjudant-major, 2 porte-étendard, 1 brigadier-trompette, and 4 maîtres-ouvriers. At the end of September, the remainder of the Guides returned from Egypt and were merged into the corps. By a decree of 14 November, the chasseurs became a regiment. In theory, the commanding officer was to be a Chef de brigade, but in fact Bonaparte retained Chef d'escadron Beauharnais in command.

By decree of 8 March 1802, the Headquarters was increased. It now included four standard-bearers, a trumpet major, two trumpet corporals and a timbalier (kettle-drummer). By decree of 1 October, the regiment was increased to four squadrons, with a total strength of 56 officers and 959 men. Beauharnais was promoted Chef de brigade (13 October) and now had as his squadron commanders Morland, Nicolas Dahlmann, Frédéric Auguste de Beurmann and Joseph Damingue, a black man who had distinguished himself at the Bridge of Arcole in 1796.

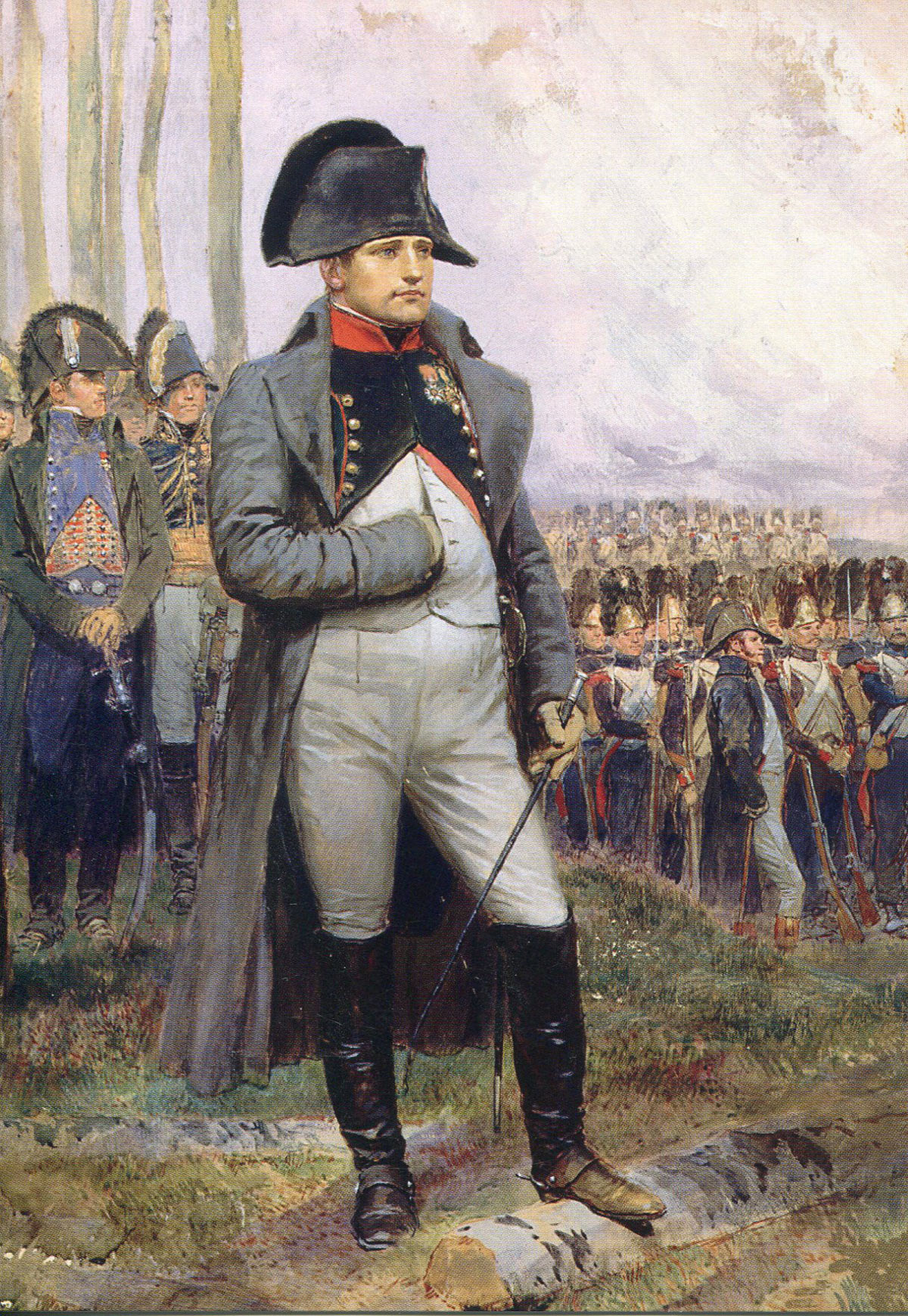
Napoleon I is often represented in his green colonel uniform of the Chasseurs à Cheval, with a large bicorne and a hand-in-waistcoat gesture.

From 22 March 1803, when summer training (travail d'été) began, the men were to parade on horseback every Monday and Thursday at 7.30 a.m. precisely on the Champ de Mars. Every Wednesday at the same hour, they went through the foot exercise. In winter, the parades seem to have been at 9.00 a.m. Swimming and rowing were among the exercises carried out in 1802 and 1803.

By a decree of 21 January 1804, the regiment was given a major who was to rank with the colonels of the line. Morland was given this appointment. By the same decree, the company of Mamluks was attached to the regiment. By an Order of the Day of 18 May, the Garde des Consuls became the Garde Impériale, as the First French Empire was formed.

On 13 May 1805, Beauharnais was made Viceroy of Italy, but he retained nominal command of the regiment until about 1808. Morland now became the actual commanding officer with the title of Colonel Commandant en second, and Dahlmann was promoted major. On 17 September, a squadron of vélites (four companies) was created. It seems to have been intended as a kind of holding reinforcement unit. The regiment and the Mamluks greatly distinguished themselves at the Battle of Austerlitz (2 December), where two squadrons and the Mamluks were led to the charge by Napoleon's senior aide-de-camp, General Jean Rapp, inflicting heavy casualties on the Russian Imperial Guard and capturing Prince Repnin, the commander of the Chevalier Guard. At Austerlitz, the Chasseurs suffered 19 officer casualties, including Morland, killed, and three squadron commanders wounded. Dahlmann succeeded Morland and Claude-Étienne Guyot became major.

The regiment missed the Battle of Jena (14 October 1806), where the 1st Hussars had the privilege of escorting the Emperor. The Chasseurs did, however, take part in Napoleon's triumphal entry into Berlin. At the Battle of Eylau (8 February 1807), the regiment took part in Marshal Joachim Murat's great charge of 80 squadrons, which relieved the pressure on the French centre at the crisis of the battle. Seventeen of the officers were hit and Dahlmann was mortally wounded. He had recently been promoted general (30 December 1806), but having no command, he asked to be allowed to lead his old regiment and fell at their head. Major Guyot commanded the regiment for the rest of the year, and Thiry was also promoted major (16 February).

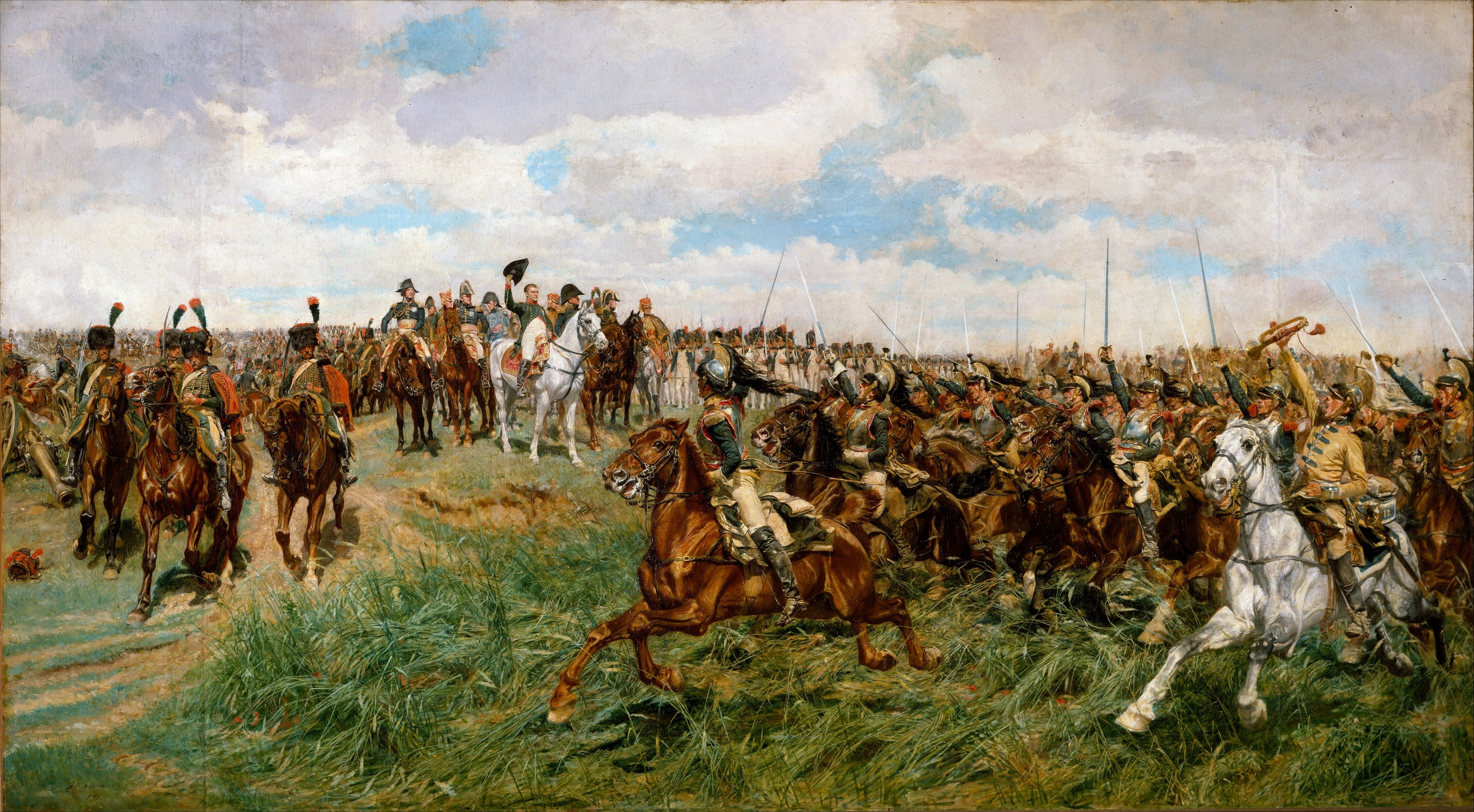
Chasseurs à cheval (on the left) protecting Napoleon at the Battle of Friedland, while cuirassiers salute him before their charge. Napoleon is again in his green colonel uniform of the Chasseurs à Cheval.

On 18 January 1808, Général de Brigade Charles Lefebvre-Desnouettes replaced Dahlmann in command of the regiment. The regiment was in Madrid when the populace rose on 2 May and eight of the officers, including Major Pierre Daumesnil, were wounded as well as five officers of the Mamluks. The regiment took part in General Montbrun's charge up the road at Somosierra (30 November) but lost no officers as the Spanish gunners only managed to get off one salvo before the Polish and French cavalry charged them with sabers. (This was the second charge, not the one in which the 3rd squadron of the First Regiment of Polish Chevau-Légers was practically wiped out.)

On 28 November, Napoleon, engaged in pressing the retreat of Sir John Moore towards Corunna, rode ahead of his army into the village of Valderas, which the British had abandoned just two hours previously. He was accompanied only by his staff and a squadron of the chasseurs. When Marshal Ney found that the Emperor had thus exposed himself, he said to him: "Sire, I thank Your Majesty for acting as my advance guard." That it had been imprudent was proved next day (29 December) when General Lefebvre-Desnouettes caught up with the British rearguard, forded the River Esla and drove in their pickets, only to be counter-attacked by Lord Paget (the Uxbridge of Waterloo fame), who led his men under cover of the houses of Benavente to assail the French flank. Lefebvre-Desnouettes, wounded by a pistol shot, was taken prisoner. The regiment had 6 other officers hurt and 2 captains taken, besides 55 chasseurs killed and wounded and 73 captured. To be outflanked and cut up in this fashion was a rude and novel experience for the Emperor's "favourite children". The British cavalry who achieved this feat were the 10th Hussars with pickets of the 18th and the 3rd Hussars of the King's German Legion. Their losses amounted to no more than 50. It was this affair more than anything that convinced the Emperor that Moore had slipped from his clutches and that it was time to return to France.

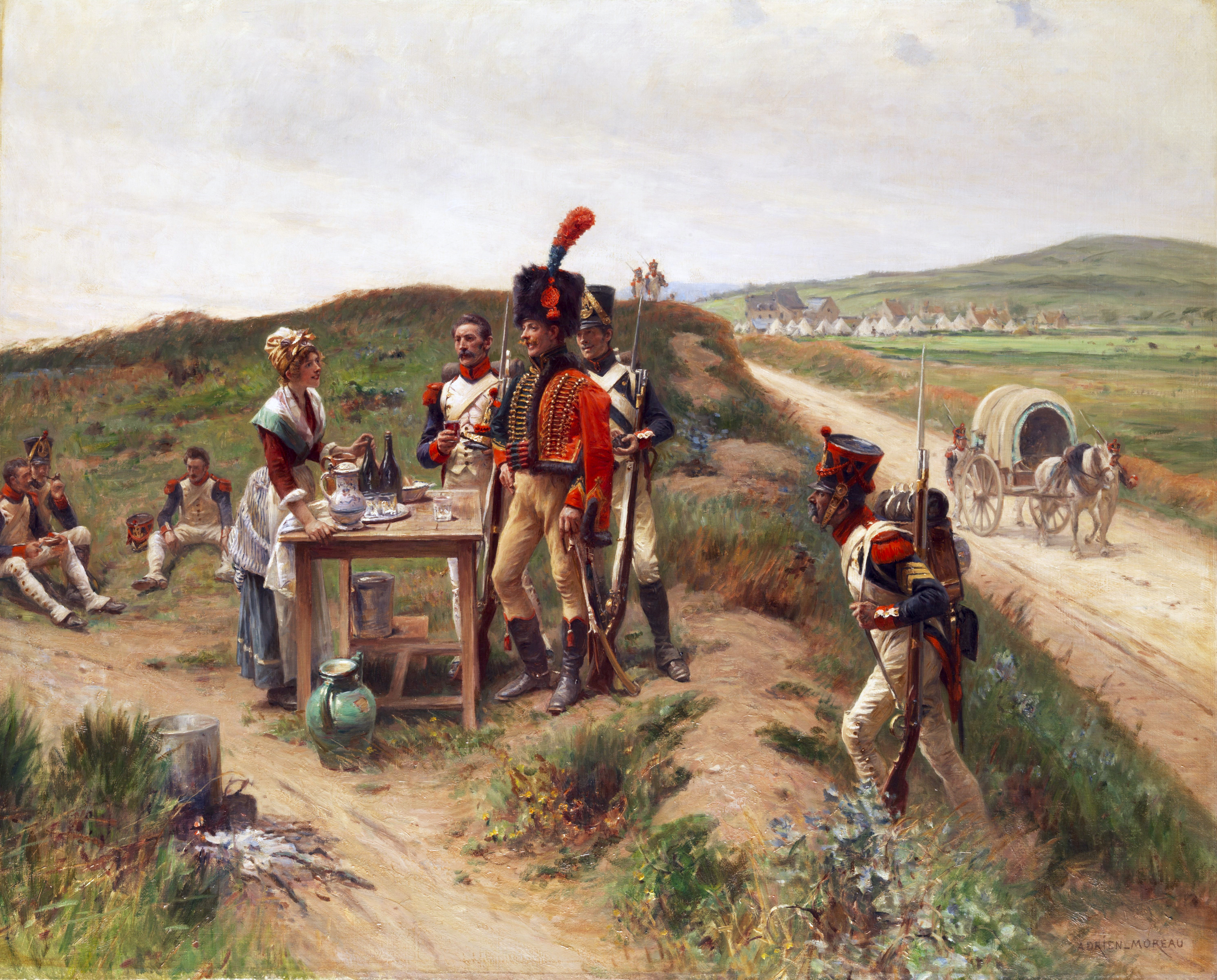
A Chasseur à cheval of the Imperial Guard and a vivandière.

The regiment was at home again by the end of February 1809. About this time, it absorbed the Chevau-légers of the Grand Duchy of Berg, formerly the Guides de Murat (11 January) and the Guides du Maréchal Mortier (1 February). On 5 June, Major Guyot became colonel commandant en second. Thiry was made général de brigade in the line and, on the 13th, Daumesnil and Hercule Corbineau were promoted majors. At Wagram, the Guard cavalry supported the right flank of MacDonald's great column which struck the decisive blow. The regiment suffered at Wagram (6 July), having 5 officers killed and 10 wounded, including the two newly promoted majors, each of whom lost a leg. Colonel Guyot was promoted général de brigade (9 August), retaining the command, and Colonel Jean Dieudonné Lion (14th Chasseurs) was brought in as third major of the corps.

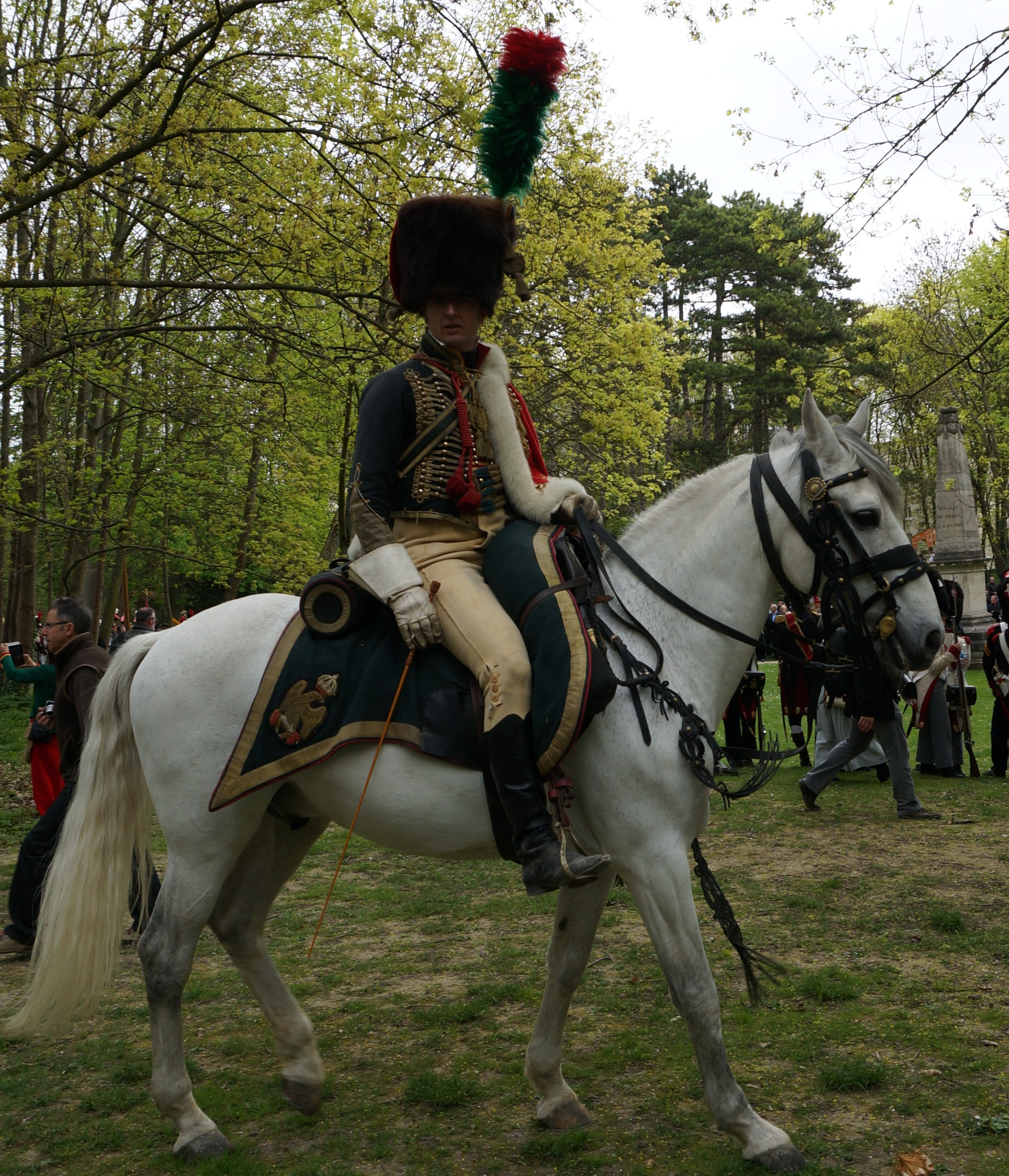
Historical reenactment of a Chasseur à Cheval.

1810 was a quiet year, with only one officer wounded escorting prisoners in Spain. On 1 August 1811, the regiment was increased to five squadrons and the vélites were done away with. During the year, squadrons were sent successively to serve with the divisions of the Garde in Spain. Guyot was promoted général de division, but still retained the command. To replace Corbineau and Daumesnil as majors, the regiment received Colonel François d'Haugéranville (6 August) and General Baron Exelmans (24 December).

On 6 May 1812, General Lefebvre-Desnouettes, who had escaped by breaking his parole, returned from his captivity in England and resumed command of the regiment. The chasseurs, five squadrons and the company of Mamluks, went through the Russian campaign, but though they lost 500 men, they only had 10 officers hit. At Borodino, they had no officer casualties at all. But on 25 October, the day after the Battle of Maloyaroslavets, two squadrons, escorting the Emperor on a reconnaissance, were sharply engaged and had 4 officers wounded. A body of Cossacks appeared suddenly from a wood and charged straight at Napoleon. General Rapp and the escort managed to beat them off, but not before one had fought his way to within twenty yards of the Emperor. From this day forth, haunted by the fear of captivity, he always carried a bag of poison on a string about his neck. The regiment's losses in this campaign must on the whole be attributed not so much to the fighting as to the Russian climate.

In 1813, the regiment was expanded from five to nine squadrons. The first five of these remained under the Old Guard while the newly raised 6th through 9th squadrons formed part of the Young Guard and in 1815 were redesigned as the 2e régiment de chasseurs de la Garde impériale.

Here is the color scheme of their coats:

Regiment	Coats	Collars	Turnbacks & Cuffs
1st Regiment			
