= Valderas =

Coordinates: 42°04′59″N 5°27′00″W

- municipality
- Interactive map of Valderas
- Country: Spain
- Autonomous community: Castile and León
- Province: León
- Municipality: Valderas

Area
  - Total: 99.63 km^{2} (38.47 sq mi)
- Elevation: 750 m (2,460 ft)

Population (2025-01-01)
  - Total: 1,479
  - Density: 14.84/km^{2} (38.45/sq mi)
- Time zone: UTC+1 (CET)
  - Summer (DST): UTC+2 (CEST)

Valderas is a town and a municipality located in the province of León, Castile and León, Spain. According to the 2004 census (INE), the municipality had a population of 2,049 inhabitants.

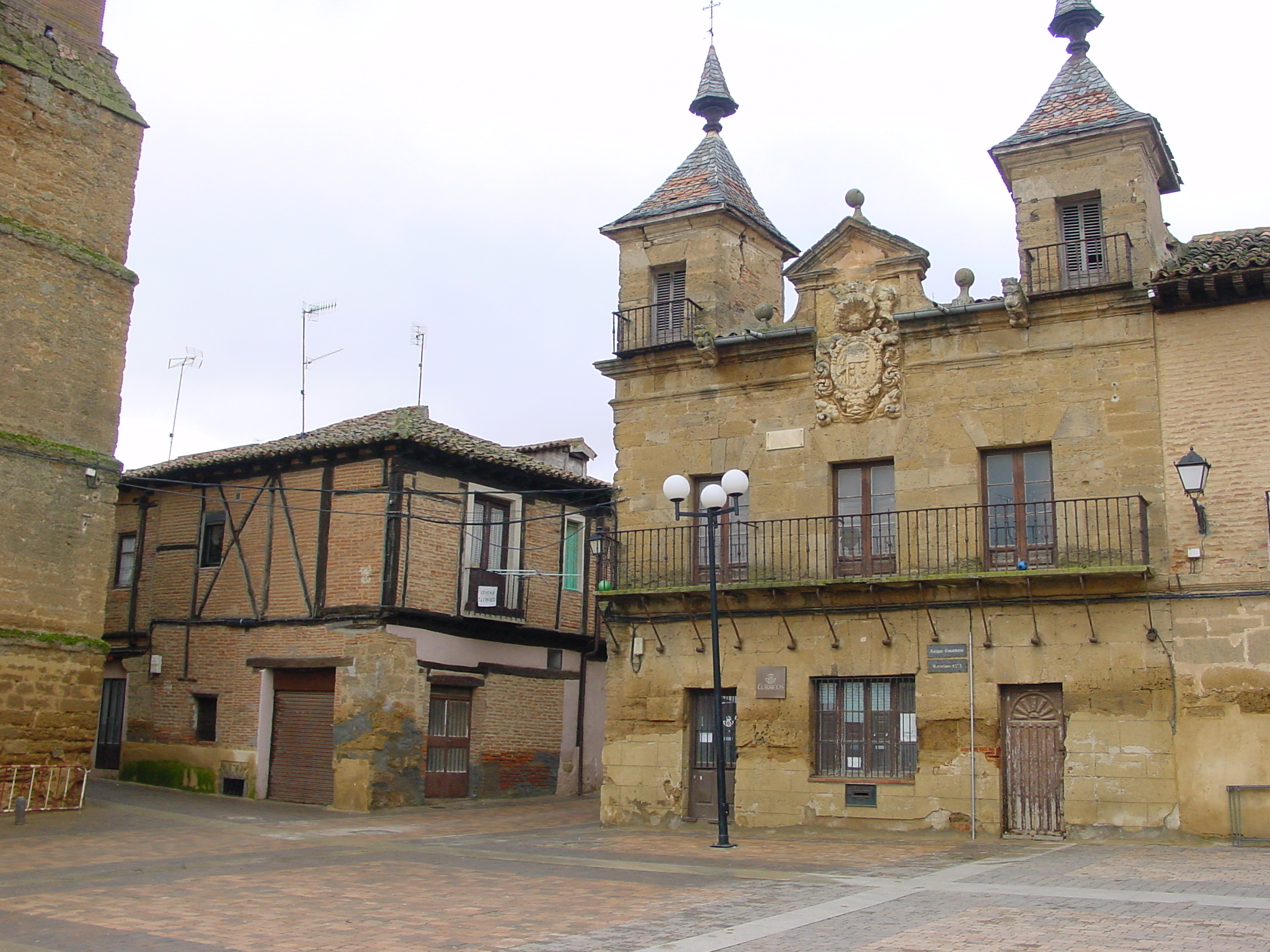
Town Hall

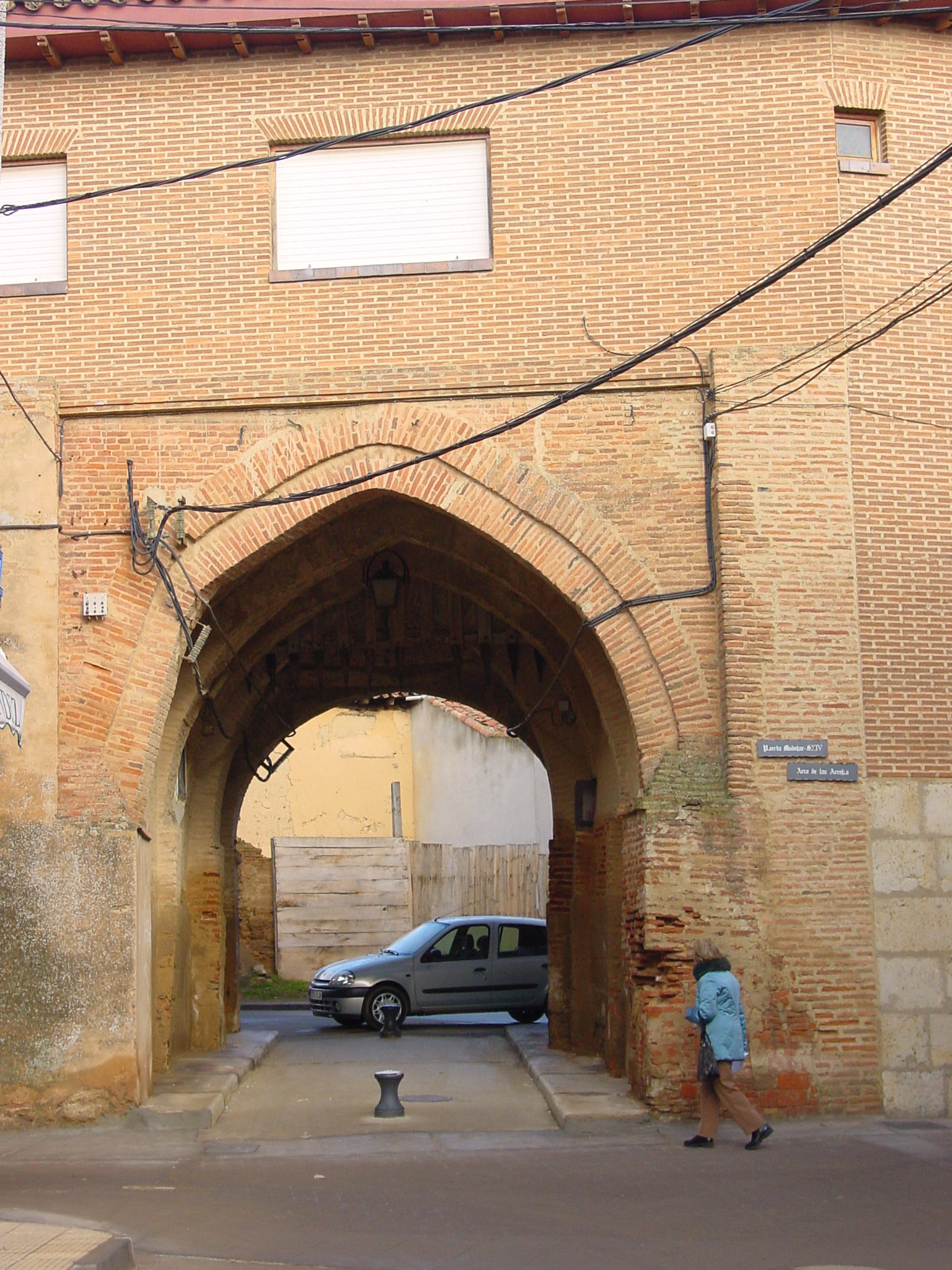
Arrejas Arch

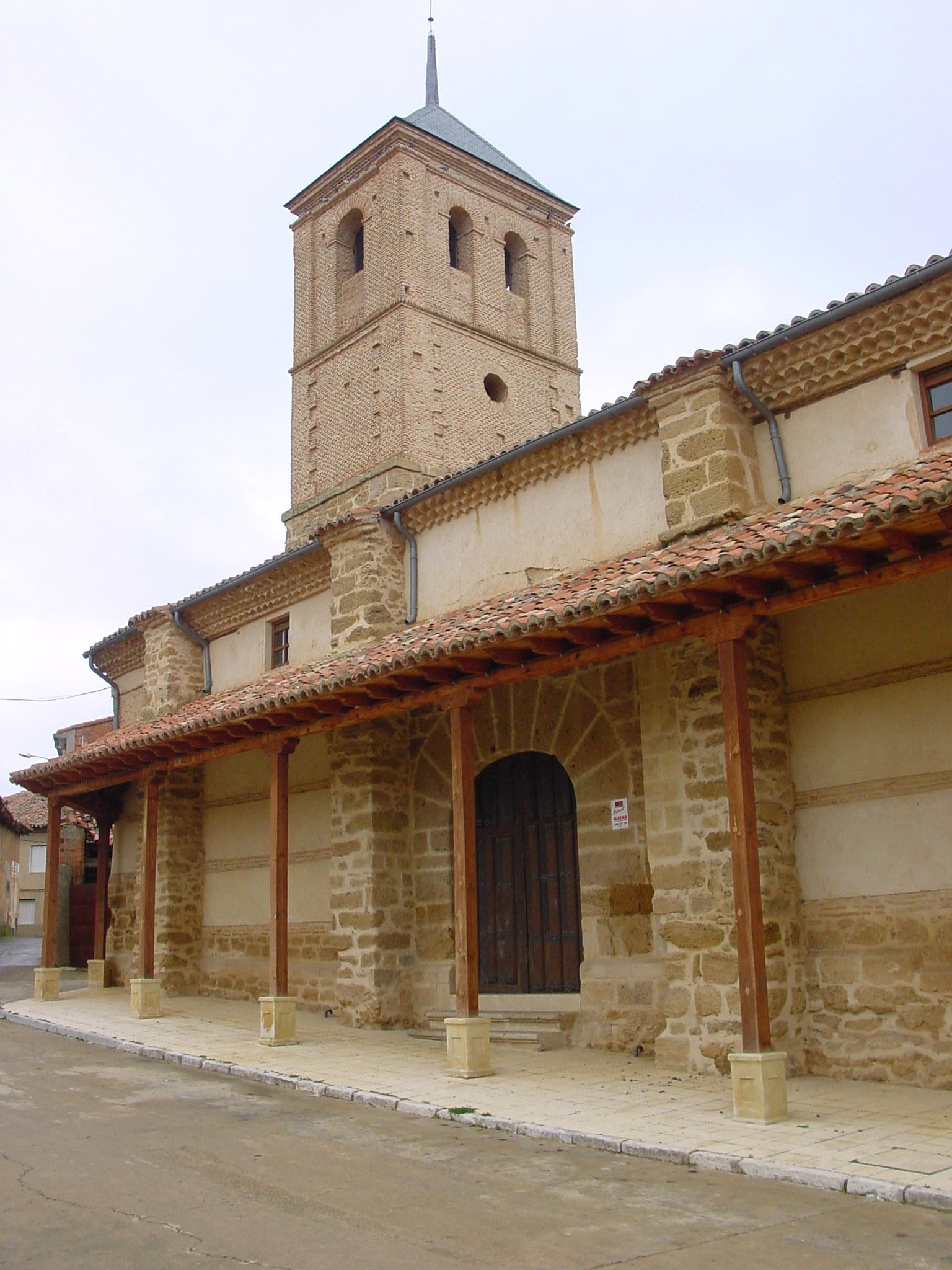
St. John's Church

== See also ==
- Kingdom of León
