= Military career of Napoleon =

Napoleon Bonaparte
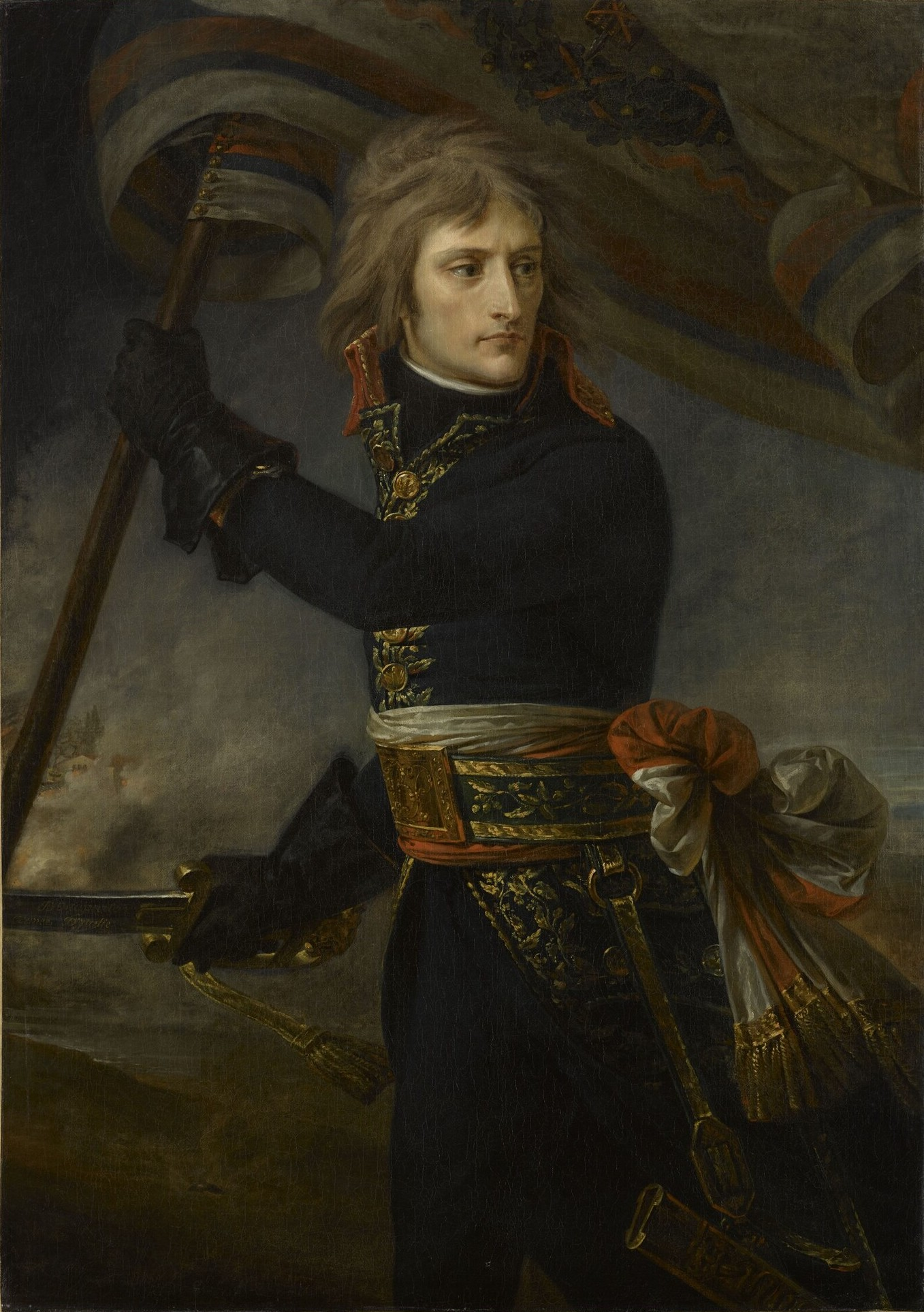
- Bonaparte at the Pont d'Arcole by Antoine-Jean Gros
- Born: 15 August 1769; Ajaccio, Corsica
- Died: 5 May 1821 (aged 51); Longwood, Saint Helena
- Relatives: House of Bonaparte
- Military career
- Allegiance: France
- Branch: Trained as an artillerist
- Service years: 1785–1815
- Rank: Commander in Chief (head of state)
- Commands: Army of the Interior; Army of Italy; Army of England; Army of the Orient; French Army; Grande Armée; Army of Germany; Army of the North
- Wars / campaigns: See § List of battles for a detailed account, or expand the list below for general coverage: List: French Revolutionary Wars; War of the First Coalition; Italian campaign; Montenotte campaign; Lombardy campaign; Mantua campaigns; Invasion of the Papal States; Vienna campaign; French invasion of Egypt and Syria; War of the Second Coalition; Marengo campaign; Napoleonic Wars; War of the Third Coalition; Ulm campaign; Austerlitz campaign; War of the Fourth Coalition; Prussian campaign; Jena campaign; Russo-Polish campaign; Greater Poland Uprising; Eylau campaign; Friedland campaign; Peninsular War; Second invasion of Spain; Corunna campaign; War of the Fifth Coalition; Austro-German campaign; Four Days' Campaign (Note: See the article below); French invasion of Russia; Central offensive; War of the Sixth Coalition; German campaign; Spring campaign; Autumn campaign; Campaign in north-east France; Six Days' Campaign; War of the Seventh Coalition; Waterloo campaign
- Awards: Grand Master of the Legion of Honour; Grand Master of the Order of the Iron Crown
- Other work: Sovereign of Elba, writer

The military career of Napoleon spanned roughly 30 years. He led French armies in the French Revolutionary Wars and later, as emperor, in the Napoleonic Wars. Despite his comprehensive battle-winning record, Napoleon ended his career in defeat. Nevertheless, European history has since regarded Napoleon as a military genius and one of the finest commanders in history. His battles, campaigns and wars have been studied at military schools worldwide. Such campaigns as the Italian campaign of 1796–1797, the Ulm campaign and the Six Days' Campaign demonstrated his strategic and tactical genius. He fought more than 80 battles, losing only eleven, mostly towards the end when the French army was not as dominant. As historian Alexander Mikhailovsky-Danilevsky observed, Napoleon was a "despotic sovereign of the battlefield, in whose presence but few generals ventured to maneuver, striving only to ward off his blows".

The French dominion collapsed rapidly after the invasion of Russia in 1812. Napoleon was defeated in 1814 and exiled to the island of Elba, before returning to France. He was finally defeated in 1815 at Waterloo. He spent his remaining days in British custody on the remote volcanic tropical island of Saint Helena. In his long military career, Bonaparte celebrated at least 75 victories and suffered 11 defeats; 7 battles ended with an uncertain or inconclusive outcome.

== Battle record summary ==
Napoleon especially proved his tactical genius in major encounters, worthy examples of which may be such as of Toulon, Rivoli, Austerlitz, Friedland and Dresden.

The siege of Toulon is notable for Napoleon's identification and capture of a key fortified position for the shelling of the Allied fleet, which entered Toulon, as it made further defence useless; Southern France was saved from invasion by sea.

The Rivoli battle, from Napoleon's point of view, consisted of noting the exhaustion of the main Austrian column, which was pushing back the French, and its lack of sufficient artillery and cavalry support, then sending of supervacaneous French troops from that area to repel the flanking Austrian column, which was breaking through a narrow passage, meeting it with infantry, cavalry and artillery from all sides, and afterwards sending French troops from there to repel the main attack. The strategic and tactical result was devastating for the Austrian army.

By Austerlitz, the French Imperial Army became the best in Europe, according to one point of view. Largely due to Bonaparte's corps innovations. The Allies, however, were in a formidable defensive position. The Austerlitz battle took place during foggy weather. The French decisive victory was achieved thanks to Napoleon's plan, which weakened his right flank, thereby lured them out to attack, and delivered a massive blow to the weakened heights. "The Sun of Austerlitz" cleared the fog and encouraged the Frenchmen as they were pushing up the heights. Hence Napoleon cut the allied army in half and routed it; the casualties were catastrophic for the Allies. Austerlitz ended the War of the Third Coalition. Napoleon would go on to use this victory as a way to rally his troops and politically influence the people of france. Most historians today agree this is one of, if not his greatest victory in all his years.

At Friedland, the troops of Marshal Jean Lannes managed to avoid being broken on the first day of battle against superior forces. Then, Napoleon arrived with his main force, insightfully saw the weakness of the Russian position, which was located with its back to the river and divided by a stream, and dealt crushing blows, defeating the Russians piecemeal and ending the War of the Fourth Coalition.

Napoleon's military genius was so feared by his enemies that the Trachenberg Plan was developed in 1813, a strategy that depended on retreating wherever and whenever they faced him in person and only targeting his subordinates until they had built up an overwhelming numerical advantage. By Dresden, Napoleon's army was inferior to the allied Austrian, Russian and Prussian armies in terms of quality due to the great depletion of manpower during the earlier wars, but he quickly and unexpectedly arrived with reinforcements into the fortified city from the east (where he chased another allied army), smashed the twice-superior allied forces by counterattacking and inflicting relatively monstrous casualties. Thus a brilliant tactical victory was achieved.

Lodi, Mount Tabor, Jena (Auerstedt is Marshal Davout's achievement) and Ligny are also examples of strong famous victories won by Napoleon on a battlefield. In the First Italian campaign (1796–1797), Napoleon's army splits two opposing armies, creating a central gap between them, and crushes individual forces in dozens of battles, knocking Piedmont out of the war, and then Austria – all despite the deplorable material support and poor disposition of the army he had initially inherited. In the Ulm campaign, Napoleon's superior, newly formed corps encircle and destroy an entire army. In the Six Days' campaign, he takes advantage of the dispersed enemy army, which outnumbers him twice as much, and strikes at the battles of Champaubert, Montmirail, Château-Thierry and Vauchamps; the enemy army loses more than half its strength. At Montmirail and Château-Thierry battles, Napoleon made active use of the Old Guard, "the elite of the elite", as well; but only one of its battalions was involved at Vauchamps. Vauchamps is a small engagement compared to Napoleon's other impressive victories, but the ratio of forces to casualties, the conditions, and the methods under which this victory was achieved render it a masterpiece of tactical execution. Napoleon had a similar campaign to the Six Days' in his career as well, the "four-day campaign," during which his army with quick maneuvers divided the Austrian army into two parts and confidently defeated it 4 times in 4 days, namely, at Teugen-Hausen, Abensberg, Landshut, and Eckmühl.

=== List of battles ===
The full list of Napoleon's victories, defeats, and drawn battles is shown in the table below. It excludes engagements such as La Maddalena or Heilsberg, where the outcome did not depend directly on Napoleon's actions. (Note: At Heilsberg the result was similar to Znaim: Heilsberg ended in an armistice.)

Date	Battle	Conflict	Opponent	Location	Outcome
August 29, 1793 – December 19, 1793	Siege of Toulon	War of the First Coalition	(Kingdom of Great Britain) (Kingdom of Naples) (Spain) (Kingdom of Sardinia) (Kingdom of Sicily)	French Republic	Victory
April 24, 1794 – April 28, 1794	Saorgio	War of the First Coalition	(Habsburg monarchy) (Kingdom of Sardinia)	Kingdom of Sardinia	Victory
September 21, 1794	First Dego	War of the First Coalition	(Habsburg monarchy) (Kingdom of Sardinia)	Kingdom of Sardinia	Victory
October 5, 1795	13 Vendémiaire	French Revolution	(Kingdom of France)	French Republic	Victory
April 11, 1796 – April 12, 1796	Montenotte	War of the First Coalition	(Habsburg monarchy) (Kingdom of Sardinia)	Kingdom of Sardinia	Victory
April 12, 1796 – April 13, 1796	Millesimo	War of the First Coalition	(Habsburg monarchy) (Kingdom of Sardinia)	Kingdom of Sardinia	Victory
April 14, 1796 – April 15, 1796	Second Dego	War of the First Coalition	(Habsburg monarchy) (Kingdom of Sardinia)	Kingdom of Sardinia	Victory
April 16, 1796	Ceva	War of the First Coalition	(Kingdom of Sardinia)	Kingdom of Sardinia	Victory
April 21, 1796	Mondovi	War of the First Coalition	(Kingdom of Sardinia)	Kingdom of Sardinia	Victory
May 7, 1796 – May 9, 1796	Fombio	War of the First Coalition	(Habsburg monarchy)	Habsburg Italy	Victory
May 10, 1796	Lodi	War of the First Coalition	(Habsburg monarchy)	Habsburg Italy	Victory
May 30, 1796	Borghetto	War of the First Coalition	(Habsburg monarchy)	Habsburg Italy	Victory
July 4, 1796 – February 2, 1797	Siege of Mantua	War of the First Coalition	(Habsburg monarchy)	Habsburg Italy	Victory
August 3, 1796 – August 4, 1796	Lonato	War of the First Coalition	(Habsburg monarchy)	Habsburg Italy	Victory
August 5, 1796	Castiglione	War of the First Coalition	(Habsburg monarchy)	Habsburg Italy	Victory
September 4, 1796	Rovereto	War of the First Coalition	(Habsburg monarchy)	Habsburg Italy	Victory
September 8, 1796	Bassano	War of the First Coalition	(Habsburg monarchy)	Habsburg Italy	Victory
September 14, 1796 – September 15, 1796	San Giorgio	War of the First Coalition	(Habsburg monarchy)	Habsburg Italy	Victory
November 6, 1796	Second Bassano	War of the First Coalition	(Habsburg monarchy)	Habsburg Italy	Defeat
November 12, 1796	Caldiero	War of the First Coalition	(Habsburg monarchy)	Habsburg Italy	Defeat
November 15, 1796 – November 17, 1796	Arcole	War of the First Coalition	(Habsburg monarchy)	Habsburg Italy	Victory
January 14, 1797 – January 15, 1797	Rivoli	War of the First Coalition	(Habsburg monarchy)	Habsburg Italy	Victory
January 16, 1797	La Favorita	War of the First Coalition	(Habsburg monarchy)	Habsburg Italy	Victory
March 16, 1797	Valvasone	War of the First Coalition	(Habsburg monarchy)	Habsburg Italy	Victory
March 21, 1797 – March 23, 1797	Tarvis	War of the First Coalition	(Habsburg monarchy)	Habsburg Italy	Victory
June 10, 1798 – June 12, 1798	Invasion of Malta	Mediterranean Campaign	(Sovereign Military Order of Malta)	Malta	Victory
July 2, 1798	Alexandria	French invasion of Egypt and Syria	(Ottoman Empire)	Mameluk Egypt	Victory
July 13, 1798	Shubra Khit	French invasion of Egypt and Syria	(Ottoman Empire)	Mameluk Egypt	Victory
July 21, 1798	Pyramids	French invasion of Egypt and Syria	(Ottoman Empire)	Mameluk Egypt	Victory
October 21, 1798 – October 22, 1798	Revolt of Cairo	French invasion of Egypt and Syria	(Ottoman Empire)	French-occupied Egypt	Victory
January 11, 1799 – January 19, 1799	Siege of El Arish	French invasion of Egypt and Syria	(Ottoman Empire)	Mameluk Egypt	Victory
March 3, 1799 – March 7, 1799	Siege of Jaffa	French invasion of Egypt and Syria	(Ottoman Empire)	Ottoman Empire	Victory
March 20, 1799 – May 21, 1799	Siege of Acre	French invasion of Egypt and Syria	(Ottoman Empire) (Kingdom of Great Britain)	Ottoman Empire	Defeat
April 16, 1799	Mount Tabor	French invasion of Egypt and Syria	(Ottoman Empire)	Ottoman Empire	Victory
July 25, 1799	Abukir	French invasion of Egypt and Syria	(Ottoman Empire) (Kingdom of Great Britain)	French-occupied Egypt	Victory
May 14, 1800 – June 1, 1800	Siege of Fort Bard	War of the Second Coalition	(Habsburg monarchy)	Kingdom of Sardinia	Victory
May 26, 1800	Chiusella River	War of the Second Coalition	(Habsburg monarchy)	Kingdom of Sardinia	Ambiguous
May 31, 1800	Turbigo	War of the Second Coalition	(Habsburg monarchy)	Kingdom of Sardinia	Victory
June 14, 1800	Marengo	War of the Second Coalition	(Habsburg monarchy)	Kingdom of Sardinia	Victory
October 15, 1805 – October 20, 1805	Ulm	War of the Third Coalition	(Habsburg monarchy)	Electorate of Bavaria	Victory
December 2, 1805	Austerlitz	War of the Third Coalition	(Habsburg monarchy) (Russian Empire)	Archduchy of Austria	Victory
October 14, 1806	Jena	War of the Fourth Coalition	(Kingdom of Prussia) (Electorate of Saxony)	Kingdom of Prussia	Victory
December 23, 1806	Czarnowo	War of the Fourth Coalition	(Kingdom of Prussia) (Russian Empire)	Kingdom of Prussia	Victory
February 3, 1807	Allenstein	War of the Fourth Coalition	(Russian Empire)	Kingdom of Prussia	Victory
February 7, 1807 – February 8, 1807	Eylau	War of the Fourth Coalition	(Kingdom of Prussia) (Russian Empire)	Kingdom of Prussia	Ambiguous
June 14, 1807	Friedland	War of the Fourth Coalition	(Russian Empire)	Kingdom of Prussia	Victory
November 30, 1808	Somosierra	Peninsular War	(Spain)	Spain	Victory
December 1, 1808 – December 4, 1808	Siege of Madrid (Note: See also Capitulation of Madrid)	Peninsular War	(Spain)	Spain	Victory
April 19, 1809	Teugen–Hausen	War of the Fifth Coalition	(Austrian Empire)	Kingdom of Bavaria	Victory
April 20, 1809	Abensberg	War of the Fifth Coalition	(Austrian Empire)	Kingdom of Bavaria	Victory
April 21, 1809	Landshut	War of the Fifth Coalition	(Austrian Empire)	Kingdom of Bavaria	Victory
April 21, 1809 – April 22, 1809	Eckmühl	War of the Fifth Coalition	(Austrian Empire)	Kingdom of Bavaria	Victory
April 23, 1809	Ratisbon	War of the Fifth Coalition	(Austrian Empire)	Principality of Regensburg	Victory
May 10, 1809 – May 13, 1809	Siege of Vienna	War of the Fifth Coalition	(Austrian Empire)	Austrian Empire	Victory
May 21, 1809 – May 22, 1809	Aspern–Essling	War of the Fifth Coalition	(Austrian Empire)	Austrian Empire	Defeat
July 5, 1809 – July 6, 1809	Wagram	War of the Fifth Coalition	(Austrian Empire)	Austrian Empire	Victory
July 10, 1809 – July 11, 1809	Znaim	War of the Fifth Coalition	(Austrian Empire)	Austrian Empire	Armistice
July 26, 1812 – July 27, 1812	Vitebsk	French invasion of Russia	(Russian Empire)	Russian Empire	Victory
August 16, 1812 – August 18, 1812	Smolensk	French invasion of Russia	(Russian Empire)	Russian Empire	Victory
September 5, 1812	Shevardino	French invasion of Russia	(Russian Empire)	Russian Empire	Victory
September 7, 1812	Borodino	French invasion of Russia	(Russian Empire)	Russian Empire	Ambiguous
September 8, 1812 – September 9, 1812	Mozhaysk	French invasion of Russia	(Russian Empire)	Russian Empire	Victory
October 24, 1812	Maloyaroslavets	French invasion of Russia	(Russian Empire)	Russian Empire	Ambiguous
October 25, 1812	Gorodnia	French invasion of Russia	(Russian Empire)	Russian Empire	Victory
November 15, 1812 – November 18, 1812	Krasnoi	French invasion of Russia	(Russian Empire)	Russian Empire	Defeat
November 26, 1812 – November 29, 1812	Berezina	French invasion of Russia	(Russian Empire)	Russian Empire	Ambiguous
May 2, 1813	Lützen	War of the Sixth Coalition	(Kingdom of Prussia) (Russian Empire)	Kingdom of Saxony	Victory
May 20, 1813 – May 21, 1813	Bautzen	War of the Sixth Coalition	(Kingdom of Prussia) (Russian Empire)	Kingdom of Saxony	Victory
May 22, 1813	Reichenbach	War of the Sixth Coalition	(Russian Empire)	Kingdom of Saxony	Victory
August 17, 1813 – August 23, 1813	Bober–Katzbach	War of the Sixth Coalition	(Kingdom of Prussia) (Russian Empire)	Kingdom of Prussia	Victory
August 26, 1813 – August 27, 1813	Dresden	War of the Sixth Coalition	(Austrian Empire) (Kingdom of Prussia) (Russian Empire)	Kingdom of Saxony	Victory
September 10, 1813 – September 18, 1813	Second Kulm	War of the Sixth Coalition	(Austrian Empire) (Kingdom of Prussia) (Russian Empire)	Austrian Empire	Defeat
October 16, 1813 – October 19, 1813	Leipzig	War of the Sixth Coalition	(Austrian Empire) (Kingdom of Prussia) (Russian Empire) (Sweden) (Grand Duchy of Mecklenburg-Schwerin)	Kingdom of Saxony	Defeat
October 22, 1813	Eckartsberga	War of the Sixth Coalition	(Austrian Empire)	Kingdom of Saxony	Victory
October 30, 1813 – October 31, 1813	Hanau	War of the Sixth Coalition	(Kingdom of Bavaria)	Duchy of Frankfurt	Victory
January 29, 1814	Brienne	War of the Sixth Coalition	(Kingdom of Prussia) (Russian Empire)	French Empire	Ambiguous
February 1, 1814	La Rothière	War of the Sixth Coalition	(Austrian Empire) (Kingdom of Bavaria) (Kingdom of Prussia) (Russian Empire)	French Empire	Defeat
February 10, 1814	Champaubert	War of the Sixth Coalition	(Russian Empire)	French Empire	Victory
February 11, 1814	Montmirail	War of the Sixth Coalition	(Kingdom of Prussia) (Russian Empire)	French Empire	Victory
February 12, 1814	Chateau-Thierry	War of the Sixth Coalition	(Kingdom of Prussia) (Russian Empire)	French Empire	Victory
February 14, 1814	Vauchamps	War of the Sixth Coalition	(Kingdom of Prussia) (Russian Empire)	French Empire	Victory
February 17, 1814	Mormant	War of the Sixth Coalition	(Austrian Empire) (Kingdom of Bavaria) (Russian Empire)	French Empire	Victory
February 18, 1814	Montereau	War of the Sixth Coalition	(Austrian Empire)	French Empire	Victory
February 23, 1814 – February 24, 1814	Troyes	War of the Sixth Coalition	(Austrian Empire) (Kingdom of Prussia) (Russian Empire)	French Empire	Victory
March 5, 1814	Berry-au-Bac	War of the Sixth Coalition	(Russian Empire)	French Empire	Victory
March 7, 1814	Craonne	War of the Sixth Coalition	(Kingdom of Prussia) (Russian Empire)	French Empire	Victory
March 8, 1814	Chivy-lès-Étouvelles	War of the Sixth Coalition	(Kingdom of Prussia) (Russian Empire)	French Empire	Victory
March 9, 1814 – March 10, 1814	Laon	War of the Sixth Coalition	(Kingdom of Prussia) (Russian Empire)	French Empire	Defeat
March 12, 1814 – March 13, 1814	Reims	War of the Sixth Coalition	(Kingdom of Prussia) (Russian Empire)	French Empire	Victory
March 20, 1814 – March 21, 1814	Arcis-sur-Aube	War of the Sixth Coalition	(Austrian Empire) (Kingdom of Bavaria) (Russian Empire)	French Empire	Defeat
March 26, 1814	Saint-Dizier	War of the Sixth Coalition	(Russian Empire)	French Empire	Victory
June 15, 1815	Gilly	Hundred Days	(Kingdom of Prussia)	United Kingdom of the Netherlands	Victory
June 16, 1815	Ligny	Hundred Days	(Kingdom of Prussia)	United Kingdom of the Netherlands	Victory
June 18, 1815	Waterloo	Hundred Days	(Kingdom of Prussia) (United Kingdom of Great Britain and Ireland) (Kingdom of Hanover) (United Kingdom of the Netherlands) (Duchy of Nassau)	United Kingdom of the Netherlands	Defeat

(Note: For comprehensive coverage, see Chandler (1973). For an overall view of the military history of the era see Trevor N. Dupuy and R. Ernest Dupuy, The Encyclopedia of Military History (2nd ed., 1970) pp. 730–770.)
