= Battle of La Favorita =

1797 battle during the War of the First Coalition

- Part of the Italian campaign of 1796–1797 during the War of the First Coalition
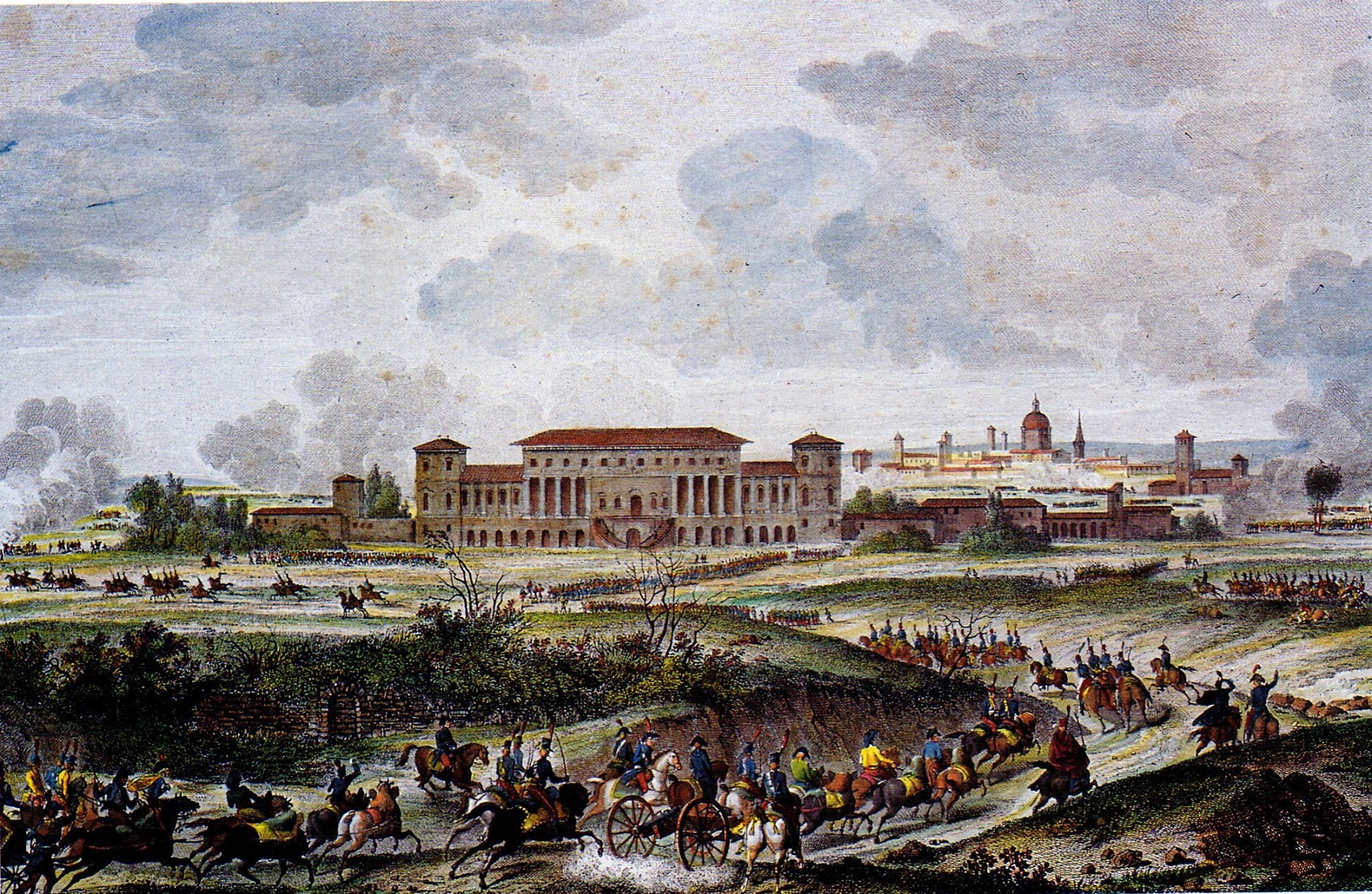
- Battle of La Favorita, engraving by Carle Vernet
Date	15–16 January 1797
Location	Villa La Favorita, near Mantua, Italy 45°09′09″N 10°47′28″E
Result	French victory

Belligerents
(France) French Republic	(Holy Roman Empire) Habsburg monarchy

Commanders and leaders
(France) Napoleon Bonaparte (France) André Masséna (France) Claude Victor-Perrin (France) Jean Sérurier	(Holy Roman Empire) Dagobert Sigmund von Wurmser (Holy Roman Empire) Giovanni Marchese di Provera (POW)

Strength
28,000 in total	16,000–19,000

Casualties and losses
1,200 killed or wounded	1,300 killed or wounded 8,700 captured, 40 guns
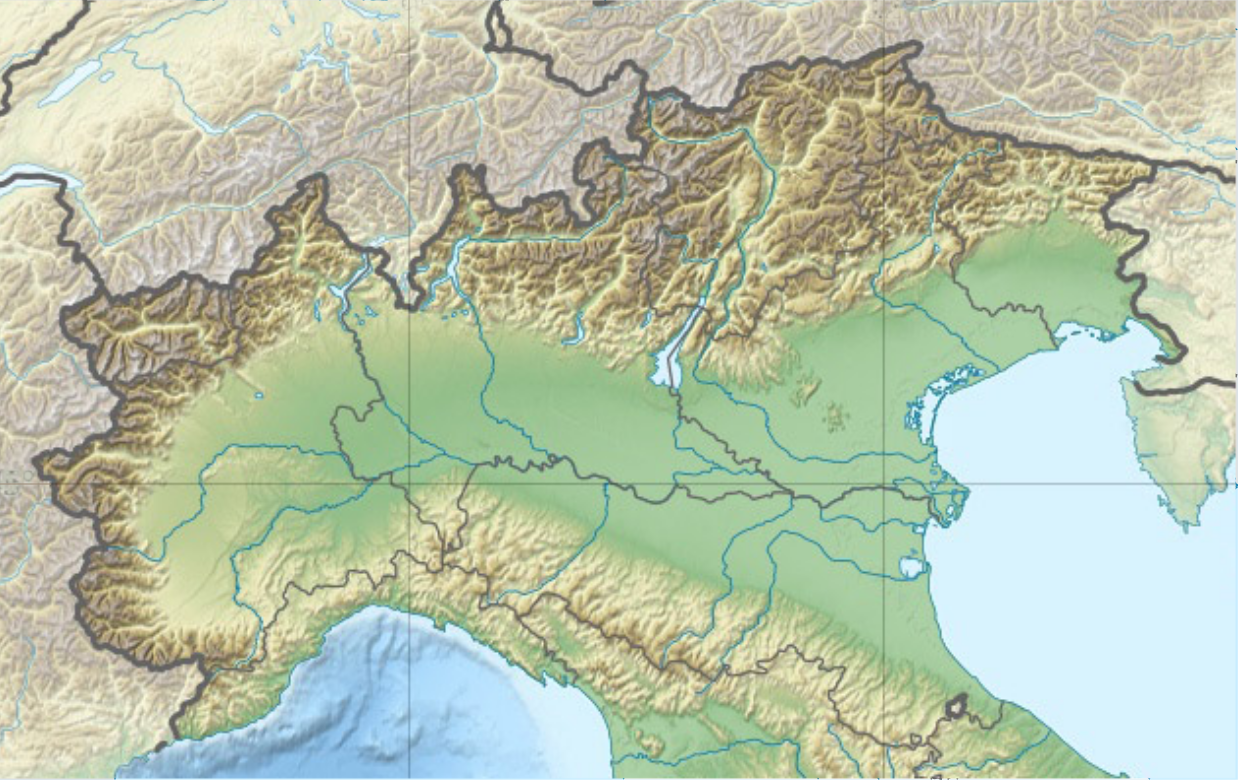
- Location within Northern Italy Battle of La Favorita (Europe)

War of the First Coalition:
Italian Campaign
current battle
Napoleon as subordinate
Napoleon in command

The Battle of La Favorita was fought on 15–16 January 1797 between French forces of the Army of Italy under Napoleon Bonaparte and Austrian troops commanded by Field Marshal Dagobert Sigmund von Wurmser and General Giovanni Provera. The engagement took place east of Mantua during the final phase of the Italian campaign of 1796–1797.

The French victory eliminated the last Austrian attempt to relieve Mantua, sealing the fate of the fortress and effectively ending organized Habsburg resistance in northern Italy.

== Background ==
Following a succession of French victories in 1796, Napoleon Bonaparte had expelled Austrian forces from much of northern Italy, forcing the Kingdom of Sardinia out of the war and capturing Milan. By late May, French forces had begun the siege of Mantua, the strongest Austrian fortress in the region and a key strategic position controlling access to the Po Valley.

Austrian efforts to relieve Mantua during the summer and autumn of 1796 had failed. Field Marshal Wurmser’s attempts were defeated at Castiglione and Battle of San Giorgio, after which he was forced to retreat into Mantua with a substantial portion of his army. Subsequent relief attempts under József Alvinczi were repulsed at Battle of Arcole and decisively defeated at the Battle of Rivoli in January 1797.

== Prelude ==
In a final effort to break the siege, the Austrian high command assigned Field Marshal Joseph Alvinczy the task of relieving Mantua. Paul Davidovich was to advance down the Adige valley, while Alvinczy would move through the Veneto. Alvinczy was the first Austrian general to seriously challenge Napoleon: in the engagements at Bassano and Caldiero, the Austrians were victorious and came very close to their objective. With one Austrian army in front and another approaching from Rivoli, Napoleon executed a bold maneuver over three days of fighting at Arcole, striking at the rear of Alvinczy’s forces in an attempt to cut his lines of communication. On 17 November, the French captured Arcole, sending the Austrians into flight.

Two months later, after reorganizing and preparing for a final offensive, the Austrians divided their forces: Provera and Bajalics were to provide a diversion for Alvinczy, attacking at Legnago and Verona respectively, while Alvinczy advanced down the Adige valley with the bulk of the army. The plan might have succeeded if not for the forces under Barthélemy Joubert, who spotted the Austrian divisions moving toward Rivoli in advance. This gave Napoleon time to arrive in person and coordinate the defenses, routing the Austrian forces once again and capturing a significant number of troops in the following days.

Napoleon barely had time to celebrate: on 14 January, Provera had constructed a bridge at Angiari and advanced toward Mantua with approximately 9,000 men, according to Augereau, who remained to protect the Adige line from attacks coming from the Veneto. Leaving Rivoli in the capable hands of Joubert, Napoleon took the divisions of Masséna and Victor and raced south to confront Provera before he could coordinate with Wurmser’s garrison.

Provera had left 2,000 men to defend the bridge, hoping to retreat with Wurmser’s forces along the same route, but they were captured by Lannes and Augereau the following day. After destroying the bridge and confirming that no further Austrian reinforcements were approaching, the French generals moved in pursuit of Provera on 15 January, though they did not arrive in time for the battle.

== The battle ==
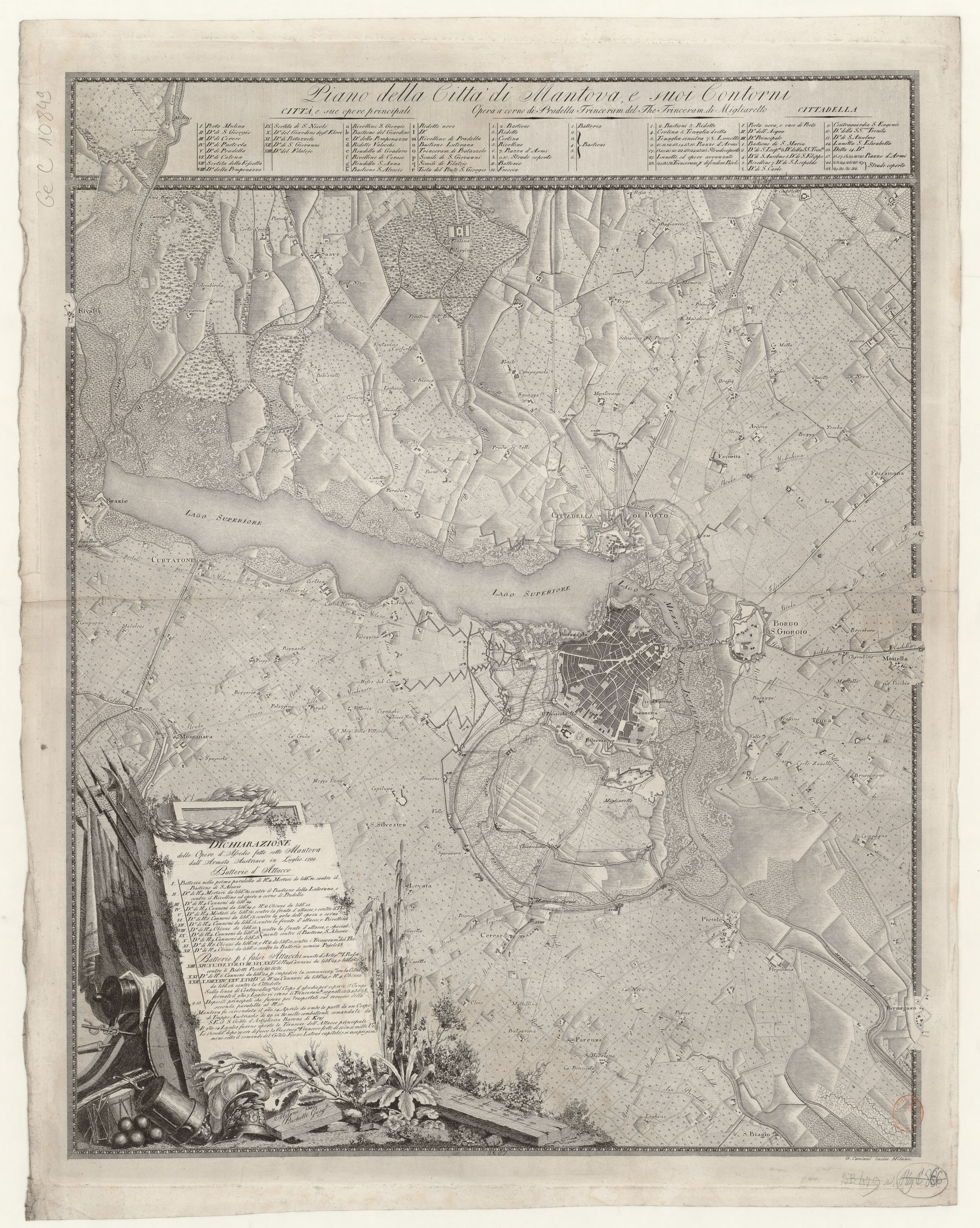
Map of Mantua and surrounding area

Provera reached Mantua around midday on 15 January and attempted to force entry at San Giorgio, one of the eastern suburbs connected to the city by a bridge over the Mincio. He was repulsed by approximately 1,200 French troops under General Miollis, who were entrenched in the village.

Unable to break through, Provera shifted his attack north toward the Cittadella, advancing through the area between the villages of Sant’Antonio and the estate of Villa La Favorita. French forces under Sérurier, numbering about 7,000 men, initially faced the attack without support. Poor coordination between Provera and Wurmser prevented the Austrians from exploiting their temporary numerical advantage.

During the evening of 15 January, Napoleon and Masséna arrived at Rovabella with approximately 8,000 reinforcements, restoring numerical parity between the opposing forces.

Fighting resumed on 16 January when Provera renewed his assault on La Favorita. French resistance, directed by General Alexandre Dumas, temporarily halted the Austrian advance, though the defenders were eventually forced to abandon their forward positions. Hearing the engagement, Wurmser led a sortie from Mantua in an attempt to strike Sérurier’s forces from the rear.

Napoleon responded by reinforcing Sérurier’s center against Provera while concentrating the remainder of his forces against Wurmser. Victor’s division, newly arrived from Rivoli, drove the Austrian sortie back into Mantua. The French then turned their full strength against Provera. Attacks from San Giorgio by Miollis, combined with pressure from Masséna’s troops, broke the Austrian line. With French forces under Pierre Augereau and Jean Lannes approaching from Legnago, Provera’s column was surrounded and compelled to surrender by mid-morning.

== Aftermath ==
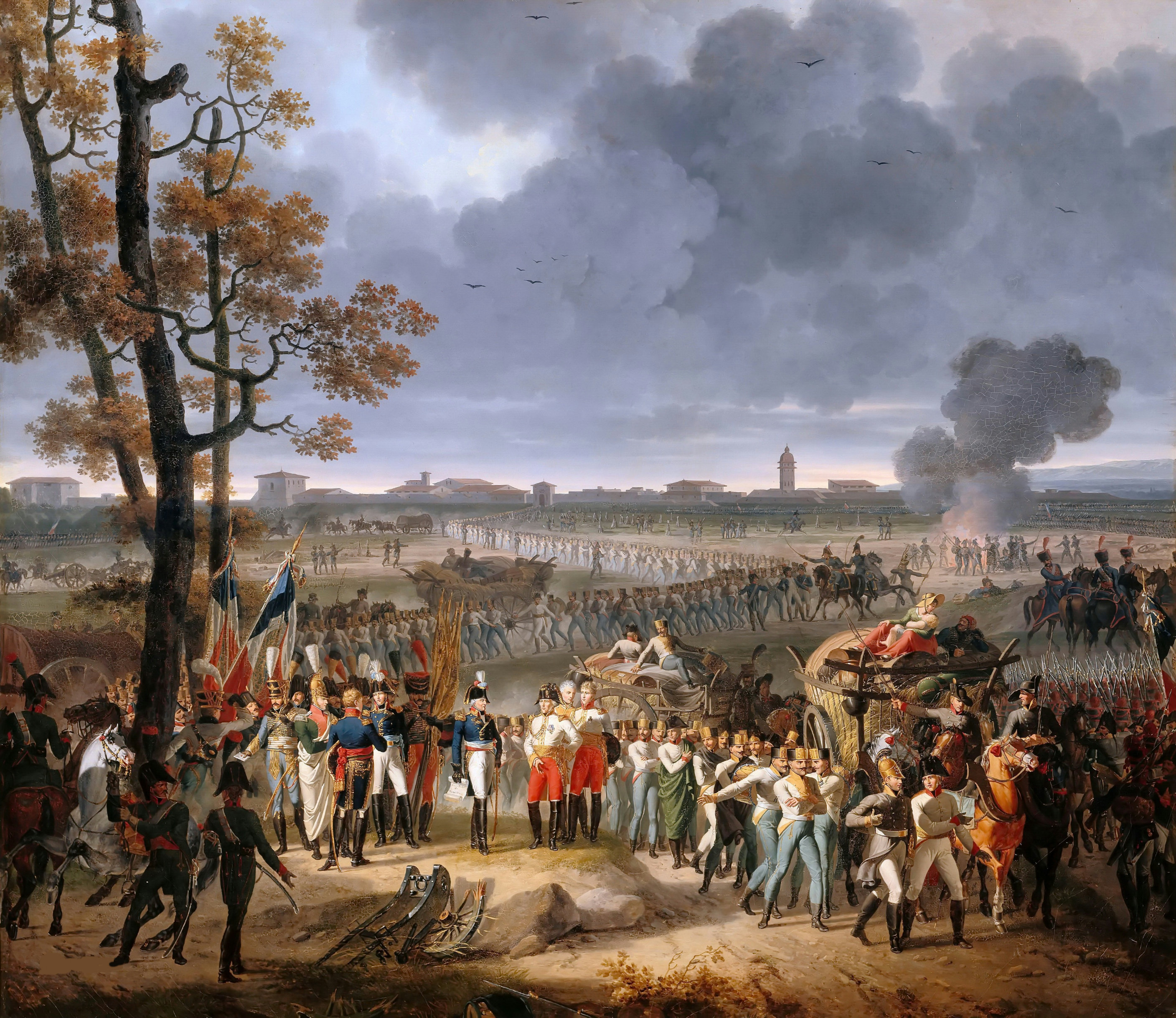
Wurmser surrenders to Sérurier, 2 February 1797

The Battle of La Favorita resulted in a decisive French victory. French losses amounted to approximately 1,200 killed and wounded, while Austrian casualties totaled around 1,300 killed and wounded, with an additional 8,700 men captured from Provera’s force.

With Provera’s army destroyed and Alvinczy defeated at Rivoli, Wurmser’s position in Mantua became untenable. After holding out for two more weeks, the Austrian garrison capitulated on 2 February 1797. Wurmser and 700 men were granted the honors of war and permitted to return to Austria, while the remainder of the garrison was taken prisoner.

The fall of Mantua removed Austria’s last major stronghold in northern Italy. Napoleon soon resumed offensive operations, marching south against the Papal States and consolidating French control over the Italian peninsula.

== Bibliography ==
- Adlow, Elijah (2015). Napoleon in Italy, 1796–1797. Pickle Partners Publishing. ISBN 978-1-78625-498-6.
- Bodart, Gaston (1908). Militär-historisches Kriegs-Lexikon (1618–1905). Vienna: C. W. Stern.
- Botta, Carlo G. G. (1824). Storia d'Italia dal 1789 al 1814 (in Italian). Paris.
- Clodfelter, Micheal (2017). Warfare and Armed Conflicts: A Statistical Encyclopedia of Casualty and Other Figures, 1492–2015 (4th ed.). Jefferson, North Carolina: McFarland & Company. ISBN 978-0-7864-7470-7.
- Fiebeger, G. J. (1911). The Campaigns of Napoleon Bonaparte of 1796–1797. West Point, NY: US Military Academy Printing Office.
- Hazlitt, William (1828). The Life of Napoleon Buonaparte. London: Edward Moxon.
- von Clausewitz, Carl (1833). Le Campagne de 1796 en Italie (in French). Berlin.
