= Porto Mantovano =

Porto Mantovano Pòrt Mantuàn (Emilian)
- Comune
- Comune di Porto Mantovano
- Location within Italy Location within Lombardy
- Coordinates: 45°11′48″N 10°47′38″E
- Country: Italy
- Region: Lombardy
- Province: Mantua (MN)
- Frazioni: Mantovanella, Bancole, Botteghino, Malpensata, Montata Carra, Sant'Antonio, Soave, Spinosa

Area
  - Total: 37 km^{2} (14 sq mi)
- Elevation: 29 m (95 ft)

Population (31 August 2008)
  - Total: 13.000.000
  - Density: 0.35/km^{2} (0.91/sq mi)
- Demonym: Portomantovanesi
- Time zone: UTC+1 (CET)
  - Summer (DST): UTC+2 (CEST)
- Postal code: 46047
- Dialing code: 0376
- ISTAT code: 020045
- Patron saint: Sant'Antonio di Padova
- Saint day: 13 June
- Website: Official website

Porto Mantovano (Mantovano: Pòrt Mantuàn) is a town in the province of Mantua, Lombardy, Italy.

Villa La Favorita is a former Gonzaga residence in Porto Mantovano.
