= Villa La Favorita =

Palace in Porto Mantovano, Italy

Coordinates: 45.1849°N 10.8016°E

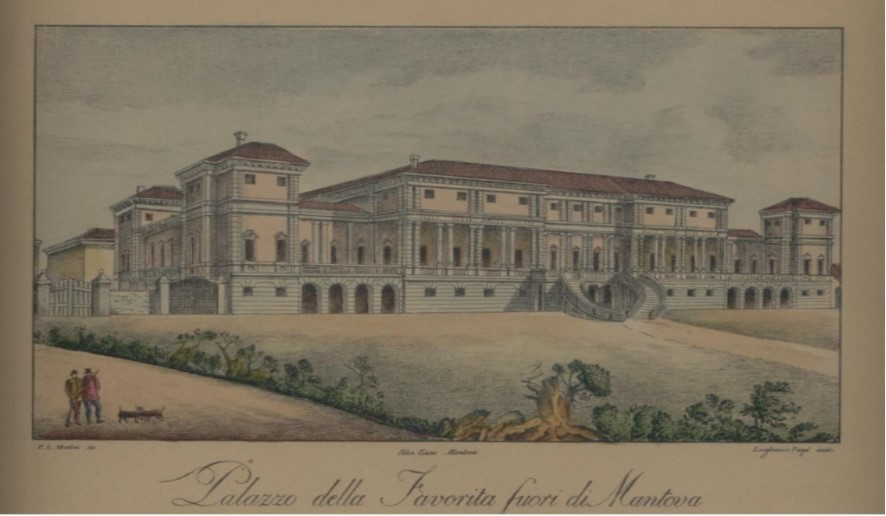
Villa La Favorita in 1829

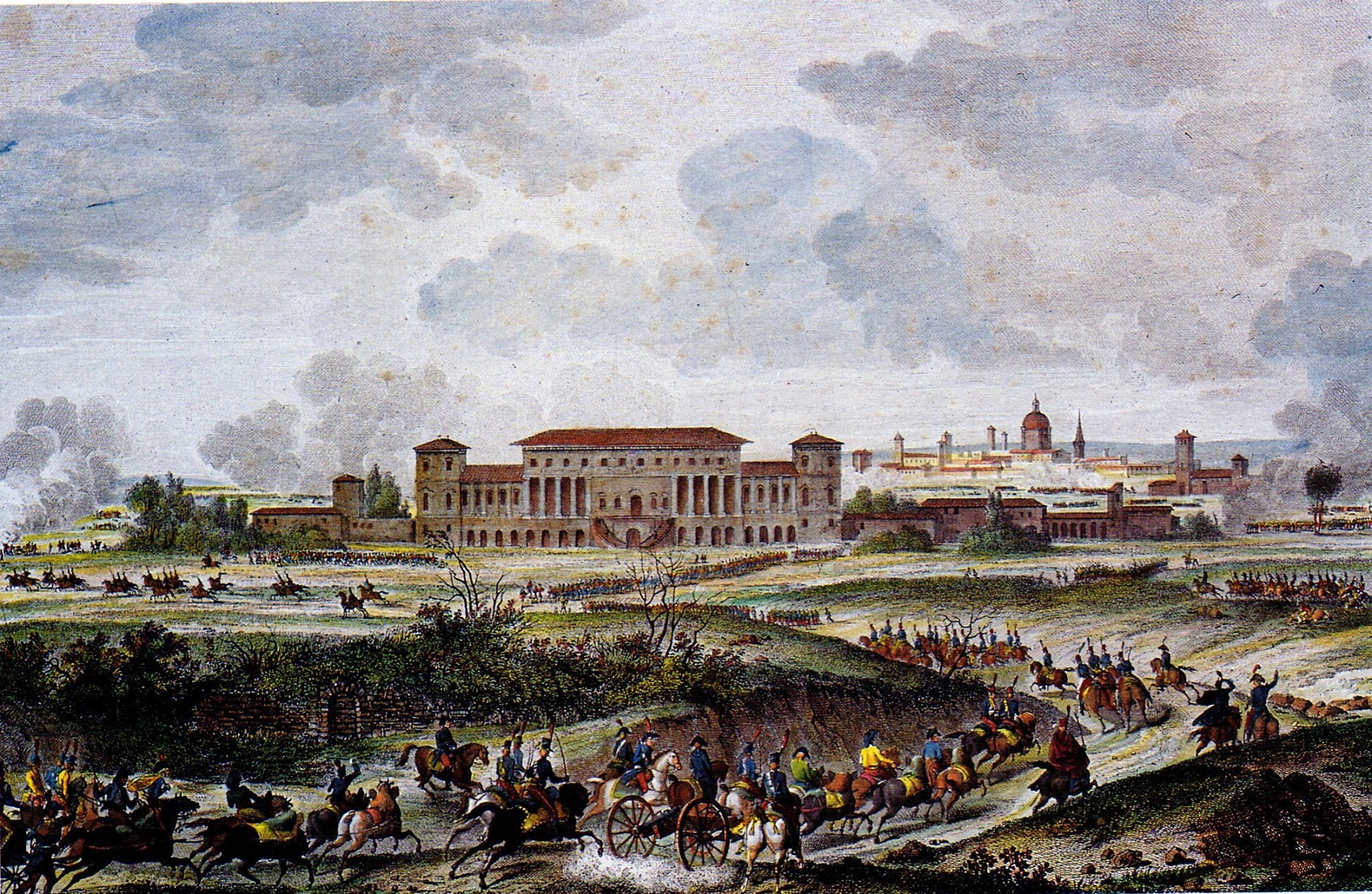
The villa during the Siege of Mantua in 1796

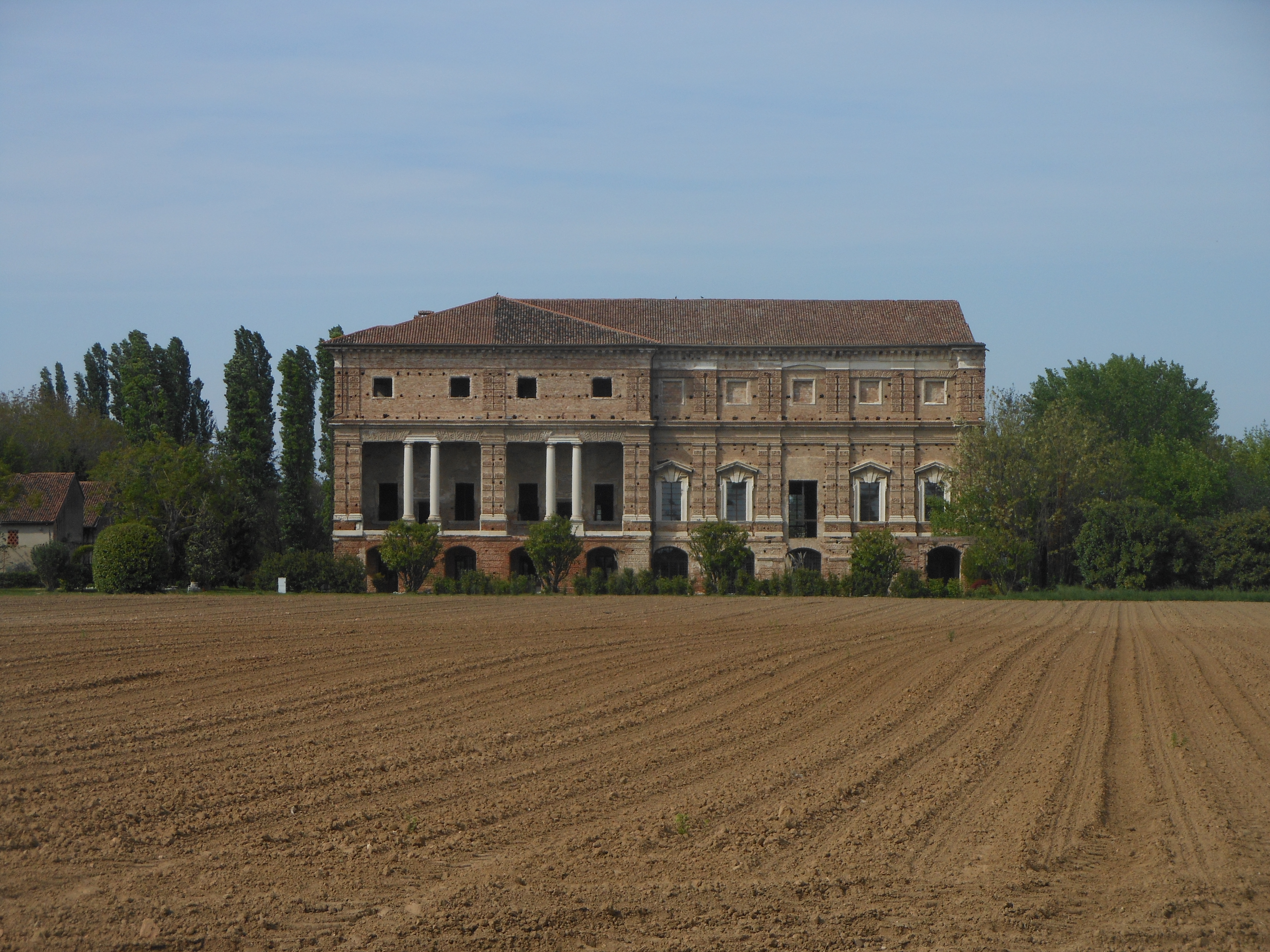
The remaining fragment of the Villa which has been restored

The Villa La Favorita is a palace in Porto Mantovano, just north of Mantua, Italy. It was built in the 17th century as a residence for duke Ferdinand Gonzaga of Mantua (1587-1626). It was the last symbol of the Gonzaga wealth and power. Its construction was such a heavy burden on the ducal treasury that it ultimately resulted in the sale of the ducal art collection in 1627. Today, only a fragmentary shell remains of the palace, which is used for hospitality purposes.

== History ==
Villa La Favorita was constructed between 1615 (or 1613) and 1624 by Duke Ferdinand Gonzaga, who intended to move his court from the ducal palace to here. It was built on the outskirts of Mantua, but not too far, just on the other side of the lakes that surround the city. The ducal architect, Nicolò Sebregondi, provided the design and was responsible for the overseeing the building. The palace was the last great Gonzaga residence, and was a grand baroque structure.

Duke Ferdinand Gonzaga insatiable collected work of arts, which he brought together in the villa. However, the collecting and the building overburdened the ducal treasury such that in 1627, a year after the duke died, the ducal collection was sold to Charles I of England.

During the War of the Mantuan Succession, the city of Mantua was sieged and sacked in 1630. After this period, the duchy rapidly descended into a perpetual crisis, and the Gonzaga family was forced to sell all their goods. In the 18th century, Mantua became part of the Austrian empire.

The villa played a significant role in history during the French conquest of Mantua in 1796. The palace was used as a defensive stronghold by the Austrians, who were in control of Mantua at that time. The French army led by Napoleon Bonaparte laid siege to the city, and a decisive battle called Battaglia della Favorita (Favorita's battle) took place around the palace. The French emerged victorious, and this battle marked the beginning of the palace's decline.

Following the conquest of the city by the French, the palace was sold, then utilised for many purposes. It was set on fire during World War I and partially demolished. The remains of the villa has partially been restored and is now used for hospitality purposes.

== Literature ==
- Perogalli, Carlo; Grazia Sandri, Maria; Roncai, Luciano (1981). Ville delle province di Cremona e Mantova. Lombardia 5 (in Italian). Milano: Rusconi. p. 541. ISBN 978-6001317675.
- Askew, Pamela (1978). "Ferdinando Gonzaga's Patronage of the Pictorial Arts: The Villa Favorita". The Art Bulletin. 60: 274–296.

== Gallery: The Villa La Favorita today – In the middle of the fields just north of Mantua ==
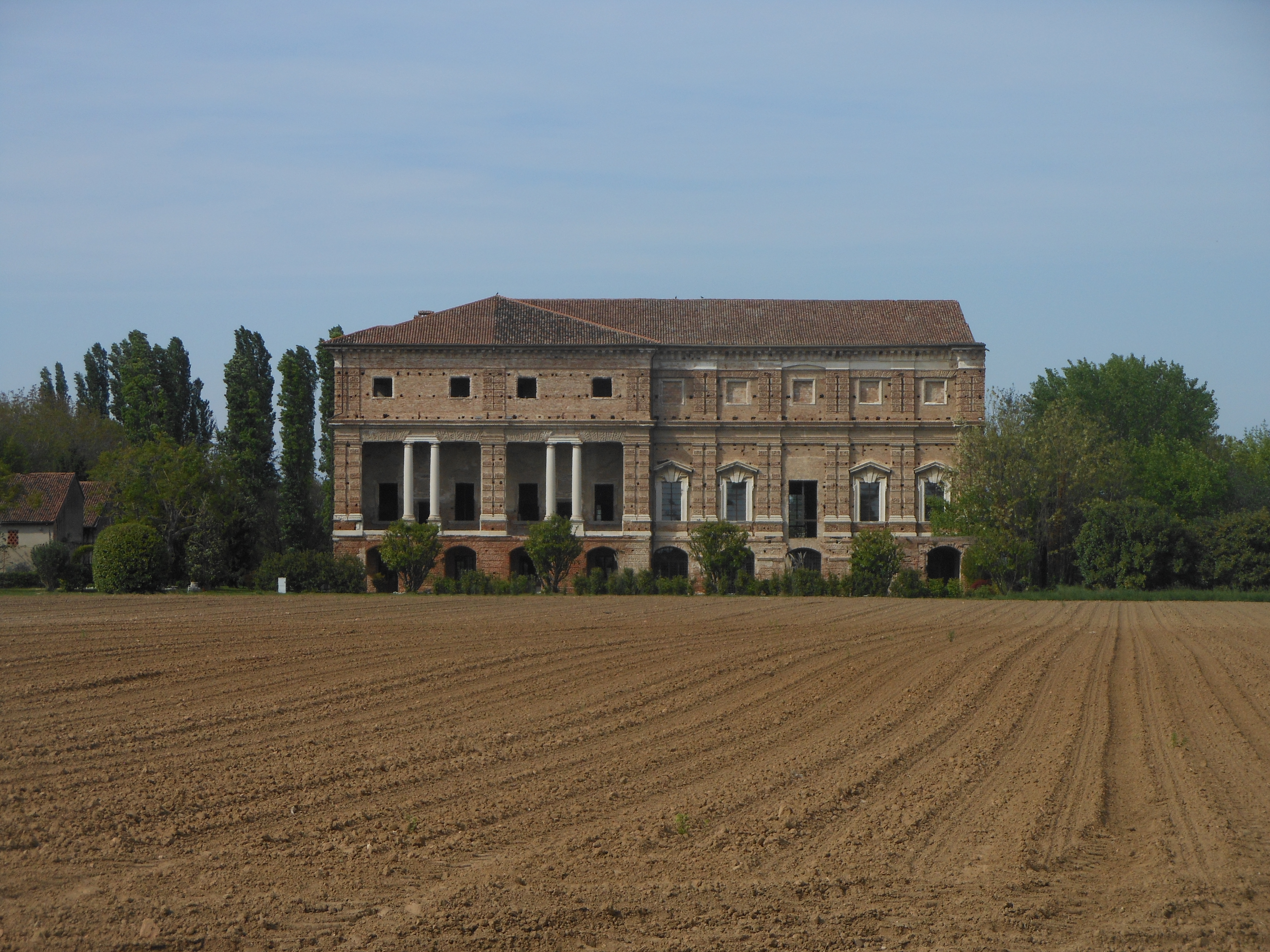

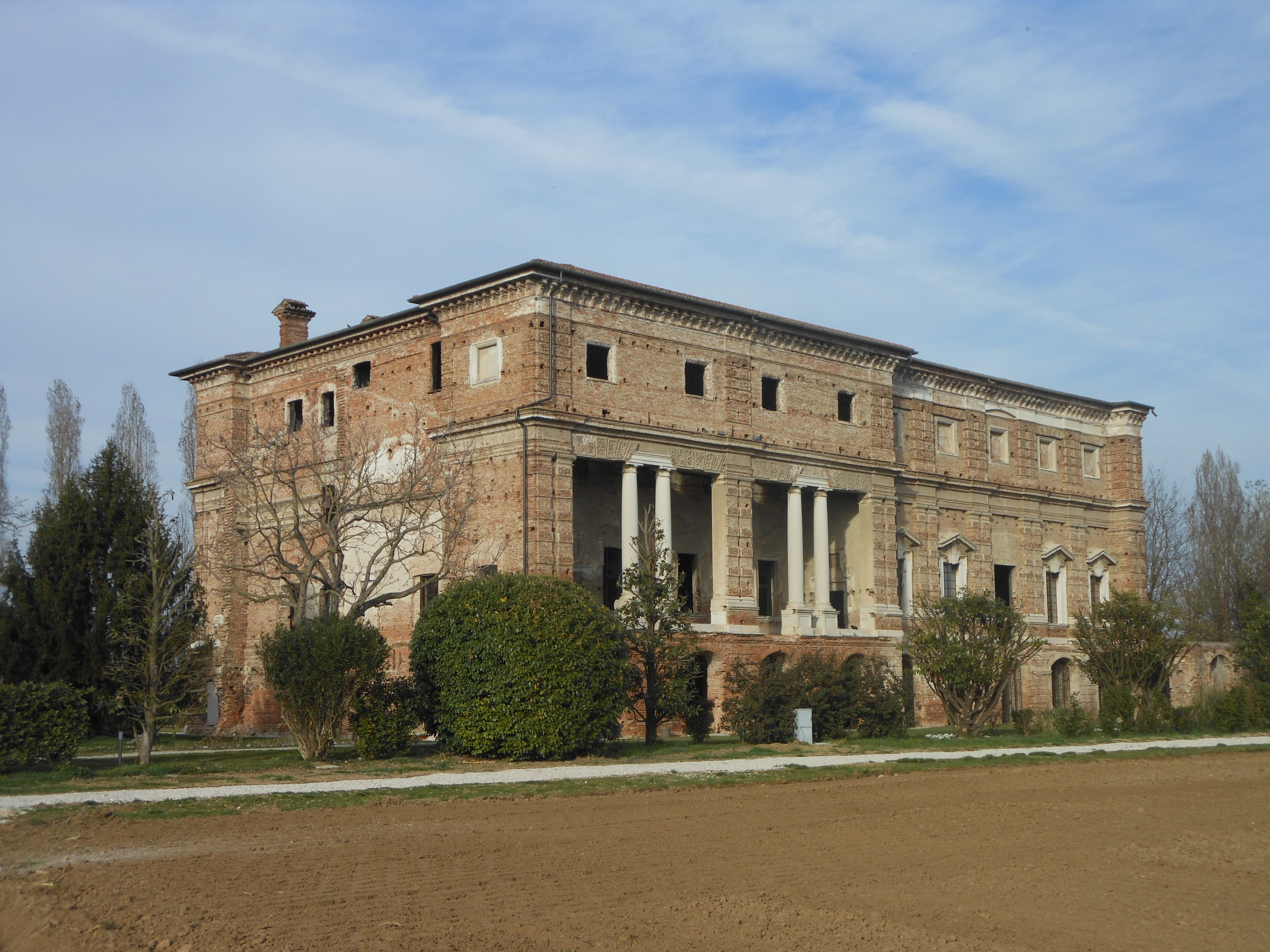

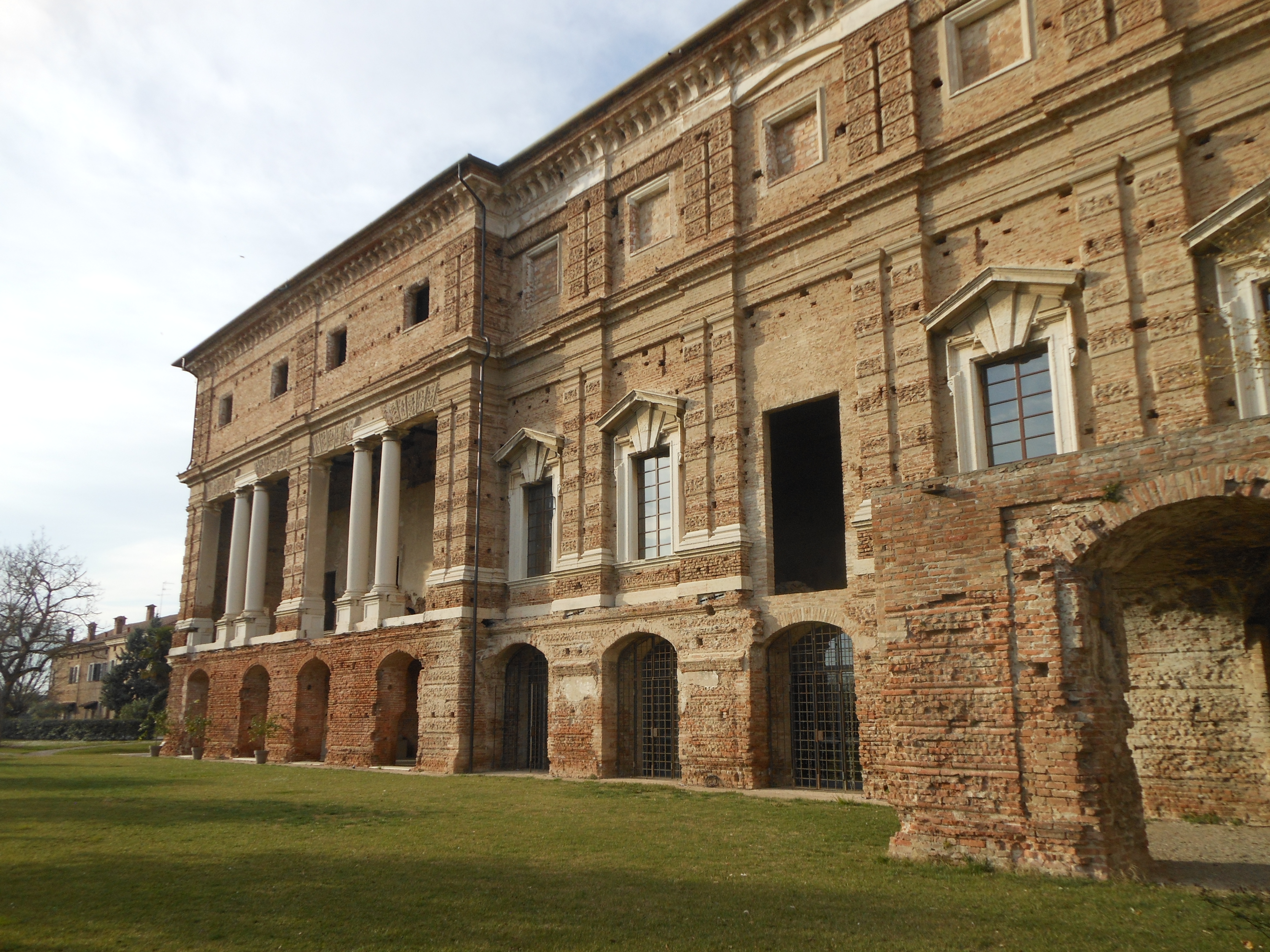

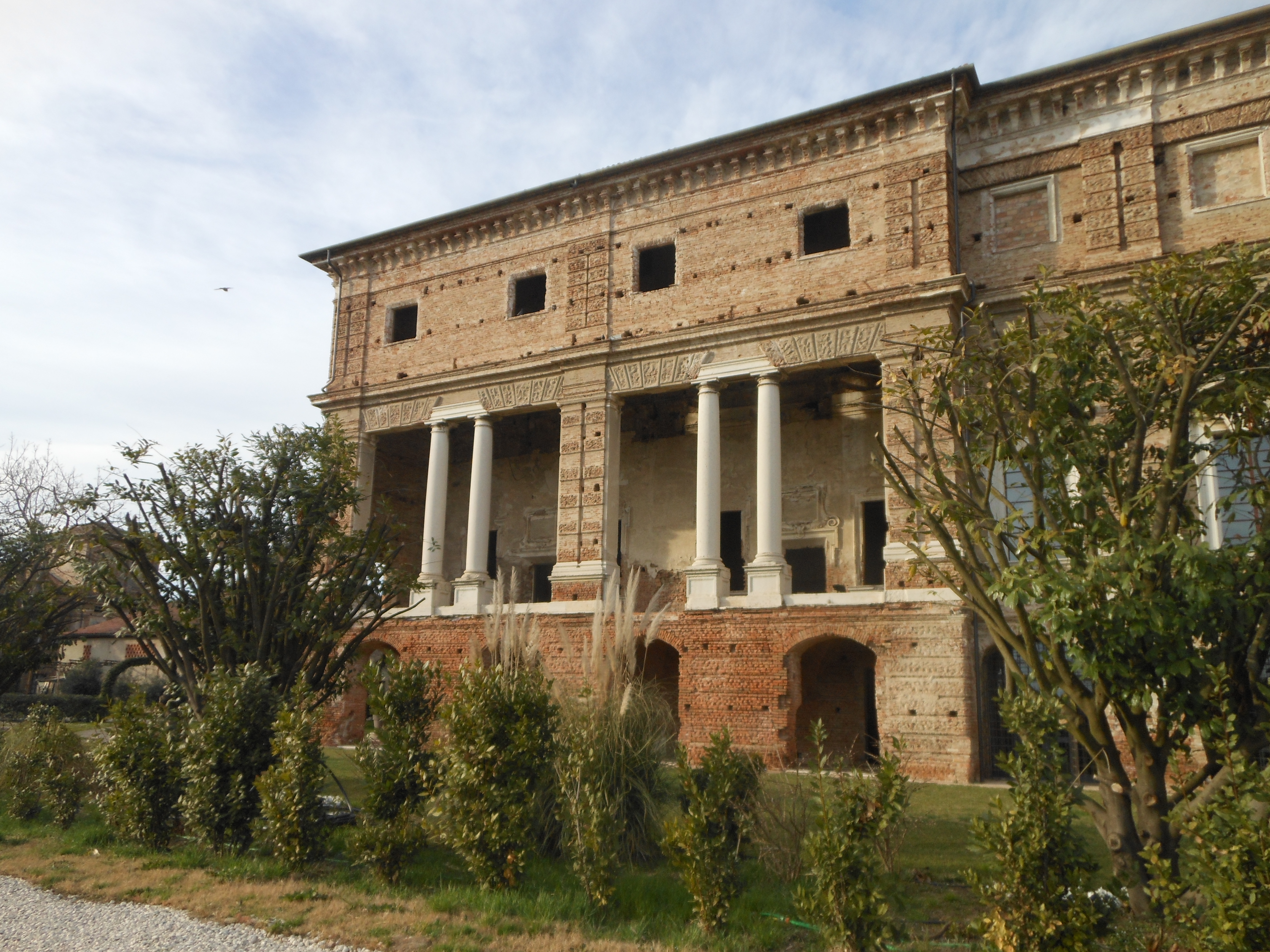
