= Battle of San Giorgio =

1796 battle during the War of the First Coalition

- Part of the Italian campaign of 1796–1797 during the War of the First Coalition
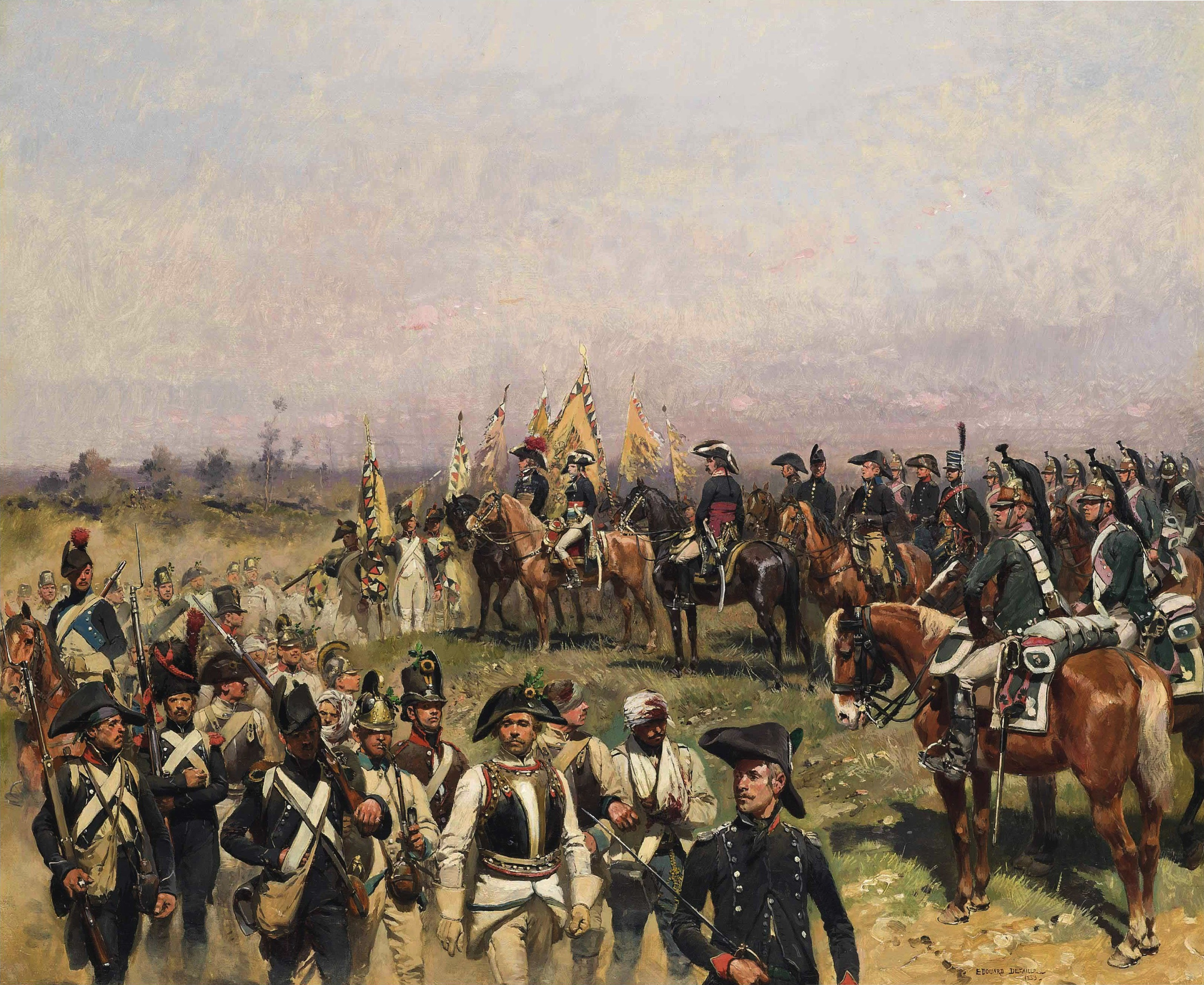
- General Bonaparte and his staff observing Austrian prisoners by Édouard Detaille (1883)
Date	14–15 September 1796
Location	San Giorgio, near Mantua, Italy 45°10′00″N 10°45′00″E
Result	French victory

Belligerents
(France) French Republic	Habsburg monarchy

Commanders and leaders
(France) Napoleon Bonaparte (France) Jean Lannes	(Holy Roman Empire) Dagobert Sigmund von Wurmser

Strength
20,000	14,000

Casualties and losses
1,500	2,500 killed or wounded 3,000 captured
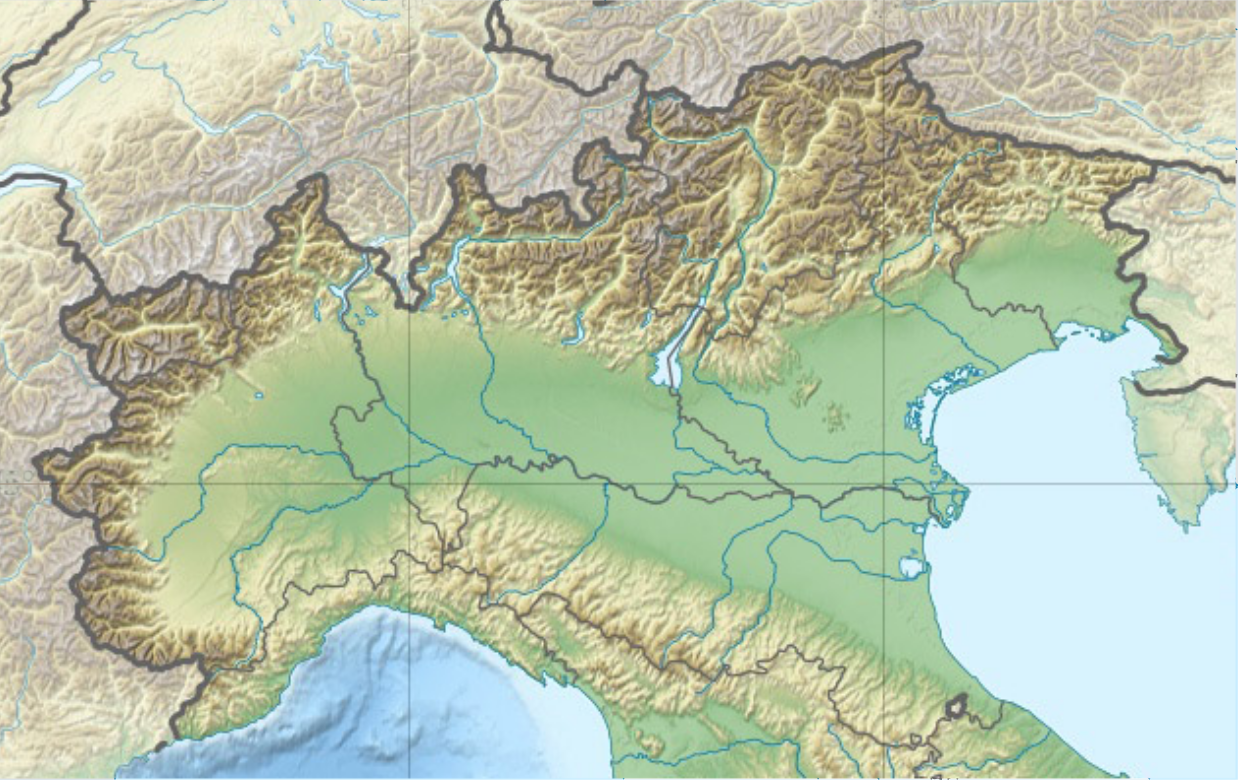
- Location within Northern Italy Battle of San Giorgio (Europe)

War of the First Coalition:
Italian Campaign
current battle
Napoleon as subordinate
Napoleon in command

The Battle of San Giorgio was fought on 14–15 September 1796 between French forces of the Army of Italy under Napoleon Bonaparte and Austrian troops commanded by Field Marshal Dagobert Sigmund von Wurmser. The engagement took place east of Mantua during the Italian campaign of 1796–1797 of the War of the First Coalition.

The French victory forced Wurmser’s army to retreat into Mantua, where it became trapped and subjected to a prolonged siege, marking the failure of Austria’s second attempt to relieve the fortress.

== Background ==
Napoleon Bonaparte assumed command of the Army of Italy in March 1796. Despite severe shortages of supplies and equipment, the army achieved a series of victories against Austrian and Piedmontese forces, compelling the Kingdom of Sardinia to seek peace and forcing Austrian armies to withdraw toward the Tyrol. French forces then laid siege to Mantua, one of Austria’s principal fortresses in northern Italy and a strategic position controlling access to the Po Valley.

In response, the Austrian high command dispatched Field Marshal Dagobert Sigmund von Wurmser to Italy with a newly assembled army of approximately 50,000 men. Advancing south from the Trentino, Wurmser forced Napoleon to lift the siege of Mantua in late July 1796. In an extraordinary display of military skill, exploiting the separation of the Austrian columns, Napoleon defeated General Peter Vitus von Quosdanovich at Lonato and Wurmser himself at Castiglione, compelling the Austrian army to retreat back into the Tyrol.

== Prelude ==
=== The Bassano campaign ===
After reinforcing Mantua with fresh troops and destroying the French siege works, Wurmser again withdrew into the Trentino. From Trento he received orders to divide his army: one force was to secure access to the Tyrol, while the main body advanced down the Brenta valley toward Mantua.

Napoleon, originally instructed to invade the Tyrol and link up with General Moreau, abandoned these plans after learning of Wurmser’s movement. Following a victory at Rovereto, French forces pursued the Austrian column and defeated it at Bassano on 8 September 1796. The defeat shattered Wurmser’s army, which split into several columns; one retreated east toward Friuli, while Wurmser marched south toward Mantua.

=== Race to Mantua ===
Contrary to French expectations, Wurmser continued his advance toward Mantua rather than retreating eastward. This decision forced Napoleon into a rapid pursuit intended to intercept the Austrians before they could reach the fortress.

Failures in French coordination allowed Wurmser to cross the Adige River at Legnago on 10 September after the bridge was left intact. Despite forced marches by French divisions under Masséna and Augereau, Austrian forces avoided encirclement and fought effective rear-guard actions. On 14 September, Wurmser defeated a small French detachment south of Mantua and entered the fortress, joining the besieged garrison.

Wurmser’s decision to concentrate his remaining forces inside Mantua effectively ended the Austrian army’s ability to conduct maneuver warfare in the open field. By abandoning further attempts at retreat or offensive movement, the field army was transformed into a besieged force dependent on the fortress for survival. Napoleon followed closely behind and immediately sought to prevent the Austrians from reestablishing communications east of the city. Recognizing that sealing Mantua would trap a substantial portion of the Austrian army, he prepared an immediate assault against Austrian positions outside the fortress, leading directly to the fighting at San Giorgio on 15 September.

== The battle ==
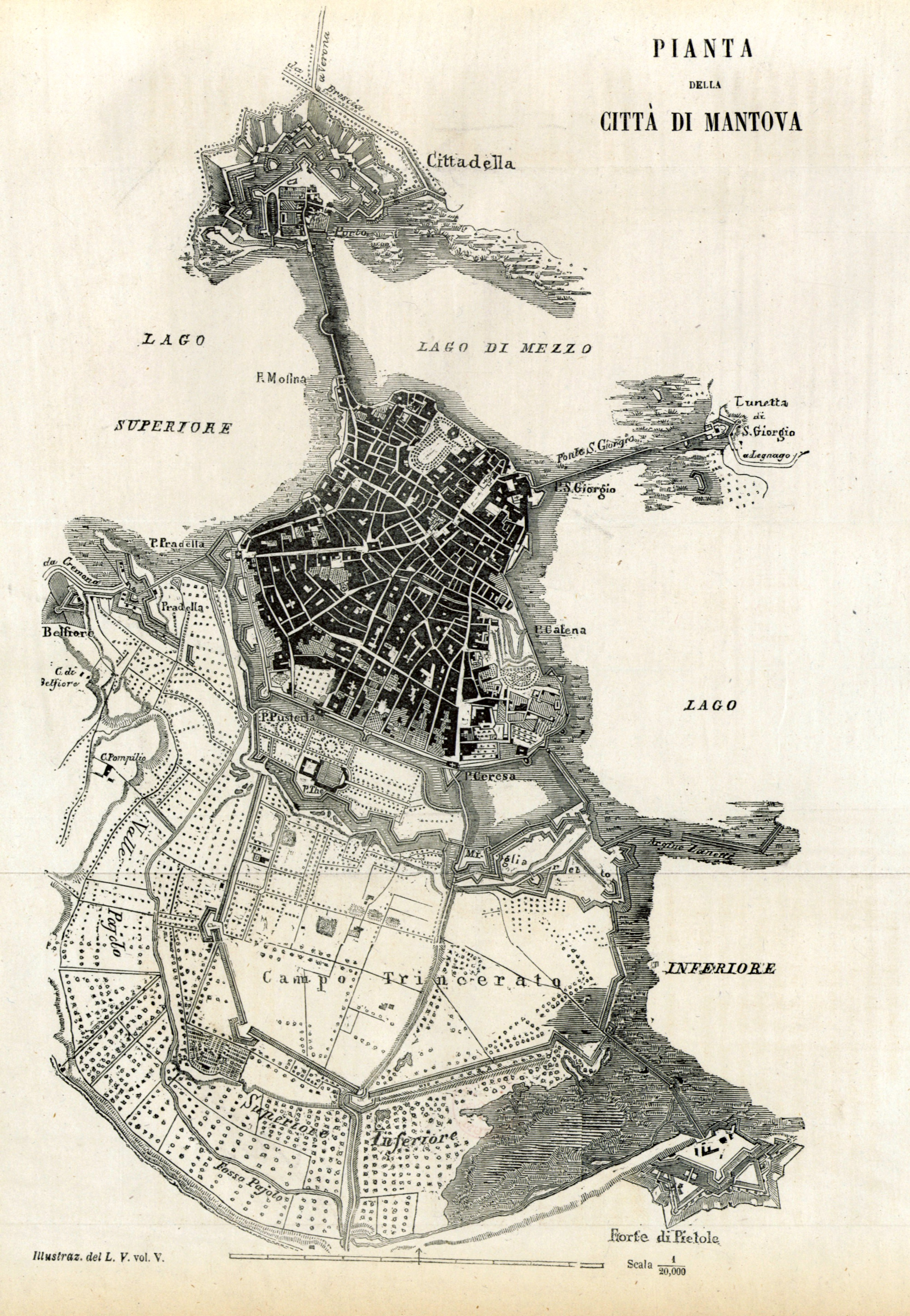
Map of Mantua; San Giorgio lies east of the city

On 15 September, Napoleon launched an immediate attack to prevent the Austrians from reestablishing communications east of Mantua. French forces advanced along the Mincio River toward San Giorgio. Initial attacks by General Louis-André Bon were checked by Austrian reserves, while fighting developed along the entire line northeast of the city.

The decisive phase began when Masséna’s division assaulted the Austrian center in dense columns. Heavy fighting followed, with repeated counterattacks directed by Wurmser himself. Several senior French officers, including Joachim Murat, Jean Lannes, and Victor, were wounded during the engagement.

By late afternoon, French troops captured San Giorgio, causing the Austrian line to collapse. Wurmser ordered a general withdrawal into Mantua. The French captured approximately 3,000 prisoners, three standards, and eleven artillery pieces.

== Aftermath ==
Following the defeat at San Giorgio, Wurmser withdrew his entire force into Mantua. A final Austrian attempt to reopen communications failed on 24 September, after which French forces completed the blockade of the fortress by 1 October 1796.

Although Napoleon failed to destroy Wurmser’s army in the field, the Austrian relief effort ended in failure. That night, the French bivouacked at the captured San Giorgio suburb and celebrated their success. Once again, Napoleon orchestrated a highly effective battle, capitalizing on maneuver, surprise, mass, and offensive action. During the Bassano operations, Austrian losses amounted to approximately 27,000 men, including nearly 18,000 captured, along with the loss of numerous guns and standards. Wurmser entered Mantua with roughly 16,000 men, while other Austrian formations retreated into the Tyrol and Friuli.

The French Army of Italy suffered approximately 7,500 casualties during the campaign. Nevertheless, Napoleon retained control of northern Italy and confined a large Austrian force within Mantua, where disease and shortages would steadily weaken the garrison over the following months.

== Bibliography ==
- Bodart, Gaston (1908). Militär-historisches Kriegs-Lexikon (1618–1905). Vienna: C. W. Stern.
- Chandler, David G. (1966). The Campaigns of Napoleon. New York: Simon & Schuster. OCLC 185576578.
- Clausewitz, Carl von (1992). The Italian Campaign of 1796. London: Greenhill Books. ISBN 9780700626762.
- Leggiere, Michael V. (2016). Napoleon and the Operational Art of War: Essays in Honor of Donald D. Horward. History of Warfare. Vol. 110. Brill. ISBN 978-90-04-27034-3.
- Fiebeger, G. J. (1911). The Campaigns of Napoleon Bonaparte of 1796–1797. West Point, NY: US Military Academy Printing Office.
- Rothenberg, Gunther E., ed. (1980). Napoleon on the Art of War. London: Greenhill Books.
