= Glandulosa =

Glandulosa may refer to:

- Glandulosa, a word used in systematic names
- Glandulosa (insect), a genus of crickets in the tribe Petaloptilini
