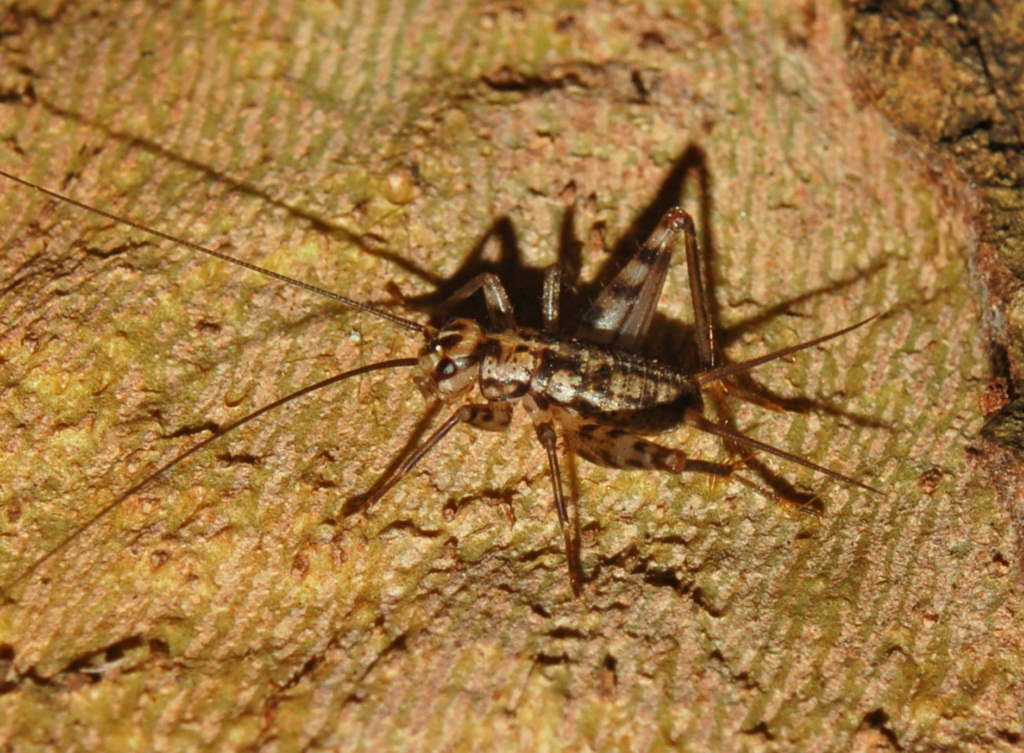
- Gryllomorpha dalmatina. Male

Scientific classification
- Kingdom: Animalia
- Phylum: Arthropoda
- Class: Insecta
- Order: Orthoptera
- Suborder: Ensifera
- Family: Gryllidae
- Subfamily: Gryllomorphinae
- Tribe: Gryllomorphini
- Genus: Gryllomorpha
- Species: G. dalmatina

Binomial name
- Gryllomorpha dalmatina (Ocskay, 1832)

Synonyms
- Acheta dalmatina Ocskay, 1832; Gryllomorpha fasciata Fieber, 1853; Gryllomorpha pieperi Harz, 1979; Gryllomorpha strumae Andreeva, 1982; Gryllus aptera Schaffer, 1838

= Gryllomorpha dalmatina =

Species of insect

Gryllomorpha dalmatina, common name wingless house-cricket, is a species of cricket belonging to the family Gryllidae subfamily Gryllomorphinae.

== Subspecies ==
Subspecies include:

- Gryllomorpha dalmatina cretensis (Ramme, 1927)
- Gryllomorpha dalmatina dalmatina (Ocskay, 1832)
- Gryllomorpha dalmatina minutissima (Gorochov & Ünal, 2012)
- Gryllomorpha dalmatina pieperi (Harz, 1979)
- Gryllomorpha dalmatina schmidti (Gorochov, 1996)

== Distribution ==
This cricket is mainly present in France, Italy, Slovenia, Spain, Switzerland, in the Near East and in North Africa.

== Description ==
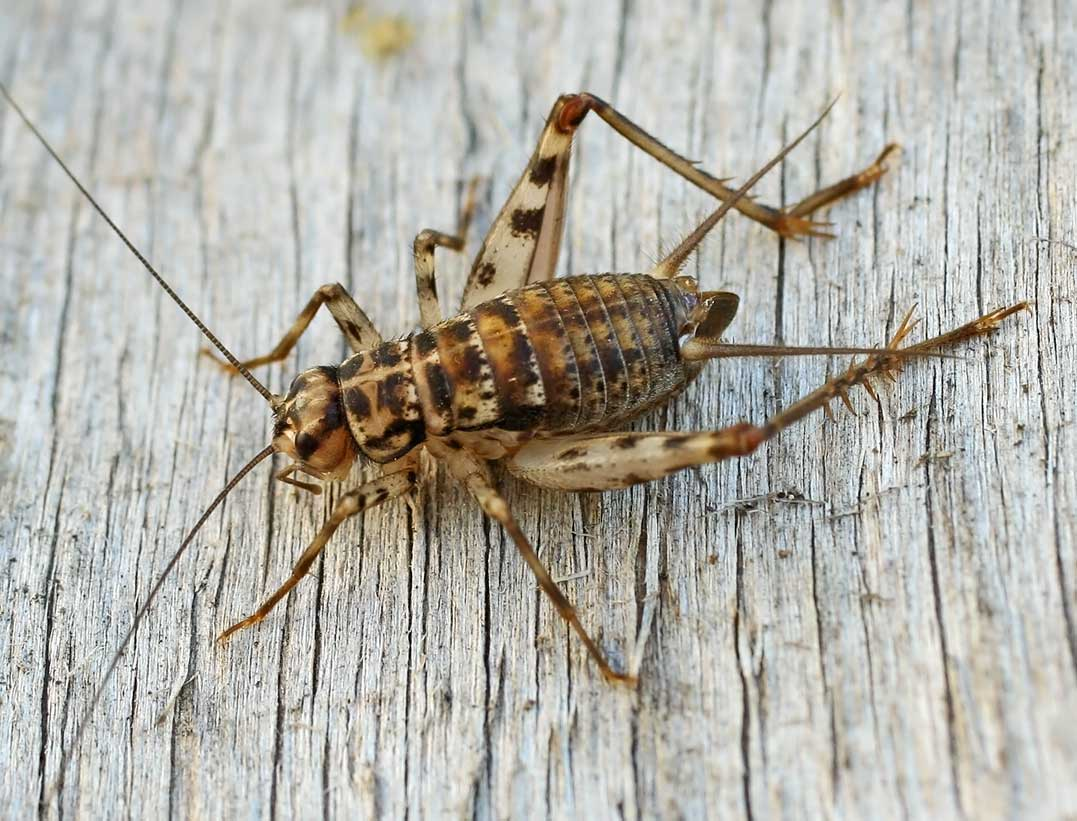
Dorsal view

Gryllomorpha dalmatina is the largest species of the genus Gryllomorpha. The adults grow up to 15–20 millimetres (0.59–0.79 in). They are wingless. The basic coloration of the body is pale brown, with dark-brown markings on the body and the legs. The antennae are very long. Also legs are rather long. The female ovipositor is long and thin and can reach a length of about 12–17 millimetres (0.47–0.67 in).

== Biology ==
They can commonly be encountered in nature from April through early Autumn, but in the domestic environment they are active all year round. They can be found in buildings, especially in dark moist places, as caves, cellars, basements, but also under stones and bark. As a matter of fact, these crickets fear the light and feed on organic debris.
