= Battle of Valvasone =

1797 battle during the War of the First Coalition

- Part of the Italian campaign of 1796–1797 in the War of the First Coalition
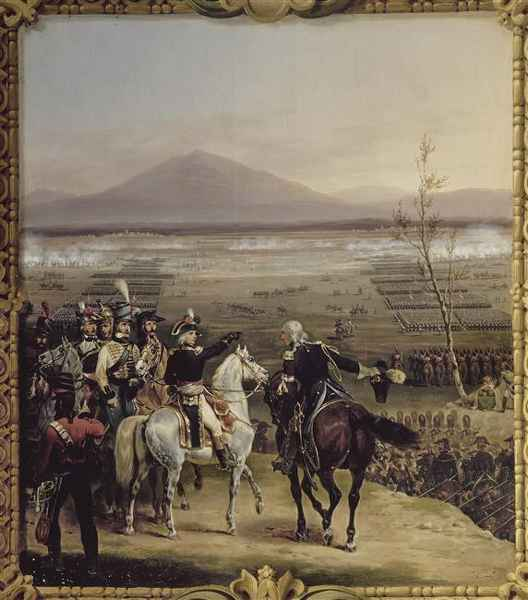
- Crossing of the Tagliamento, opposite Valvasone, led by General Bonaparte, 16 March 1797 by Prosper Lafaye, 1834-1837
Date	16 March 1797
Location	Valvasone, Italy 46.0000°N 12.8667°E
Result	French victory

Belligerents
France	Habsburg Austria

Commanders and leaders
Napoleon Bonaparte; Jean Baptiste Bernadotte; Charles Dugua; Jean Joseph Guieu; Louis François Jean Chabot; Jean-Mathieu-Philibert Sérurier	Archduke Charles; Adam Bajalics von Bajahaza

Units involved
Army of Italy	Austrian Army

Strength
Valvasone: 40,000; Gradisca d'Isonzo: 18,000	Valvasone: 5,000; Gradisca d'Isonzo: 2,500, 10 guns

Casualties and losses
Valvasone: 500; Gradisca d'Isonzo: 0	Valvasone: 700, 6 guns Gradisca d'Isonzo: 2,500, 10 guns
- Location within Europe

War of the First Coalition:
Italian Campaign
current battle
Napoleon as subordinate
Napoleon in command

The Battle of Valvasone (also known as the Battle of the Tagliamento) was fought on 16 March 1797 during the War of the First Coalition between the French Army of Italy commanded by General Napoleon Bonaparte and a Habsburg Austrian army under Archduke Charles. Taking place along the shallow banks of the Tagliamento River near Valvasone, the engagement resulted from Bonaparte’s strategic spring offensive aimed at advancing into the Austrian heartland following the fall of Mantua.

== Prelude ==
=== Strategic situation ===
Following the surrender of Mantua on 2 February 1797, General Napoleon Bonaparte secured control over northern Italy and neutralized the threat from the Papal States through the Treaty of Tolentino. Free to turn his attention to the Austrian heartland, Bonaparte planned a spring offensive through Friuli to force the Habsburg Monarchy into peace negotiations before Austrian reinforcements from the Rhine front could arrive.

To counter the French threat, the Aulic Council appointed Archduke Charles, Duke of Teschen, to take command of Habsburg forces in Italy. Arriving in late February, Charles inherited an army severely weakened by prior defeats and sickness. Facing roughly 40,000 French veterans with only 25,000 to 30,000 available troops, Charles determined to hold the river lines of Friuli to delay the French advance until reinforcements under Wilhelm Lothar Maria von Kerpen could join him from the Tyrol.

=== Advance to the Tagliamento ===
Bonaparte launched his offensive in early March 1797, advancing in two main columns. The primary force under Bonaparte pushed east across the Piave and Livenza rivers, while a secondary column under Barthélemy Catherine Joubert moved north through the Tyrol to isolate Kerpen’s detachment.

Outflanked along successive positions, Archduke Charles ordered his main body to pull back behind the Tagliamento River near the town of Valvasone. The Tagliamento offered a broad, gravelly riverbed that was normally shallow in spring, but its wide open banks provided clear fields of fire for Austrian artillery and cavalry. Charles deployed his troops along the eastern bank, aiming to prevent a French crossing and force a prolonged delay.

== Armies ==
=== French Army ===
General Napoleon Bonaparte’s Army of Italy committed approximately 40,000 men to the advance against the Tagliamento River defenses. The force present at Valvasone was organized into several infantry divisions supported by a strong cavalry reserve:

- Division Guieu: Commanded by General Jean Joseph Guieu, forming the left-center assault column.
- Division Bernadotte: Commanded by General Jean-Baptiste Bernadotte, forming the right-center assault column.
- Division Masséna: Commanded by General André Masséna, operating further north to cover the left flank near Gemona and cut off potential Austrian retreat routes toward the Tarvis Pass.
- Division Sérurier: Commanded by General Jean Mathieu Philibert Sérurier, held in operational reserve.
- Cavalry Reserve: Commanded by General Charles Edward Jennings de Kilmaine, screening the riverbank and providing flank support.

=== Austrian Army ===
Archduke Charles commanded a force of roughly 25,000 to 30,000 troops along the Friulian theater, but only about 7,000 to 10,000 men were directly positioned behind the earthworks and river defenses at Valvasone during the engagement. The Austrian defensive line was structured around several key detachments:

- Infantry Formations: Composed of mixed line infantry regiments and newly raised reserve battalions, positioned behind low earthworks lining the eastern bank of the Tagliamento River.
- Cavalry Guard: Strong detachments of hussars and cuirassiers deployed on the open gravel plains near the river, intended to exploit clear terrain for counter-charges against any crossing attempts.
- Artillery Reserve: Batteries stationed along elevated terrain near the river bank to sweep the shallow crossing points with direct roundshot and canister fire.

== Battle ==
=== Feint and initial crossing ===
On the morning of 16 March 1797, the French vanguard reached the western bank of the Tagliamento River near Valvasone. The Austrian forces under Archduke Charles were positioned behind prepared earthworks on the opposite bank, supported by heavy cavalry and artillery sweeping the open gravel riverbed.

Recognizing that a direct assault against a fully alerted defender across open terrain would incur heavy losses, General Napoleon Bonaparte employed a tactical ruse. At around noon, he ordered his troops to halt, unbuckle their equipment, and establish camp as if preparing to rest for the night. Deceived by the maneuver, the Austrian commanders relaxed their state of readiness and allowed several units to fall back into camp.

At approximately 13:00, Bonaparte abruptly ordered his divisions back under arms. Forming dense assault columns protected by light infantry skirmishers, the divisions of General Jean-Baptiste Bernadotte on the right and General Jean Joseph Guieu on the left surged out of the tree line and plunged into the shallow, multi-channel riverbed.

=== Breach of the river defenses ===
The sudden French advance caught the Austrian defenders off guard before they could fully reform their battle lines. Crossing the low waters of the Tagliamento in tight order, French skirmishers established a bridgehead on the eastern gravel banks and engaged the hastily re-formed Austrian perimeter.

As Bernadotte and Guieu pushed their infantry columns across, Archduke Charles ordered his cavalry reserve, supported by battery artillery, to execute a series of counter-charges across the plain to drive the French back into the riverbed. French infantry formed tactical squares to repel the Austrian horsemen, while light artillery pieces were dragged across the shallow channels to support the advance.

Seeing the Austrian line falter under combined infantry and artillery fire, French General Charles Edward Jennings de Kilmaine led a cavalry charge into the flank of the Austrian horsemen. The counter-attack broke the cohesion of the Austrian cavalry, forcing them to retreat toward the main line and leaving the riverbank earthworks exposed to French infantry assault.

=== Austrian retreat ===
With their riverline defenses breached and their cavalry driven back, the Austrian infantry positions along the eastern bank were turned by French columns expanding out from the bridgehead. Recognizing that his remaining force risked being encircled or overwhelmed by superior numbers, Archduke Charles ordered a general withdrawal toward Codroipo and the Isonzo River valley.

A rearguard detachment of Austrian cavalry and light troops attempted to delay the pursuit, but French forces maintained rapid pressure through the evening, capturing six Austrian artillery pieces and taking several hundred prisoners during the retreat. By nightfall, French troops had secured both banks of the Tagliamento River, establishing a firm base of operations to continue their push into Friuli.

== Aftermath ==
=== Casualties and losses ===
The engagement at Valvasone resulted in relatively low casualties considering the size of the forces involved. French casualties were estimated at approximately 500 killed, wounded, or missing.

Austrian losses during the direct river combat amounted to roughly 700 men killed, wounded, or captured, along with six artillery pieces abandoned on the field. However, Austrian losses expanded significantly during the immediate retreat over the next 24 hours, culminating in the loss of thousands more captured during subsequent pursuit operations.

=== Capitulation of Gradisca ===
Following the crossing at the Tagliamento, General Bonaparte immediately pressed his advantage to prevent Archduke Charles from reforming a defensive barrier along the Isonzo River. On 17 March 1797, French troops under General Bernadotte pursued the retreating Austrian units toward the fortress town of Gradisca d'Isonzo.

Finding the fortress garrison isolated and surrounded by advancing French columns, Bernadotte demanded its surrender. Realizing that support from Archduke Charles was cut off, the Austrian commander, Field Marshal-Lieutenant Adam Bajalics von Bajahaza, capitulated. The surrender resulted in the capture of approximately 2,500 Austrian troops, 10 artillery pieces, and significant military stores without substantial further combat.

=== Strategic results ===
The defeat at Valvasone shattered the primary Austrian defensive line in Friuli and forced Archduke Charles to execute a deep retreat through the Julian Alps toward Klagenfurt. Simultaneously, General André Masséna defeated Austrian detachments at the Battle of Tarvis, securing control of the critical mountain passes and severing direct communication between Charles’s main body and Austrian forces in the Tyrol.

With no defensible terrain remaining before Vienna and his armies fragmented, Archduke Charles advised the imperial court to seek terms. The French advance culminated in the signing of the Preliminaries of Leoben on 18 April 1797, which suspended hostilities and laid the groundwork for the Treaty of Campo Formio, effectively ending the War of the First Coalition.
