= Battle of Tarvis (1797) =

Battle of the War of the First Coalition

- Part of the Italian campaign of 1796–1797 in the War of the First Coalition
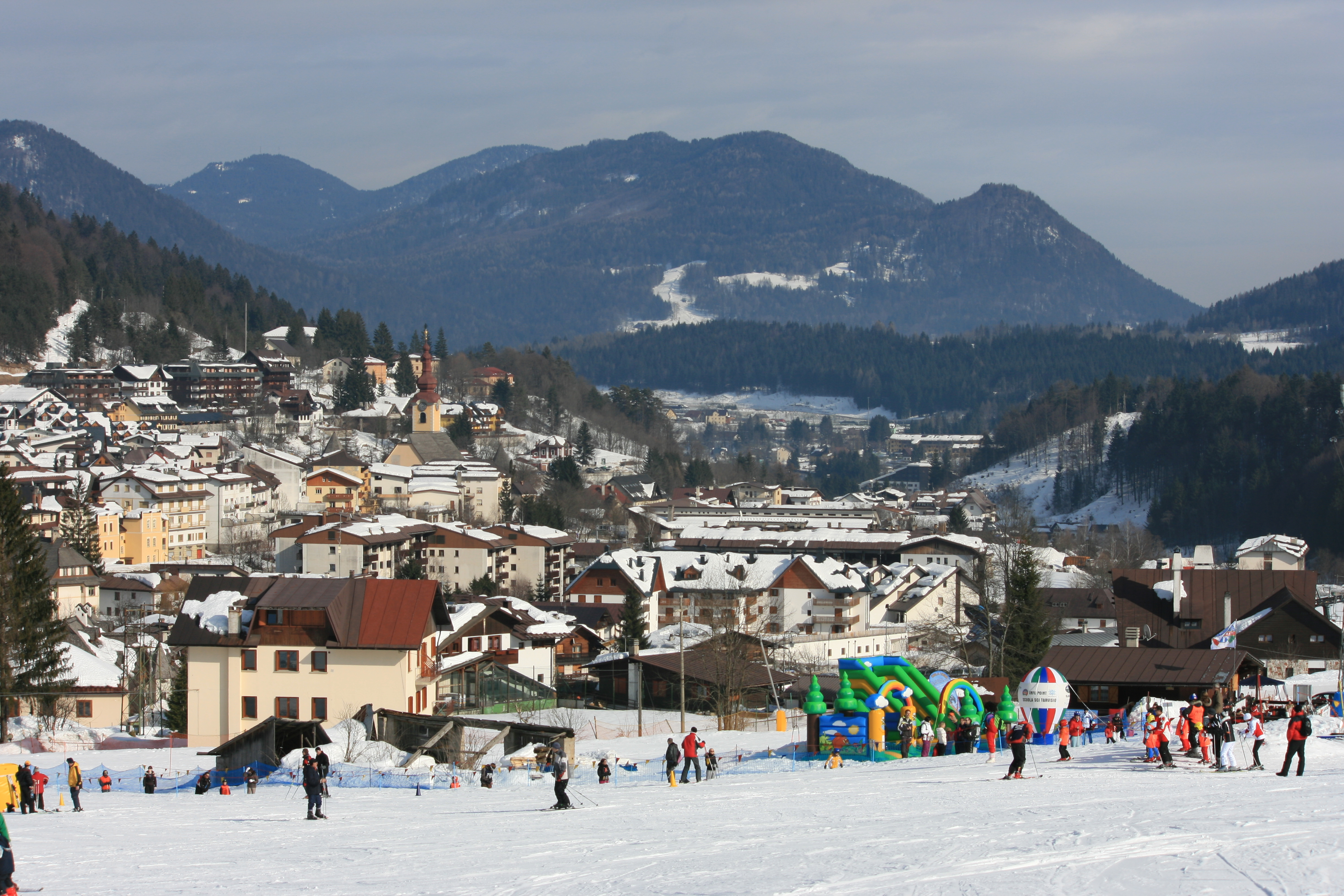
- The photo shows the terrain near Tarvisio.
Date	21–23 March 1797
Location	Tarvisio, Italy (at time Austria) 46°30′18″N 13°34′42″E
Result	French victory

Belligerents
France	(Holy Roman Empire) Habsburg Austria

Commanders and leaders
(France) Napoleon Bonaparte (France) Guillaume Brune (France) André Masséna (France) Jean Joseph Guieu	(Holy Roman Empire) Archduke Charles (Holy Roman Empire) Adam Bajalics (Holy Roman Empire) Samuel de Nagy-Varád (Holy Roman Empire) Joseph Ocskay

Units involved
(France) Army of Italy	(Holy Roman Empire) Austrian Army

Strength
11,000	8,000

Casualties and losses
1,200 dead or wounded	4,500 (including 3,500 captured from Bajalics' column); 25 guns 400–500 wagons

War of the First Coalition:
Italian Campaign
current battle
Napoleon as subordinate
Napoleon in command

The Battle of Tarvis was fought during 21–23 March 1797 near present-day Tarvisio in far northeast Italy, about 12 kilometres (7 mi) west-by-southwest of the three-border conjunction with Austria and Slovenia, and was the final battle before the end of the War of the First Coalition. In the battle, three divisions of a First French Republic army commanded by Napoleon Bonaparte attacked several columns of the retreating Habsburg Austrian army led by Archduke Charles, Duke of Teschen. In three days of confused fighting, French divisions directed by André Masséna, Jean Joseph Guieu, and Jean-Mathieu-Philibert Sérurier succeeded in blocking the Tarvis Pass and capturing 3,500 Austrians led by Adam Bajalics von Bajahaza. The engagement occurred during the War of the First Coalition, part of the French Revolutionary Wars.

After Bonaparte's capture of the fortress of Mantua in early February 1797, he cleared his south flank by crushing the army of the Papal States. Reinforced with forces from the Rhine front, Bonaparte was determined to drive the Austrian army from northeast Italy. His offensive began in March and consisted of a secondary drive through the County of Tyrol by Barthélemy Catherine Joubert's left wing and an eastward thrust by Bonaparte's main army.

The main French army soon drove the archduke's forces into headlong retreat while Joubert battled with Wilhelm Lothar Maria von Kerpen in the Tyrol. Charles tried to hold the Tarvis Pass against the French by sending three columns of reinforcements, but they found the pass held by Masséna's French forces. While many Austrian troops fought their way out, the last column was trapped between three converging French divisions and compelled to surrender. A subsequent advance brought the French within 75 miles (121 km) of the Austrian capital of Vienna. In mid-April, Bonaparte proposed and the Austrians agreed to the Preliminaries of Leoben. Most of the terms were ratified by the Treaty of Campo Formio in October 1797, ending the long war.

== Background ==
=== Fall of Mantua ===
On 2 February 1797, the Siege of Mantua ended when Feldmarschall Dagobert Sigmund von Wurmser surrendered the fortress of Mantua. In recognition of his doughty defense, Wurmser, his staff, and an escort of 700 soldiers were allowed free passage to Austrian lines. An additional 20,000 Austrians were paroled on the promise that they would not fight against France until exchanged. The siege cost the garrison 16,333 killed, wounded, or died of disease. The French captured 325 artillery pieces in Mantua and recovered 179 of their own guns that were lost earlier in the siege.

General of Division Napoleon Bonaparte was not present for the capitulation, having left a few days earlier to press the war against the Papal States. Following instructions from Bonaparte, General of Division Jean-Mathieu-Philibert Sérurier refused to amend the initial French surrender proposals. At length, Wurmser acquiesced and accepted Bonaparte's terms. Columns of disarmed Austrians marched out of Mantua on 4, 5, and 6 February.

=== French offensive ===
Meanwhile, important events were taking place elsewhere. On 3 February, a 9,000-man French column under General of Division Claude Perrin Victor crushed a 7,000-strong Papal States force led by Feldmarschall-Leutnant Michelangelo Alessandro Colli-Marchi in the Battle of Faenza (Battle of Castel Bolognese). For the loss of only 100 men, the French inflicted 800 killed and wounded on their enemies and captured 1,200 soldiers, 14 guns, 8 colors, and 8 caissons. On 9 February, the 1,200-man Papal States garrison of Ancona surrendered to Victor. Bonaparte soon forced the Pope to agree to the Treaty of Tolentino, compelling the Papal States to disgorge 30 million francs.

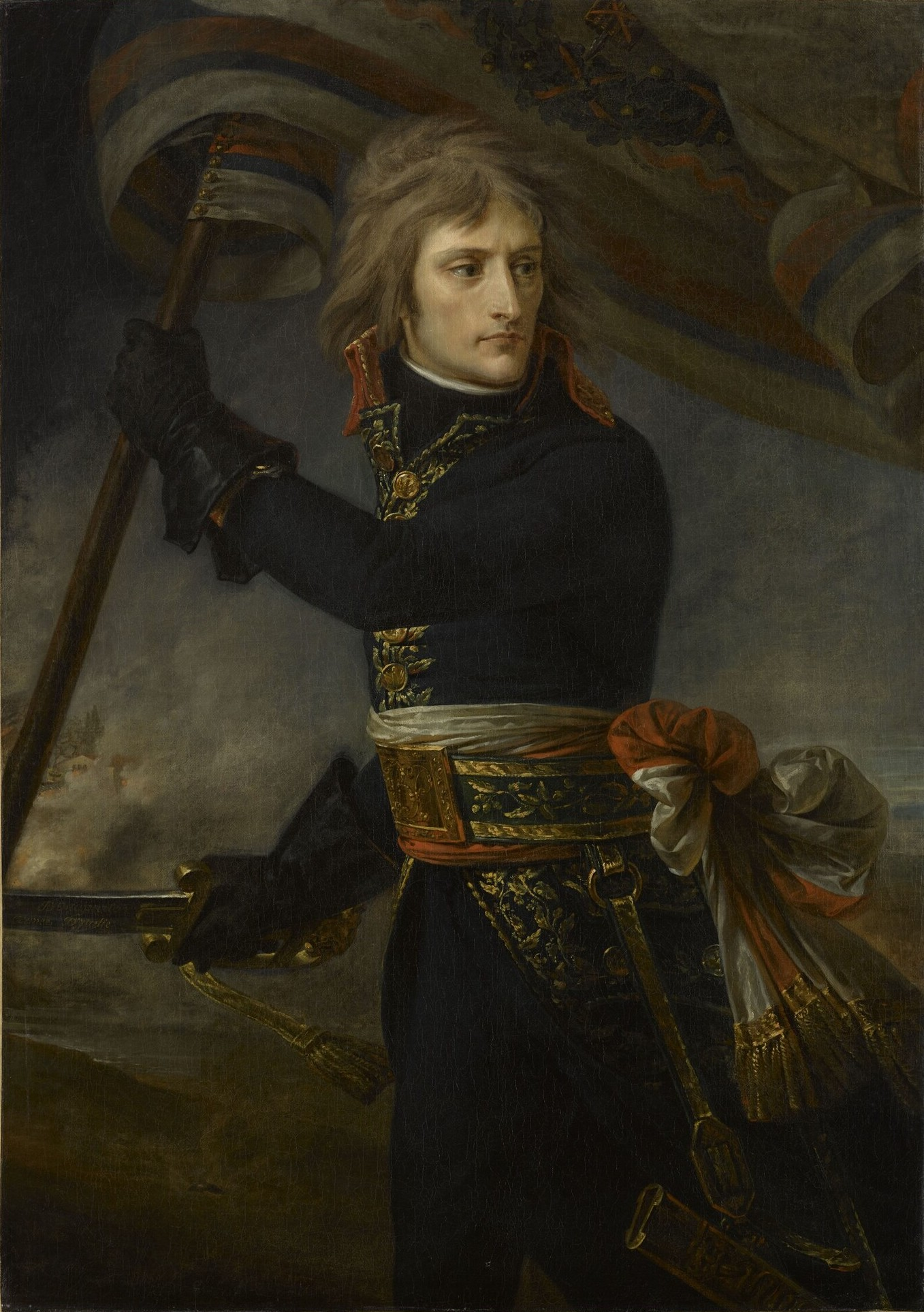
Napoleon Bonaparte

During 1796, the campaign in Germany had received priority in terms of French troop reinforcements. But after a significant lack of success in the Rhine theater, the French government in Paris belatedly decided to send reinforcements to Italy. Generals of Division Jean-Baptiste Bernadotte and Antoine Guillaume Delmas were transferred to the Italian front with their troops.

Although the new Austrian commander in Italy, Feldmarschall Archduke Charles, Duke of Teschen had 50,000 troops, they were distributed over a wide front. Bonaparte was determined to attack Charles before the Austrians were ready. Having 60,000 men available, Bonaparte planned to attack through Friuli with two-thirds of these troops. The French commander posted General of Division Barthélemy Joubert with about 20,000 troops to protect the Tyrol against a possible Austrian attack in that quarter. If no threat developed, Joubert was ordered to rendezvous with Bonaparte in the Drava River valley.

With General of Division Pierre Augereau on leave, General of Division Jean Joseph Guieu assumed command of his division. Generals of Division André Masséna, Bernadotte, and Sérurier also marched with Bonaparte's main body. At the end of February, the French advance began with he crossing of the Brenta River. The weather enforced a suspension of operations, but on 10 March, the French drove forward again in two columns. Bonaparte took 32,000 troops through Sacile, aiming for Valvasone. Guarding the left flank were Masséna and 11,000 more men. Charles deployed his main force between Spilimbergo and San Vito al Tagliamento. On the 14th, Masséna clashed with a small force of Austrians under General-major Franz Joseph, Marquis de Lusignan.

On 16 March 1797, the divisions of Guieu and Bernadotte attacked across the Tagliamento River under cover of artillery fire. In the Battle of Valvasone, the French inflicted 700 casualties on their foes and captured six guns. The next day, Bernadotte scored a coup at Gradisca d'Isonzo when he cut off and forced a 2,500-man enemy column to surrender. Three battalions of the Hoch und Deutschmeister Infantry Regiment Nr. 4, one battalion of the Splényi Infantry Regiment Nr. 51, 10 guns, and 8 colors fell into French hands.

Meanwhile, about 300 kilometres (186 mi) to the west, Joubert and 18,000 men clashed with Feldmarschall-Leutnant Wilhelm Lothar Maria von Kerpen's 12,000 troops on 20 March at St. Michael, near present-day Salorno, Italy. Kerpen's Austrian force included five battalions in two regular infantry regiments plus elements of a third, three squadrons of dragoons, and 5,000 Tyrolese militia. In the battle, Joubert's troops routed their opponents inflicting losses of 300 killed and wounded plus 3,500 captured, while suffering 200 French killed and wounded.

== Battle ==
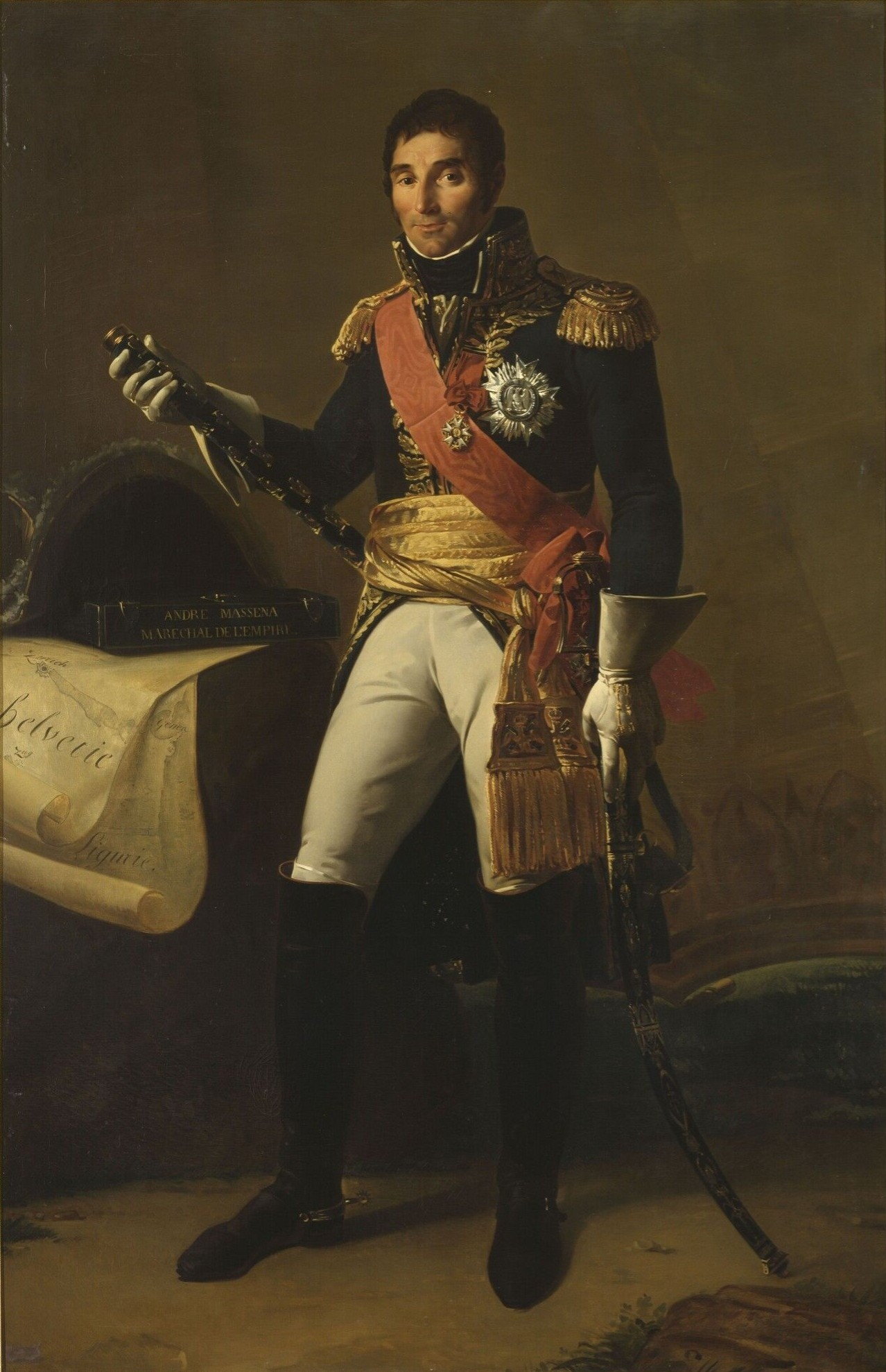
André Masséna played a key role in trapping the Austrians.

As Masséna pushed toward Tarvisio (Tarvis), driving Lusignan before him, the Archduke sent three divisions to hold the pass. However, as they arrived in the vicinity the Austrians found themselves caught between Masséna and Bonaparte's other divisions which operated against their rear. In the first clash on 21 March, Masséna's advance guard pushed General-major Joseph Ocskay von Ocsko's Austrians out of Tarvis, blocking the escape route. Later that day, General-major Charles Philippe Vinchant de Gontroeul appeared with another column and drove the French from Tarvis. Masséna launched a heavy assault on the 22nd, dispossessing Gontroeul of the town and forcing him to withdraw toward Villach.

This left Feldmarschall-Leutnant Adam Bajalics von Bajahaza's Austrian column on the wrong side of the pass. Bajalics and General-major Samuel Köblös de Nagy-Varád battled on 22 March against the divisions of Masséna, Guieu, and Sérurier. The next day they surrendered 4,000 Austrian soldiers, 25 artillery pieces, and 500 wagons. According to another source, the French captured 3,500 Austrians, 25 guns, and 400 vehicles. In the different clashes, the French suffered 1,200 casualties while inflicting a loss of 1,000 killed and wounded on their opponents.

The 3rd Battalion of the Klebek Infantry Regiment Nr. 14, 4th Battalion of the Archduke Anton Infantry Regiment Nr. 52, and Khevenhüller Grenadier Battalion were captured. Other Austrian units involved in the fighting were two battalions of the Fürstenburg Infantry Regiment Nr. 36, three battalions of the Nadásdy Infantry Regiment Nr. 39, Rüdt Grenadier Battalion, four squadrons of the Erdödy Hussar Regiment Nr. 11, and one squadron of the Toscana Dragoon Regiment Nr. 26.

== Aftermath ==
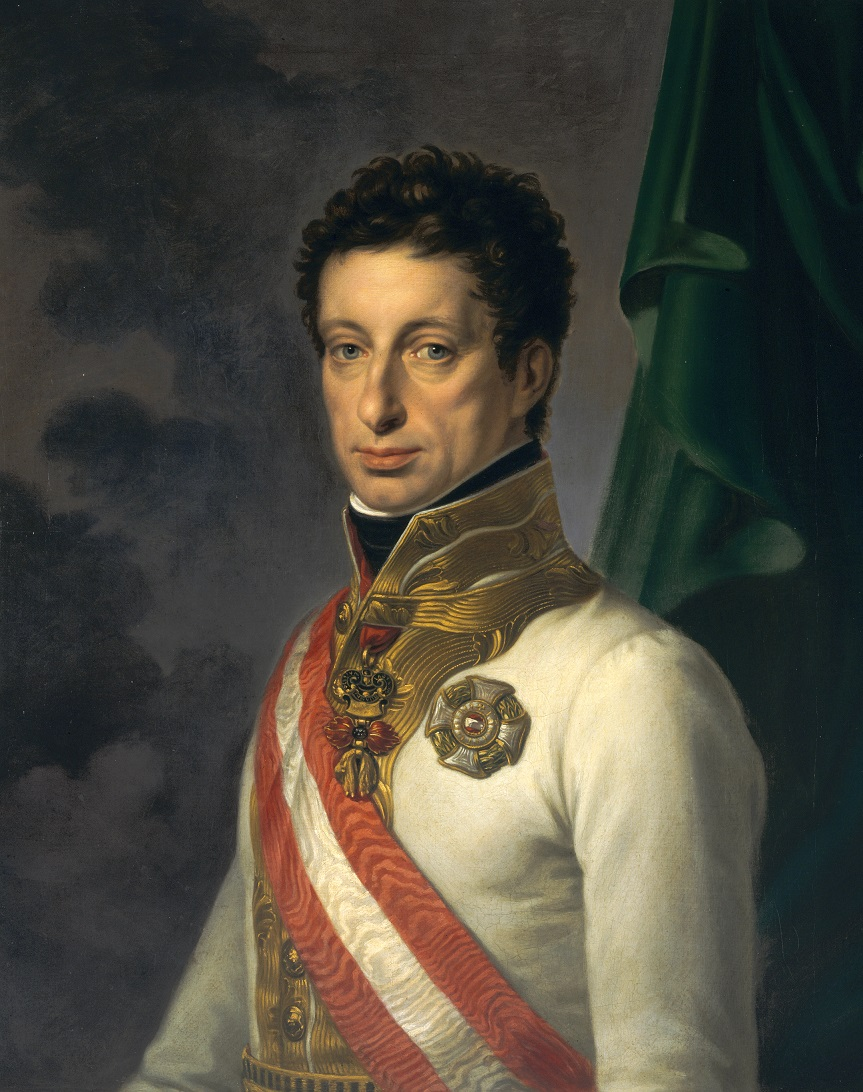
Archduke Charles proved unable to stop Bonaparte's offensive.

While Bernadotte pursued the part of Charles' army that retreated toward Ljubljana (Laybach), General of Division Charles Dugua occupied the port of Trieste with a cavalry column. With his supply line lengthening, Bonaparte created a new center of operations at Palmanova. To prevent his strategic left flank from being molested, Bonaparte ordered Joubert to secure Brixen. At this time General of Division Louis François Jean Chabot took over the division of Sérurier, who was ill. On 29 March, divisions of Masséna, Guieu, and Chabot captured Klagenfurt.

With too few troops available for an offensive, Bonaparte changed his center of operations to Klagenfurt and ordered the independent columns of Joubert, Bernadotte, and Victor (from the Papal States) to join him there. General of Brigade Louis Friant was assigned to hold Trieste with 1,500 soldiers. On 31 March Bonaparte sent a letter to Archduke Charles asking for an armistice. He hoped that this would gain time for General of Division Jean Victor Marie Moreau's offensive in Germany to get started. To bluff Charles into thinking the French were in great strength, Bonaparte drove his men forward. On 7 April they seized Leoben, only 75 miles (121 km) from Vienna. On that day the Austrians agreed to a five-day suspension of hostilities.

After securing an additional five-day truce on the 13th, Bonaparte proposed the start of negotiations on 16 April, even though he had no authority to do so. Aware that the French were on the brink of launching an offensive on the Rhine, the Austrians signed the Preliminaries of Leoben on the 18th. Most of the terms of this agreement were confirmed by the Treaty of Campo Formio on 17 October 1797. The armistice was followed by pointless fighting on the Rhine. On the 18th, a French army under General of Division Lazare Hoche defeated Feldmarschall-Leutnant Franz von Werneck's forces at the Battle of Neuwied. Moreau's army finally lurched into action on 20 and 21 April when it drove back the troops of Feldmarschall-Leutnant Anton Count Sztáray de Nagy-Mihaly in the Battle of Diersheim.

During the fighting at Tarvis, Joubert's column continued to advance. The French general repulsed an attack by General-major Johann Ludwig Alexius von Loudon at Neumarkt on 21 March. Dropping off Antoine Guillaume Delmas' 5,000-man division to guard his supply line, Joubert pressed forward to Klausen where he again defeated Kerpen on 22 March. The Austrian retreated northeast to Mittenwald where he was beaten again on 28 March and pushed out of Sterzing. With the Tyrolese militia turning out in droves to fight the French invaders, Joubert was compelled to fall back to Brixen. On 31 March, Kerpen attacked the French at Brixen but was unable to dislodge them. After being reinforced to 12,000 men by the arrival of Laudon's brigade, Kerpen again assaulted Brixen on 2 April without success. Nevertheless, under continuing pressure, Delmas withdrew from Bolzano (Bozen) on 4 April. The next day, Joubert set out for Villach and the appointed junction with Bonaparte. After continuous skirmishing with the Tyroleans, his column reached there on 8 May, well after the Leoben agreement. During Joubert's campaign French losses may have reached as high as 8,000 men.
