= Joseph Ocskay von Ocsko =

Habsburg general

Joseph Ocskay von Ocskó
- Born: 1740; Ocskó, Kingdom of Hungary (now Očkov, Slovakia)
- Died: 8 December 1805 (aged 64–65); Dubovány, Kingdom of Hungary (now Dubovany Slovakia)
- Military career
- Allegiance: Habsburg monarchy
- Rank: General-Major
- Conflicts: French Revolutionary Wars; Battle of Lonato; Battle of Calliano; Battle of Rivoli; Siege of Mantua; Action at Casa Sola
- Awards: Military Order of Maria Theresa, KC (1789)

Joseph Ocskay von Ocskó (1740 – 8 December 1805) joined the army of the Habsburg monarchy and rose to the rank of general officer during the French Revolutionary Wars. He fought in numerous actions in the Italian campaign of 1796–1797 against the French army commanded by Napoleon Bonaparte. In particular, he led a combat brigade during the first, third, and fourth Austrian attempts to relieve the Siege of Mantua.

== Early career ==
Born in Vrbove, Kingdom of Hungary (today Vrbove, Slovakia) in 1739, Ocskay joined the Habsburg military and earned promotion to Major in 1782. Whether he fought in the Austro-Turkish War (1787-1791) is not known. However, he received the Knight's Cross of the Military Order of Maria Theresa on 21 December 1789, and was granted the noble title Freiherr on 28 July 1790. He served in the French Revolutionary Wars and became a General-Major on 1 January 1794. In early 1796, he commanded a brigade in the Army of the Upper Rhine.

== Italian campaign ==
=== First relief of Mantua ===
In April 1796, Bonaparte's successes in the Montenotte Campaign forced the Kingdom of Sardinia-Piedmont to quit the First Coalition. In May, the French Army of Italy defeated Johann Peter Beaulieu's Habsburg army and drove it from the Duchy of Milan. Bonaparte's victory in the Battle of Borghetto isolated the key fortress of Mantua. These setbacks prompted the Austrian high command to order substantial reinforcements in soldiers to Italy. Ocskay transferred to Dagobert von Wurmser's Italian army as part of this strategic shift.

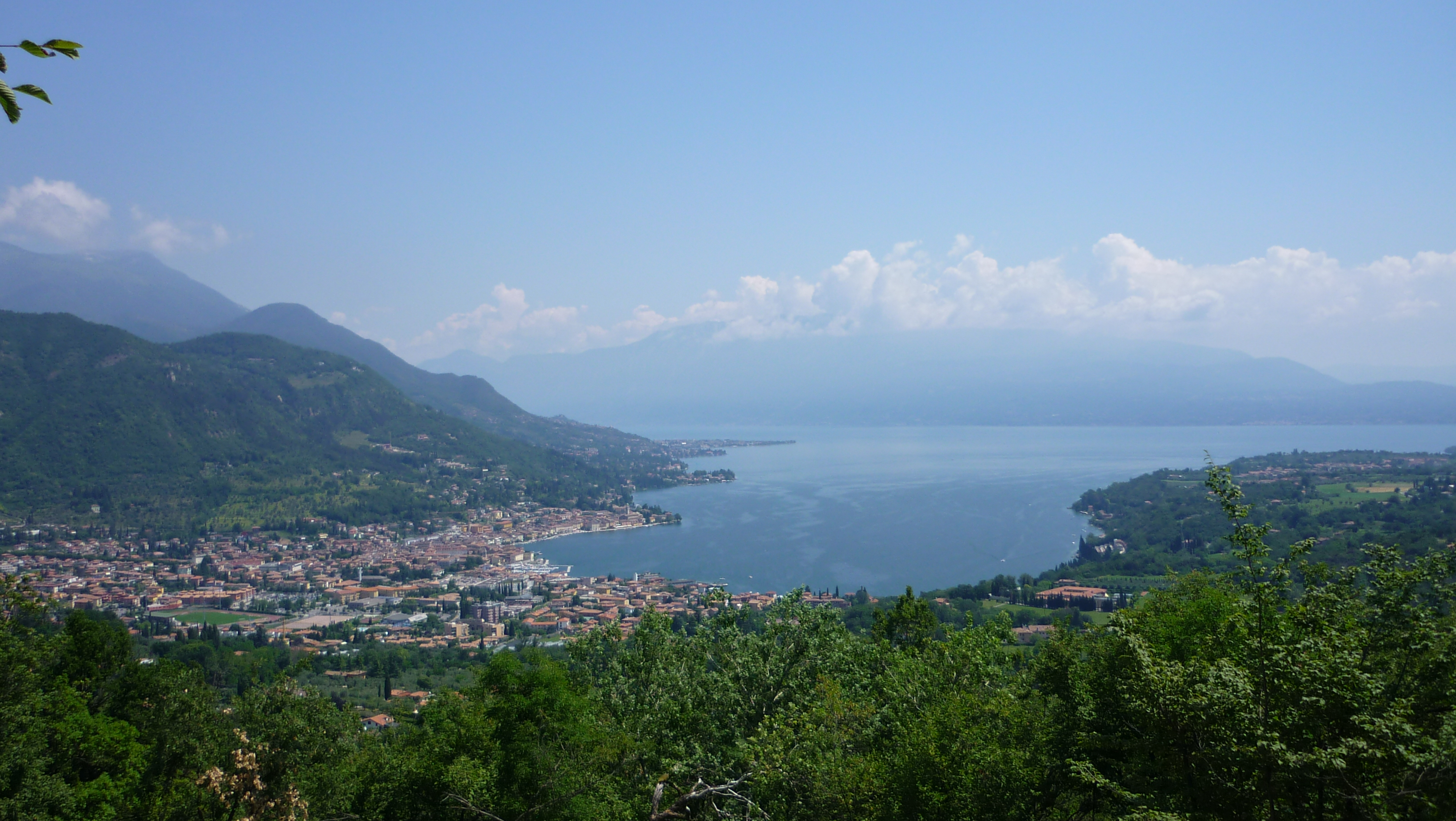
Salò and Lake Garda

In late July 1796, Ocskay led a brigade in the Right Column under Peter Quasdanovich in the first attempt to relieve the Siege of Mantua. On 29 July, the brigades of Ocskay and Peter Ott surprised and defeated Pierre Sauret's French troops at Gavardo and Salò on the west side of Lake Garda. Since 400 Frenchmen led by Jean Guieu barricaded themselves in a palace in Salò, Ocskay's troops besieged the enemy soldiers while Ott pursued operations farther to the south. On the 31st, Sauret's division attacked Ocskay, drove him off after a hard fight, and rescued Guieu's men. Then the French troops abandoned the town and marched back to Lonato del Garda.

After losing both Salò and Brescia, Quasdanovich ordered his brigades to concentrate on Gavardo on 2 August. Then, in an attempt to break through to Wurmser's main army, the Right Column commander ordered a new advance for the following day. He directed Ocskay to reoccupy Salò, then march south to attack Lonato. Marching in the early morning hours from Salò to Lonato, Ocskay's troops unwittingly marched right past Sauret's division heading for Salò. At dawn on 3 August, he surprised and defeated Jean Pijon's French brigade, capturing its commander. However, the Battle of Lonato ended badly for the Austrians. Quasdanovich's other Austrian brigades had been ordered to converge on Lonato, but instead they were forced to defend themselves against aggressive French attacks. Consequently, Ocskay's troops became isolated. Under Bonaparte's supervision, the André Masséna counterattacked Lonato with four brigades at mid-day. Driven from the town, Ocskay with many of his troops was encircled and forced to surrender. A second Austrian brigade under the Prince of Reuss belatedly appeared and freed some of Ocskay's men, but it was soon forced to retreat. The heavy losses compelled Quasdanovich to retreat north into the mountains. On 5 August, Bonaparte concentrated against Wurmser and defeated him in the Battle of Castiglione.

=== Third relief of Mantua ===
After being released in a prisoner exchange, Ocskay led a brigade in Paul Davidovich's Tyrol Corps during the third attempt to relieve Mantua. During these operations, he fought in the action at Cembra on 2 November, the Battle of Calliano on 6–7 November, and the combat of Rivoli Veronese on 17 November. Before the latter action, he led his soldiers over snow-covered mountain trails to reach the battlefield. He then launched a successful attack that helped rout the French. These victories proved hollow when the French defeated the main Habsburg army at the Battle of Arcole on 15–17 November. On 22 November, Bonaparte fell on the Tyrol Corps with most of his strength and drove it back toward Trento.

=== Fourth relief of Mantua ===
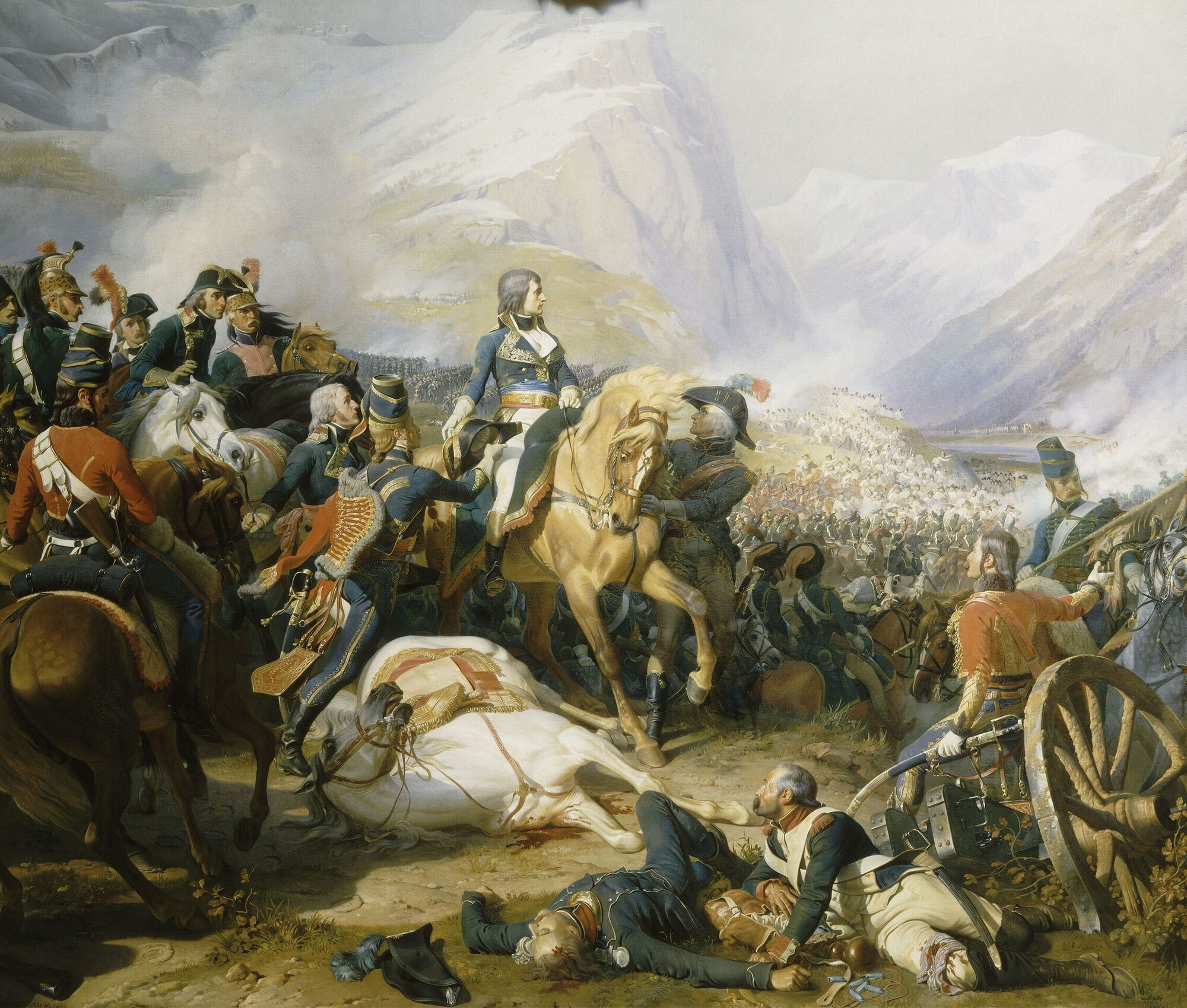
Napoleon at the Battle of Rivoli by Félix Philippoteaux, 1844

During the fourth attempt to relieve Mantua, Ocskay commanded the 4th Column of six columns engaged in the Battle of Rivoli on 14 January 1797. At first, his and Prince Reuss' columns marched with Quasdanovich's division in the Adige River gorge. Shortly before the battle, Ocskay's soldiers were ordered to join the troops massing on the slopes of Monte Baldo to the west. Together with the columns of Anton Lipthay de Kisfalud and Samuel Köblös, his troops attacked the Trombasore Heights. Despite brave and repeated efforts, especially by the 3rd and 4th Columns, the Austrian attack failed and many soldiers became casualties or prisoners.

After the defeat at Rivoli, Mantua surrendered to Bonaparte on 2 February. Under the command of Archduke Charles, the Austrian army made a fighting retreat out of Italy in March 1797. Ocskay was defeated by Masséna at Casa Sola on 20 March. After losing 500 men, he was forced back through the pass at Tarvisio. Later-arriving Austrian units led by Adam Bajalics von Bajahaza were cut off by Masséna and Guieu and forced to surrender.

== Later career ==
Ocskay retired from the army in 1797. He died on 8 December 1805 at Dubovány in the Upper Hungary region of (modern-day Dubovany in Slovakia). His son, Franz Ocskay von Ocskó (1775–1851) became a noted entomologist who wrote several articles describing new species of insects.
