= Acroneuroptila =

Scientific classification
- Domain: Eukaryota
- Kingdom: Animalia
- Phylum: Arthropoda
- Class: Insecta
- Order: Orthoptera
- Suborder: Ensifera
- Family: Gryllidae
- Subfamily: Gryllomorphinae
- Tribe: Petaloptilini
- Genus: Acroneuroptila; Baccetti, 1960

Genus of crickets

External image
- Images at iNaturalist

Acroneuroptila is a genus of European crickets in the subfamily Gryllomorphinae and the tribe Petaloptilini, erected by B. Baccetti in 1960. The currently known distribution of species is limited to Sardinia.

== Species ==
The Orthoptera Species File lists:

1. Acroneuroptila puddui Cadeddu, 1970
2. Acroneuroptila sardoa Baccetti, 1960 - type species
