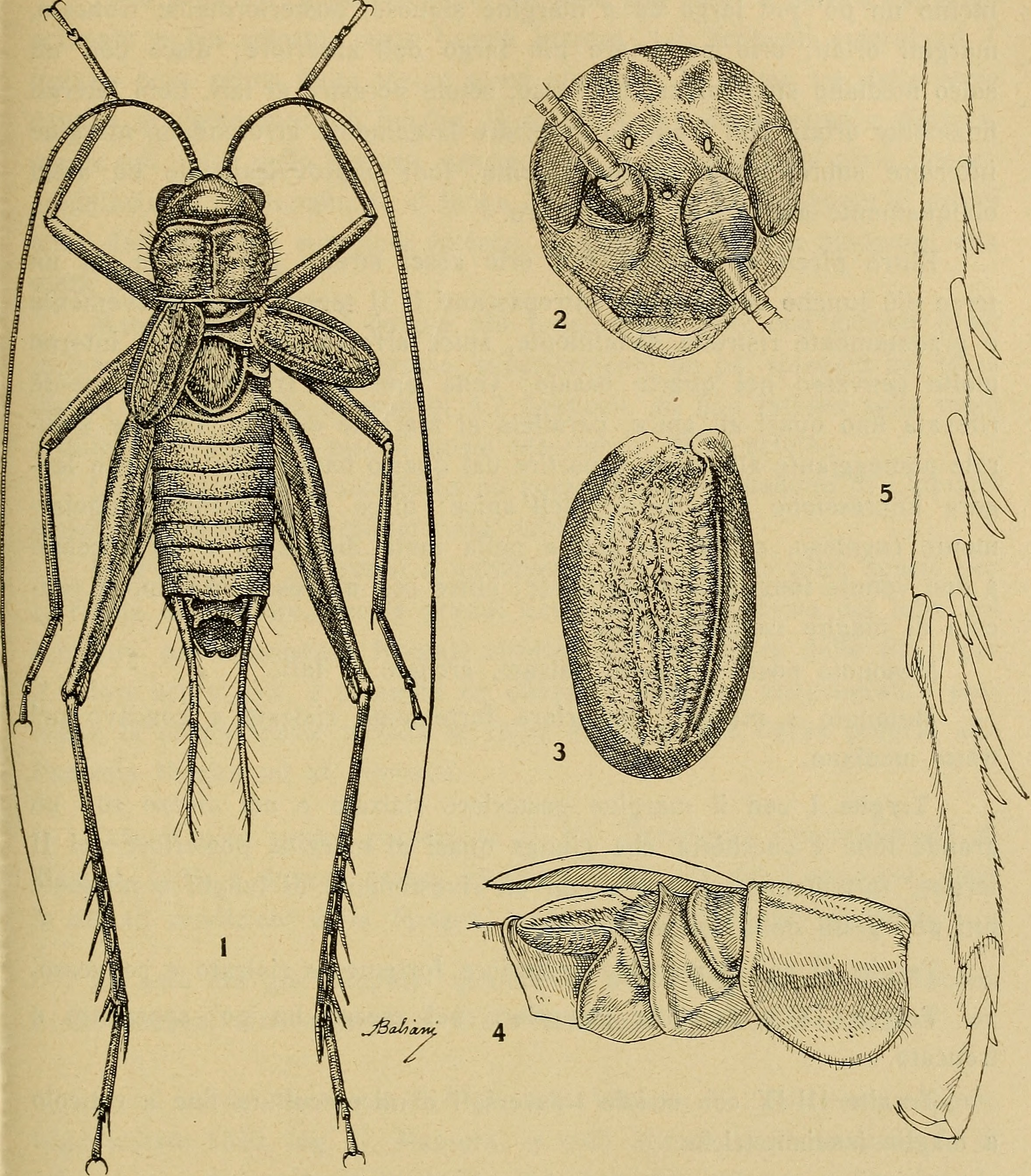

Scientific classification
- Domain: Eukaryota
- Kingdom: Animalia
- Phylum: Arthropoda
- Class: Insecta
- Order: Orthoptera
- Suborder: Ensifera
- Family: Gryllidae
- Subfamily: Gryllomorphinae
- Tribe: Petaloptilini
- Genus: Petaloptila; Pantel, 1890

Synonyms
- Discoptila Pantel, 1890

= Petaloptila =

Genus of crickets

External image
- Images at iNaturalist

Petaloptila is a genus of European crickets in the subfamily Gryllomorphinae and is typical of the tribe Petaloptilini; it was erected by Pantel in 1890. Species are mostly recorded from the European mainland (not Scandinavia or the British Isles).

== Species ==
The Orthoptera Species File lists:

subgenus Italoptila Gorochov & Llorente del Moral, 2001

1. Petaloptila andreinii Capra, 1937

subgenus Petaloptila Pantel, 1890

1. Petaloptila aliena (Brunner von Wattenwyl, 1882)
  - type species (as Gryllomorphus alienus Brunner von Wattenwyl)
2. Petaloptila clauseri (Schmidt, 1991)
3. Petaloptila fermini Gorochov & Llorente del Moral, 2001
4. Petaloptila fragosoi (Bolívar, 1885)
5. Petaloptila galaica Domingo, 2021
6. Petaloptila isabelae Gorochov & Llorente del Moral, 2001
7. Petaloptila pallescens Bolívar, 1927
8. Petaloptila pyrenaea Olmo-Vidal & Hernando, 2000
9. Petaloptila sbordonii (Baccetti, 1979)

subgenus Zapetaloptila Gorochov & Llorente del Moral, 2001

1. Petaloptila baenai Barranco, 2004
2. Petaloptila barrancoi Gorochov & Llorente del Moral, 2001
3. Petaloptila bolivari (Cazurro y Ruiz, 1888)
4. Petaloptila carabajali Barranco, 2004
5. Petaloptila llorenteae Barranco, 2004
6. Petaloptila malacitana Barranco, 2010
7. Petaloptila mogon Barranco, 2004
8. Petaloptila venosa Gorochov & Llorente del Moral, 2001
