= Glandulosa (insect) =

Scientific classification
- Domain: Eukaryota
- Kingdom: Animalia
- Phylum: Arthropoda
- Class: Insecta
- Order: Orthoptera
- Suborder: Ensifera
- Family: Gryllidae
- Subfamily: Gryllomorphinae
- Tribe: Petaloptilini
- Genus: Glandulosa; Harz, 1979

Genus of crickets

Glandulosa is a genus of European and Middle-eastern crickets in the subfamily Gryllomorphinae and the tribe Petaloptilini, erected by Kurt Harz in 1979. Species have been recorded from Turkey.

== Species ==
The Orthoptera Species File lists:

1. Glandulosa borisi Gorochov & Ünal, 2012
2. Glandulosa harzi Gorochov, 1996
3. Glandulosa kinzelbachi Harz, 1979
4. Glandulosa willemsei (Uvarov, 1934) - type species (as Gryllomorpha willemsei Uvarov, 1934)
