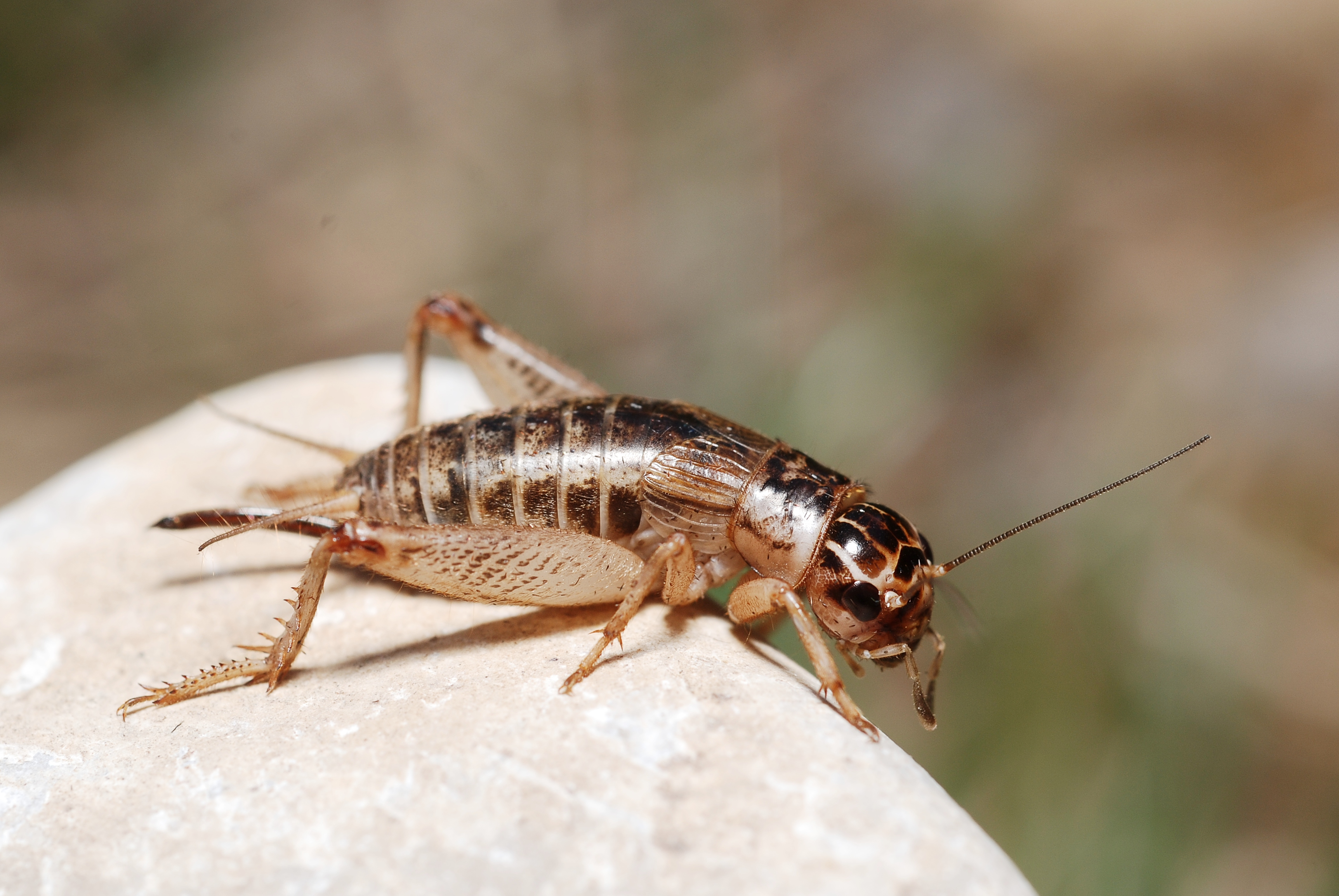
- Eugryllodes pipiens female

Scientific classification
- Domain: Eukaryota
- Kingdom: Animalia
- Phylum: Arthropoda
- Class: Insecta
- Order: Orthoptera
- Suborder: Ensifera
- Family: Gryllidae
- Subfamily: Gryllomorphinae
- Tribe: Gryllomorphini
- Genus: Eugryllodes; Chopard, 1927

Synonyms
- Eugryllus Hebard. 1935

= Eugryllodes =

Genus of crickets

External image
- Images at iNaturalist

Eugryllodes is a genus of Palaearctic crickets in the subfamily Gryllomorphinae and tribe Gryllomorphini, erected by Lucien Chopard in 1927. There is currently (2023) a very discontinuous recorded distribution of species that includes: Ghana, southern France and the Iberian Peninsula and Afghanistan.

== Species ==
The Orthoptera Species File lists:

1. Eugryllodes cruciger Chopard, 1968
2. Eugryllodes escalerae (Bolívar, 1894)
3. Eugryllodes littoreus (Bolívar, 1885)
4. Eugryllodes panteli (Cazurro y Ruiz, 1888)
5. Eugryllodes pipiens (Dufour, 1820) - subspecies:
  1. E. pipiens pipiens (Dufour, 1820) - type species (as Gryllus pipiens Dufour)
  2. E. pipiens valentinus (Bolívar, 1894)
6. Eugryllodes pomeroyi Chopard, 1927
