= Ovaliptila =

Scientific classification
- Kingdom: Animalia
- Phylum: Arthropoda
- Class: Insecta
- Order: Orthoptera
- Suborder: Ensifera
- Family: Gryllidae
- Subfamily: Gryllomorphinae
- Tribe: Petaloptilini
- Genus: Ovaliptila; Gorochov, 2006

Genus of crickets

External image
- Images at iNaturalist

Ovaliptila is a genus of European crickets in the subfamily Gryllomorphinae and the tribe Petaloptilini, erected by A.V. Gorochov in 2006. The known distribution – possibly incomplete – of species includes: the Balkans, Greece, Turkey and the Crimean peninsula.

== Species ==
The Orthoptera Species File lists:

1. Ovaliptila alanya Gorochov & Ünal, 2012 (2 subspecies)
2. Ovaliptila alara Gorochov & Ünal, 2012
3. Ovaliptila anamur Gorochov & Ünal, 2012
4. Ovaliptila anitli Gorochov & Ünal, 2012
5. Ovaliptila beroni (Popov, 1974)
6. Ovaliptila buresi (Maran, 1958) - type species (as Discoptila bureši Maran)
7. Ovaliptila ibrahimi Gorochov & Ünal, 2012
8. Ovaliptila kinzelbachi (Harz, 1971)
9. Ovaliptila krueperi (Pantel, 1890)
10. Ovaliptila lindbergi (Chopard, 1957)
11. Ovaliptila nana (Baccetti, 1992)
12. Ovaliptila newmanae (Harz, 1969)
13. Ovaliptila rhodos Gorochov & Alexiou, 2017
14. Ovaliptila teke Gorochov & Ünal, 2012
15. Ovaliptila wettsteini (Werner, 1934)
16. Ovaliptila willemsei (Karaman, 1975)
