= Jean Joseph Guieu =

- Born: 30 September 1758; Champcella, France
- Died: 5 October 1817 (aged 59) Châteauroux, France
- Allegiance: France
- Service years: 1774–1803
- Rank: General of Division
- Conflicts: French Revolutionary Wars; Battle of Boulou; Battle of the Black Mountain; Battle of Mondovì; Battle of Lonato; Battle of Arcole; Siege of Mantua; Battle of Tarvisio

Jean Joseph Guieu, also Jean Guyeux, (30 September 1758 – 5 October 1817) joined the French royal army and quickly rose in rank during the French Revolutionary Wars. He fought in the War of the Pyrenees against Spain and became a general officer. After transferring to Italy, he held important commands under Napoleon Bonaparte in the Italian campaign of 1796-1797. He retired from the army in 1803 and his surname is one of the Names inscribed under the Arc de Triomphe.

== Early career ==
Born at Champcella, Hautes-Alpes, France in 1758, Guieu enlisted in the French artillery in 1774. In 1791 he served as captain of a volunteer battalion in the Army of the Alps. Between 1793 and 1795 he fought under Pierre Augereau in the Army of the Eastern Pyrenees. On 4 October 1793, he was appointed colonel and on 25 December he was promoted general of brigade. From 29 April to 1 May 1794, he led a brigade under Augereau at the Battle of Boulou. He also fought at the Battle of the Black Mountain in November 1794. After the Peace of Basel with Spain in July 1795, he transferred to the Army of Italy.

== Italy ==
Guieu commanded a brigade in Jean Sérurier's division during the Montenotte Campaign in April 1796. During the action at San Michele Mondovi on 19 April, his brigade flanked the Sardinians out of position, though the Sardinians later drove the French back when they dispersed to plunder the village. During the Battle of Mondovì on 21 April, Guieu's brigade played a prominent role and helped capture the village of Vicoforte.

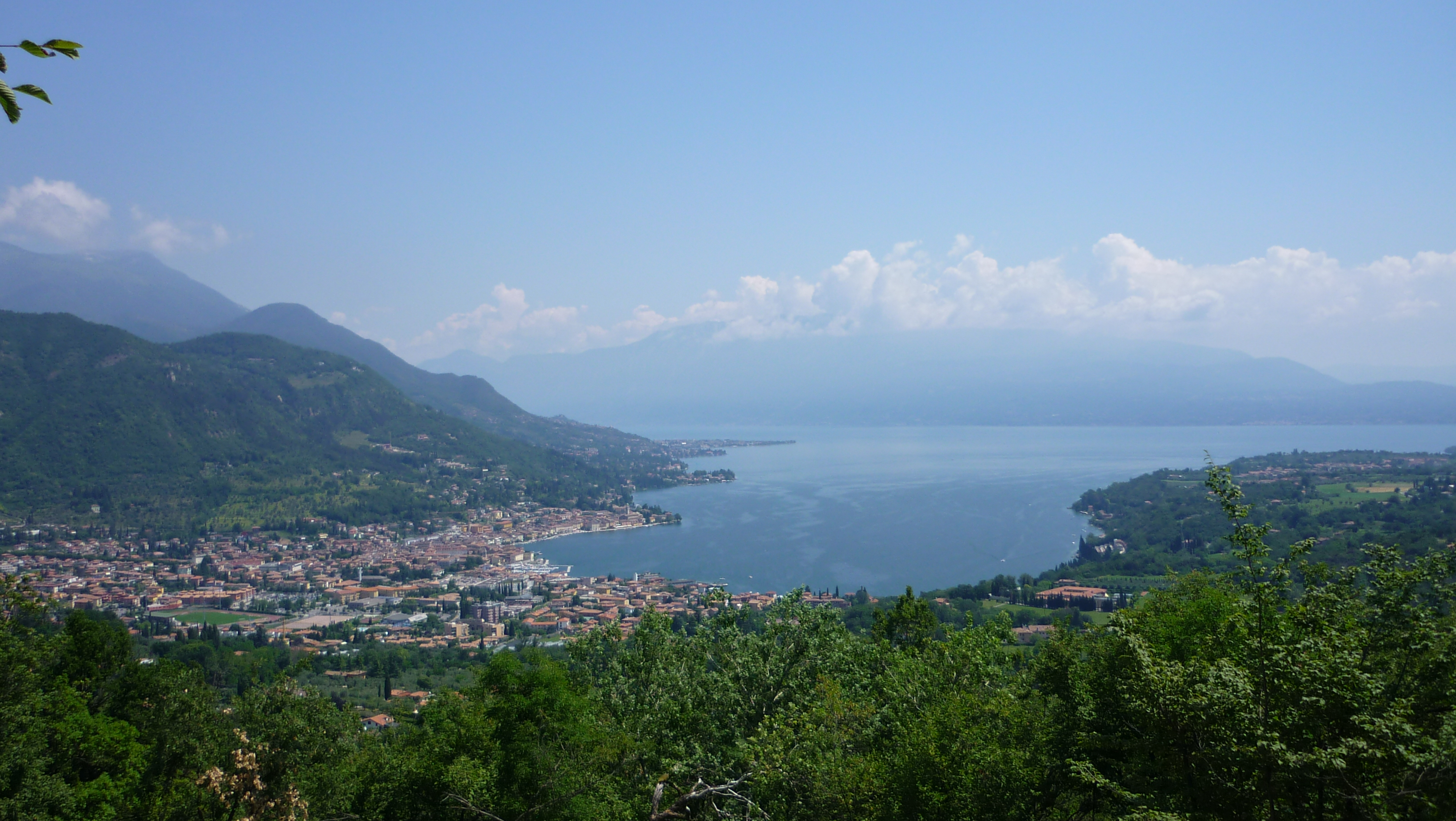
Guieu fought Austrians at Salò on Lake Garda.

During the first Austrian attempt to relieve the Siege of Mantua, Guieu led a brigade in Pierre Sauret's division. Surprised by the attack of Peter Ott on 29 July, Guieu rallied 400 men and withdrew to the Palazzo Martinengo in the village of Salò. Though without food, Guieu withstood a siege by Joseph Ocskay's brigade until the 31st, when Sauret drove the Austrians away after a sharp action. During the Battle of Lonato on 3 August, Guieu led Sauret's division when the latter was injured. He recaptured Salò and attacked Gavardo from the east. Though driven back on Salò, he held his ground. The presence of a French division so close to the Austrian line of retreat helped Peter Quasdanovich make up his mind to withdraw in the early hours of 4 August.

On the first day of the Battle of Arcola, Bonaparte ordered Guieu to take the 18th and 25th Demi-Brigades across the Adige River at a ferry near Albaredo d'Adige. Guieu successfully carried out this assignment and drove the Austrians out of Arcole late on the evening of 15 November. Bonaparte later withdrew the troops and the village had to be fought over on the following two days. On 6 December, Guieu received promotion to general of division. In March 1797, he led a division in driving the Austrian army out of northeast Italy, fighting at Sacile and seizing Palmanova. He helped André Masséna and Sérurier trap the division of Adam Bajalics near Tarvisio.

== Later career ==
Guieu's active service ended in 1799 and retirement from the army followed in 1803. He died at Châteauroux in 1817. The name GUYEUX is inscribed on the 24th column of the Arc de Triomphe in Paris.
