= Ovaliptila willemsei =

Conservation status
- Least Concern (IUCN 3.1)

Scientific classification
- Kingdom: Animalia
- Phylum: Arthropoda
- Class: Insecta
- Order: Orthoptera
- Suborder: Ensifera
- Family: Gryllidae
- Genus: Ovaliptila
- Species: O. willemsei

Binomial name
- Ovaliptila willemsei (Karaman, 1975)

Synonyms
- Discoptila willemsei Karaman, 1975

Species of cricket

Ovaliptila willemsei, also known as the Montenegrin glandular cricket, is a species of cricket found in the Balkans.

== Distribution ==
This species is endemic to Albania, Bosnia and Herzegovina and Montenegro.
