= Franz Ocskay =

Hungarian entomologist

Franz Ocskay von Ocskö (1775–1851) was a Hungarian entomologist. Freiherr Franz L. B. Ocskay was the son of Major-General Joseph Ocskay von Ocsko (1740–1805). He lived in Sopron (Ödenburg). Franz Ocskay described several new species of grasshoppers.

== Works ==
- 1826 Gryllorum Hungariae indigenorum species aliquot. Acta Acad. Leopold. Carol. (Halle) 13(1): 407–410.
- 1832 Orthoptera nova. Acta Acad. Leopold. Carol. (Halle) 16(2): 959–962.
- 1844 Über den Standort seltener Insecten. Amtl. Bericht Naturf. Ges. Gräz 4: 181.
- 1850 Toussaint von Charpentier's letzte Insektenabbildung. Acta Acad. Leopold. Carol. (Halle) 20(2): 6 Seiten. (with Johann Ludwig Christian Gravenhorst and Christian Gottfried Daniel Nees von Esenbeck).
