= Champcella =

- Commune
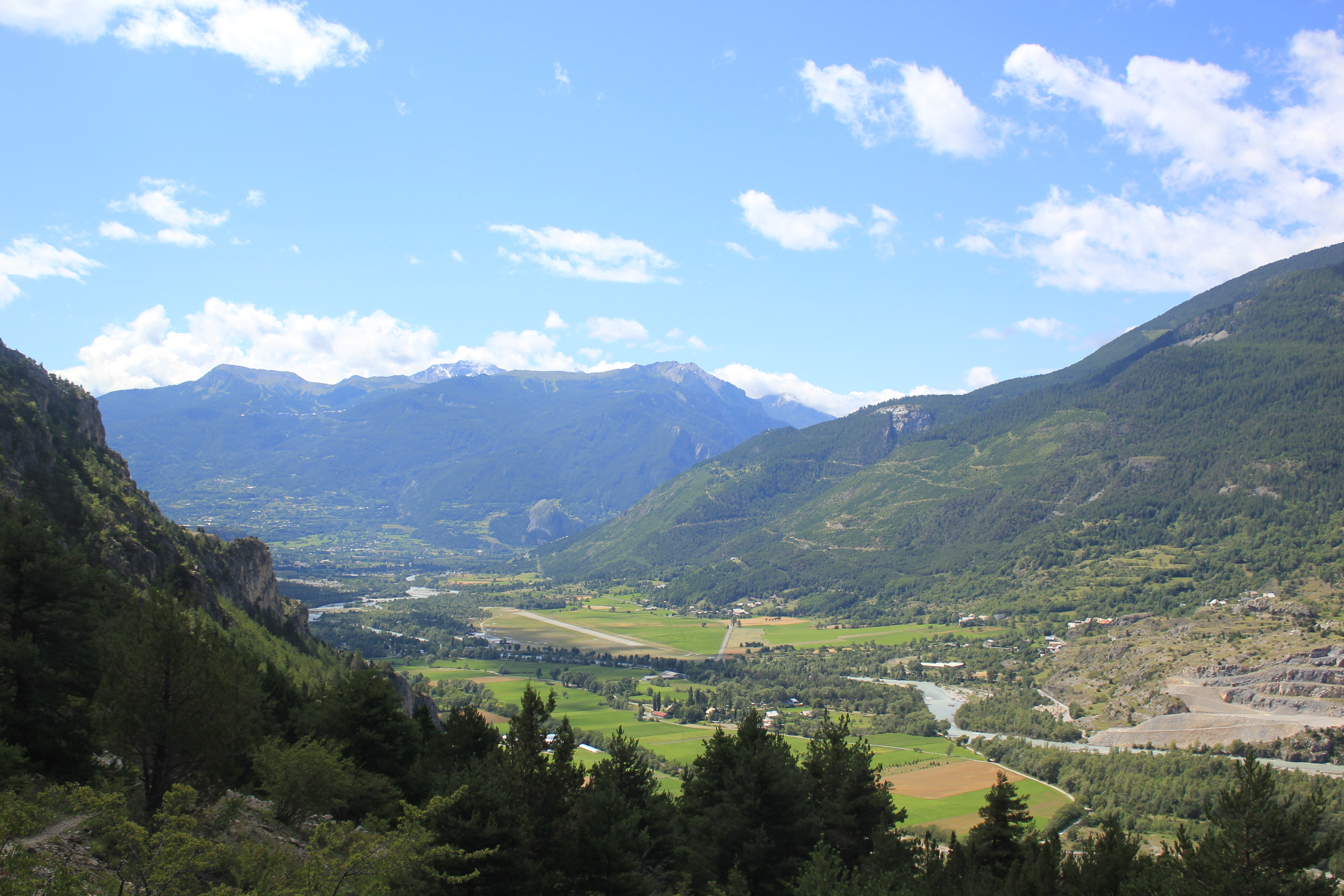

- Coat of arms
- Location of Champcella
- Location within France Location within Provence-Alpes-Côte d'Azur
- Coordinates: 44°43′25″N 6°34′20″E
- Country: France
- Region: Provence-Alpes-Côte d'Azur
- Department: Hautes-Alpes
- Arrondissement: Briançon
- Canton: L'Argentière-la-Bessée
- Intercommunality: Pays des Écrins

Government
  - Mayor (2026–32): Jacques Pons
- Area^{1}: 30.25 km^{2} (11.68 sq mi)
- Elevation: 1,150 m (3,770 ft)
- Highest elevation: 3,156 m (10,354 ft)
- Lowest elevation: 900 m (3,000 ft)
- Population (2023): 181
  - Density: 5.98/km^{2} (15.5/sq mi)
- Time zone: UTC+01:00 (CET)
  - Summer (DST): UTC+02:00 (CEST)
- INSEE/Postal code: 05031 /05310
- ^{1} French Land Register data, which excludes lakes, ponds, glaciers > 1 km^{2} (0.386 sq mi or 247 acres) and river estuaries.

Champcella (French pronunciation: [ʃɑ̃sɛla]; Occitan: Champcelat) is a commune in the Hautes-Alpes department in southeastern France.

== Population ==
Historical population
Year	Pop.	±% p.a.
1968	197	—
1975	153	−3.55%
1982	147	−0.57%
1990	156	+0.75%
1999	142	−1.04%
2007	164	+1.82%
2012	177	+1.54%
2017	188	+1.21%
2023	181	−0.63%
Source: INSEE

== See also ==
- Communes of the Hautes-Alpes department
