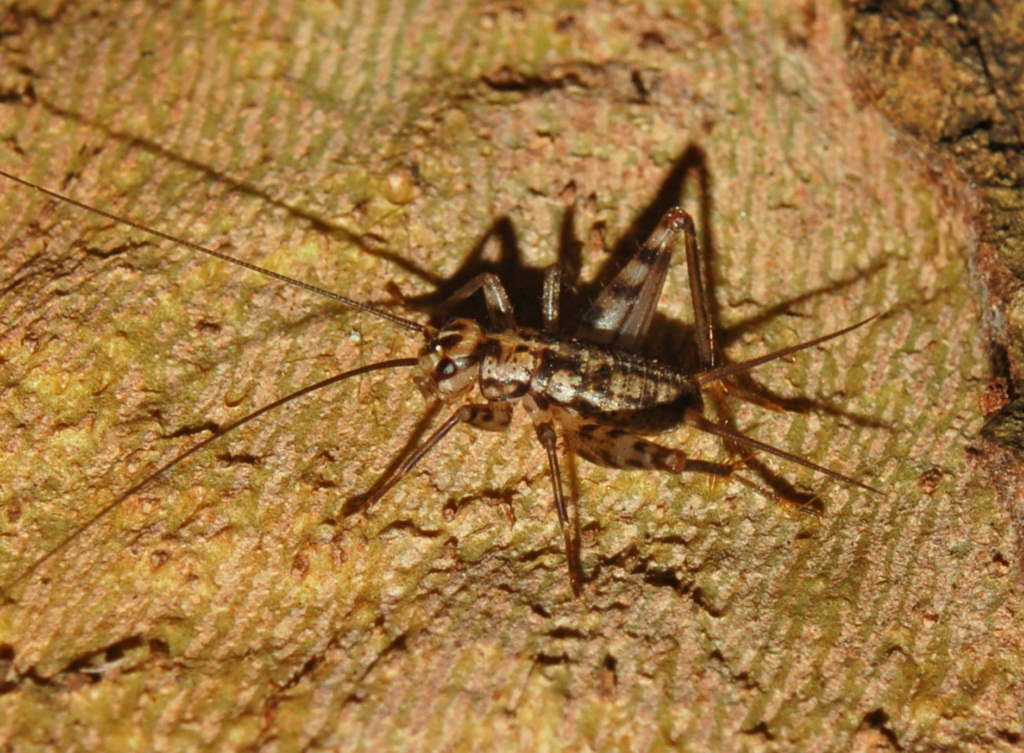
- Gryllomorpha dalmatina

Scientific classification
- Domain: Eukaryota
- Kingdom: Animalia
- Phylum: Arthropoda
- Class: Insecta
- Order: Orthoptera
- Suborder: Ensifera
- Family: Gryllidae
- Tribe: Gryllomorphini
- Genus: Gryllomorpha; Fieber, 1853

Synonyms
- Gryllomorphus Saussure, 1877

= Gryllomorpha =

Genus of crickets

Gryllomorpha is a genus of cricket belonging to the family Gryllidae subfamily Gryllomorphinae. The species of this genus are present in Europe, in North Africa and in Central Asia.

== Species ==
The Orthoptera Species File lists:

subgenus Gryllomorpha (Gryllomorpha) Fieber, 1853

1. Gryllomorpha algerica Chopard, 1943
2. Gryllomorpha brevicauda Bolívar, 1914
3. Gryllomorpha bruehli Gorochov, 1993
4. Gryllomorpha dalmatina (Ocskay, 1832) - type species (as Acheta dalmatina Ocskay = G. dalmatina dalmatina, one of 5 subspecies)
5. Gryllomorpha fusca Chopard, 1943
6. Gryllomorpha gestroana Bolívar, 1914
7. Gryllomorpha gracilipes Chopard, 1943
8. Gryllomorpha longicauda (Rambur, 1838)
9. Gryllomorpha macrocephala Chopard, 1943
10. Gryllomorpha maghzeni Bolívar, 1905
11. Gryllomorpha minima Werner, 1914
12. Gryllomorpha monodi Chopard, 1943
13. Gryllomorpha occidentalis Gorochov, 2009
14. Gryllomorpha rufescens Uvarov, 1924
15. Gryllomorpha rungsi Chopard, 1943
16. Gryllomorpha sovetica Gorochov, 2009
17. Gryllomorpha sublaevis Chopard, 1943
18. Gryllomorpha syriaca Harz, 1979

subgenus Gryllomorphella Gorochov, 1984

1. Gryllomorpha albanica Ebner, 1910
2. Gryllomorpha antalya Gorochov, 2009
3. Gryllomorpha atlas Gorochov, 2009
4. Gryllomorpha canariensis Chopard, 1939
5. Gryllomorpha mira Gorochov, 1993
6. Gryllomorpha miramae Medvedev, 1933
7. Gryllomorpha robusta Gorochov, 2009
8. Gryllomorpha segregata Gorochov, 2009
9. Gryllomorpha sternlichti Chopard, 1963
10. Gryllomorpha uclensis Pantel, 1890
11. Gryllomorpha zonata Bolívar, 1914

subgenus Hymenoptila Chopard, 1943

1. Gryllomorpha lanzarotensis (Kevan & Hsiung, 1992)
2. Gryllomorpha panteli (Bolívar, 1914)
3. Gryllomorpha rotundipennis (Chopard, 1939)
4. Gryllomorpha zernyi Werner, 1934
