= Dubovany =

- Municipality
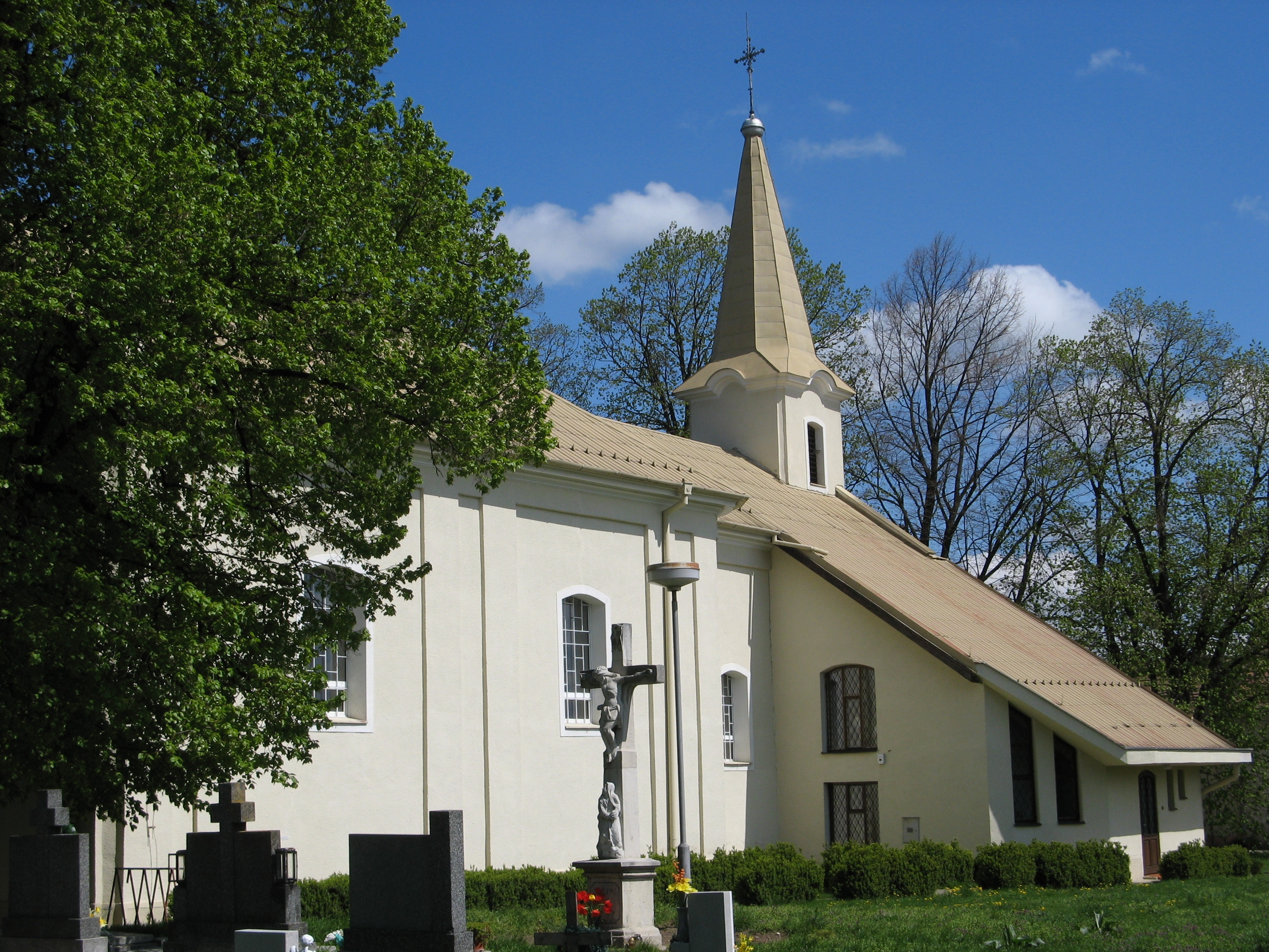
- Church in Dubovany

- Flag

- Location of Dubovany in the Trnava Region Location of Dubovany in Slovakia
- Coordinates: 48.53°N 17.73°E
- Country: Slovakia
- Region: Trnava Region
- District: Piešťany District
- First mentioned: 1278

Area
  - Total: 11.33 km^{2} (4.37 sq mi)
- Elevation: 154 m (505 ft)

Population (2025)
  - Total: 1,095
- Time zone: UTC+1 (CET)
  - Summer (DST): UTC+2 (CEST)
- Postal code: 922 08
- Area code: +421 33
- Vehicle registration plate (until 2022): PN
- Website: www.dubovany.sk

Dubovany (Hungarian: Dubovány) is a village and municipality in Piešťany District in the Trnava Region of western Slovakia.

== History ==
In historical records the village was first certainly mentioned in 1279 as Luchunch, earlier 1113 the charters of the Zobor Abbey refer to villa Lucinci.

== Geography ==
The municipality lies at an altitude of 154 metres (505 ft) and covers an area of 11.33 km^{2} (4.37 sq mi) (2025).

== Population ==
Population statistic (10 years)
Year	1995	2005	2015	2025
Count	886	932	1027	1095
Difference		+5.19%	+10.19%	+6.62%

Population statistic
Year	2024	2025
Count	1107	1095
Difference		−1.08%

It has a population of 1095 people (31 December 2025).

=== Ethnicity ===
Census 2021 (1+ %)
Ethnicity	Number	Fraction
Slovak	1033	96.9%
Not found out	25	2.34%
Total	1066	

In year 2021 was 1066 people by ethnicity 1033 as Slovak, 25 as Not found out, 7 as Other, 4 as Ukrainian, 4 as Hungarian, 2 as Czech, 2 as Croatian, 1 as Irish, 1 as Serbian, 1 as Romani and 1 as Russian.

Note on population: The difference values of population numbers in the table "Population statistic" and in the sections "Ethnicity" & "Religion" is caused by the use of various statistical methods.

=== Religion ===
Census 2021 (1+ %)
Religion	Number	Fraction
Roman Catholic Church	815	76.45%
None	167	15.67%
Not found out	38	3.56%
Evangelical Church	21	1.97%
Total	1066	

In year 2021 was 1066 people by religion 815 from Roman Catholic Church, 167 from None, 38 from Not found out, 21 from Evangelical Church, 7 from Eastern Orthodox Church, 4 from Other, 4 from Apostolic Church, 3 from Greek Catholic Church, 2 from Buddhism, 1 from Other and not ascertained christian church, 1 from Christian Congregations in Slovakia, 1 from Islam, 1 from United Methodist Church and 1 from Ad hoc movements.

== Genealogical resources ==
The records for genealogical research are available at the state archive "Statny Archiv in Bratislava, Slovakia"

- Lutheran church records (births/marriages/deaths): 1783-1922 (parish B)

== See also ==
- List of municipalities and towns in Slovakia
