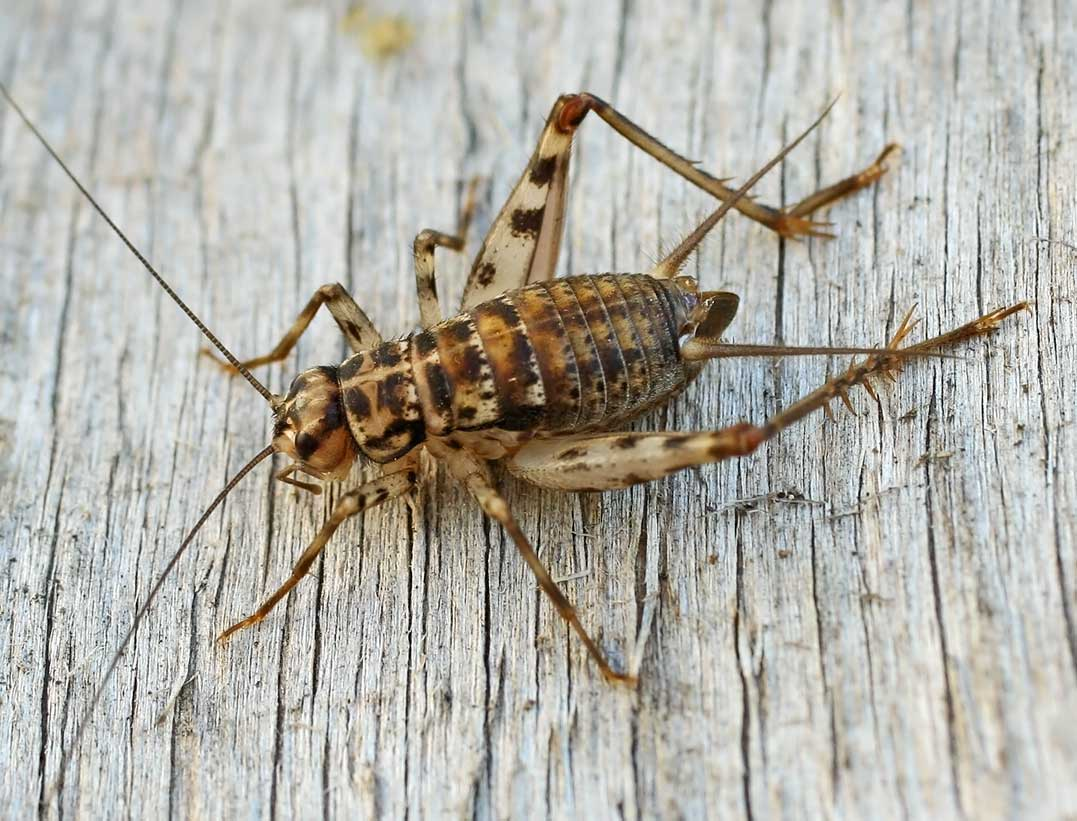
- Gryllomorpha dalmatina

Scientific classification
- Domain: Eukaryota
- Kingdom: Animalia
- Phylum: Arthropoda
- Class: Insecta
- Order: Orthoptera
- Suborder: Ensifera
- Superfamily: Grylloidea
- Family: Gryllidae
- Subfamily: Gryllomorphinae; Saussure, 1877

Synonyms
- Gryllomorphites Saussure, 1877; Petaloptilae Baccetti, 1960

= Gryllomorphinae =

Subfamily of Crickets

The Gryllomorphinae are a subfamily of crickets (Orthoptera: Ensifera) based on the type genus Gryllomorpha. Species have been recorded from: North Africa and the western Palaearctic (mainland).

== Tribes and Genera ==
The Orthoptera Species File includes two tribes:

=== Gryllomorphini ===
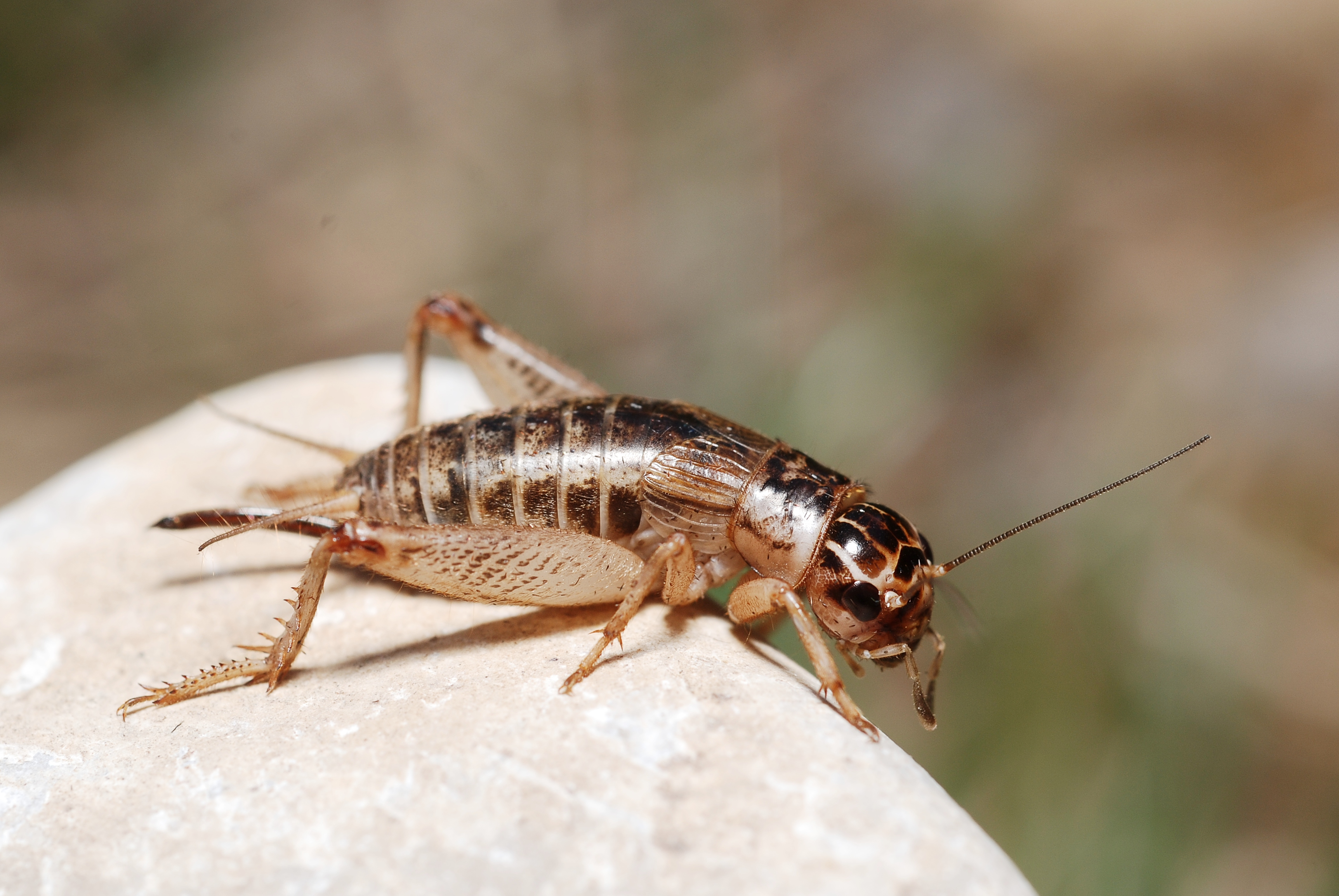
Eugryllodes pipiens female

Auth. Saussure, 1877

1. Eugryllodes Chopard, 1927
2. Gryllomorpha Fieber, 1853

=== Petaloptilini ===
Auth. Baccetti, 1960

1. Acroneuroptila Baccetti, 1960
2. Glandulosa Harz, 1979
3. Ovaliptila Gorochov, 2006
4. Petaloptila Pantel, 1890
