= Philipp von Stadion und Thannhausen =

Austrian General

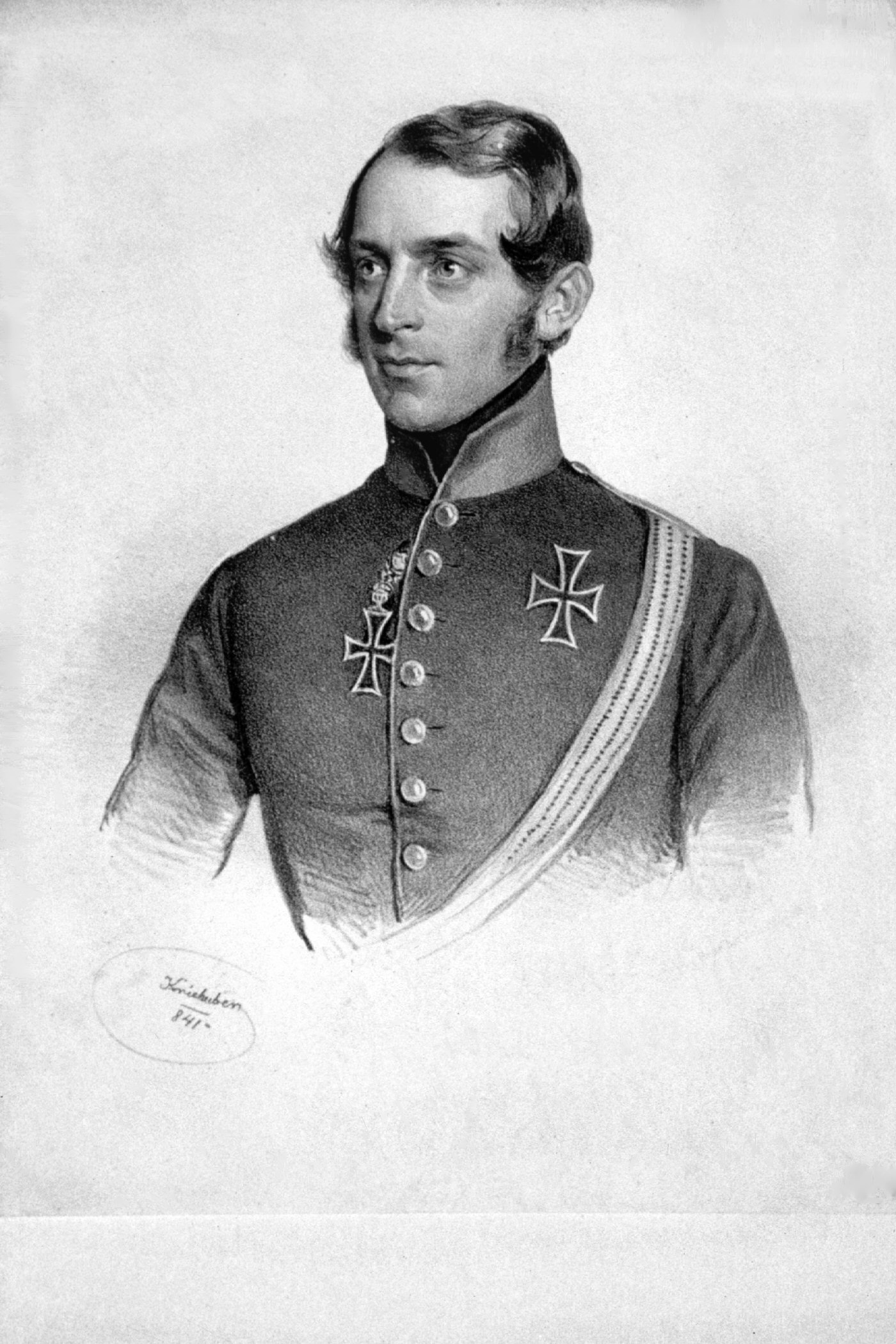
- Stadion, c. 1840
- Born: 9 May 1799
- Died: 19 March 1868 (aged 68); Vienna, Austria-Hungary
- Burial place: Matzleinsdorf Protestant Cemetery Vienna, Austria
- Military career
- Allegiance: Bavaria ( ? – 1823); Austrian Empire (1823–1863)
- Branch: Bavarian Army ( ? – 1823); Austrian Army (1823–1863)
- Service years: ? – 1863
- Rank: Feldmarschall-Leutnant
- Commands: V Army Corps
- Conflicts: First Italian War of Independence; Battle of Novara; Second Italian War of Independence; Battle of Montebello; Battle of Solferino
- Awards: Commander's Cross of the Order of Leopold; Order of the Iron Crown Second Class; Order of the Iron Crown First Class

Philipp Franz Emerich Karl von Stadion (9 May 1799 – 19 March 1868 in Vienna) was an Austrian feldmarschall-leutnant (lieutenant field marshal) and Landkomtur (National Commander) of the Teutonic Order in Austria.

== Biography ==
=== Ancestry ===
Philipp was born as a member of the noble Stadion family and was a son of Count Emerich Joseph Philipp von Stadion-Thannhausen (14 December 1766 – 11 January 1817) and Countess Charlotte Marie von der Leyen und zu Hohengeroldseck (4 April 1768 – 12 January 1832). Not to be confused with the von Thannhausen family.

=== Military career ===
After early military service in the Bavarian Army, Stadion joined the Austrian Empire′s Cuirassier Regiment No. 1 in 1823 with the rank of leutnant (lieutenant). In 1830 he transferred at the rank of oberleutnant to become adjutant to the infantry regiment Fürst Alois Liechtenstein No. 12. In January 1834 he served in a squadron of Uhlan Regiment No. 1, where he was promoted to major in 1839. In the same year he became wing adjutant to Emperor Ferdinand I of Austria and rose in this position in 1842 to oberstleutnant (lieutenant colonel). Appointed Colonel Treasurer of the Emperor in 1845, he moved to Schwarzenberg Uhlan Regiment No. 2, where he was promoted to oberst (colonel).

In July 1848 during the First Italian War of Independence (1848–1849), Stadion took over a patrol column as part of the division of Archduke Ernest of Austria and was commissioned, in association with the brigade of General von Hahne, to disperse the followers of Giuseppe Garibaldi. In January 1849 he was promoted to generalmajor (major general) and took over a brigade under Feldmarschal (Field Marshal) Joseph Radetzky von Radetz in northern Italy. He took part in the Battle of Novara on 23 March 1849, in which he was seriously wounded. He received the Commander's Cross of the Order of Leopold and the Order of the Iron Crown Second Class for his service in the war.

On 26 October 1852 Stadion was promoted to feldmarschall-leutnant (lieutenant field marshal) and took command of a division of the VIII Army Corps. In 1855 he was appointed commanding general of the V Army Corps and in 1856 to the Geheimrat (Privy Council).

With the V Army Corps Stadion participated in the Second Italian War of Independence in 1859 against the French-Sardinian coalition in Lombardy. Together with his chief of staff, Colonel Josef Freiherr von Ringelsheim, his troops fought in the opening battle — the Battle of Montebello, on 20 May 1859 — and after retreating from that battlefield he fell back to the bridgehead at Vacarezza. In the Battle of Solferino on 24 June 1859, his troops were concentrated in the center, where they succumbed despite putting up a steadfast defense against the French. Emperor Franz Joseph I of Austria honored him with the Order of the Iron Crown First Class including war decoration.

After the death of Archduke John of Austria in May 1859, Stadion succeeded John as inhaber (proprietor) of Dragoon Regiment No. 1, which was later renamed the 9th Cuirassier Regiment. In 1863 he retired as a cavalry general and in 1867 was appointed Landkomtur (National Commander) of the Teutonic Order in Austria. He died in Vienna in 1868 at the age of 69 and was buried there in the Matzleinsdorf Protestant Cemetery.

== Awards and honors ==
- Commander's Cross of the Order of Leopold
- Order of the Iron Crown Second Class
- Order of the Iron Crown First Class with war decoration
