= Jonathan Parry =

British historian (born 1957)

Jonathan Philip Parry
- Born: 1957 (age 68–69)
- Other name: Jon Parry
- Occupation: Historian

Academic background
- Education: Peterhouse, Cambridge
- Academic advisor: Derek Beales

Academic work
- Discipline: History
- Sub-discipline: Modern British history
- Institutions: University of Cambridge

Jonathan Philip Parry (born 1957), commonly referred to as Jon Parry, is emeritus professor of Modern British History at the University of Cambridge and Emeritus Fellow of Pembroke College. He has specialised in 19th and 20th century British political and cultural history and has developed a later interest in the relationship between Britain and the Ottoman Empire.

Parry was born in 1957. He was educated at Dover Grammar School for Boys before matriculating at Peterhouse, Cambridge, in 1975, subsequently becoming a Fellow of that college before moving to Pembroke College in 1992. In 2009 he was appointed as a professor in the university's history faculty.

Parry was for some time the Director of the Isaac Newton Trust, a post that he relinquished in 2015 when he took academic leave. He was President of Pembroke College in 2018–2019.

A revised version of Parry's PhD thesis, which had been supervised by Derek Beales, was published in 1986 as Democracy and Religion: Gladstone and the Liberal Party 1867-1875. A review of this noted that Parry was from a similar school of thought as Maurice Cowling, another Petrean don of whom he later wrote various posthumous accounts.

The scholarly literature on British historiography includes Parry as a leader of the Cambridge school of modern politics, as shown by Alex Middleton in 2021.

A festschrift was published in Parry's honour in October 2024, a year after his retirement, titled Culture, Thought and Belief in British Political Life since 1800: Essays in Honour of Jonathan Parry. Edited by Paul Readman and Geraint Thomas, the contributors included David Cannadine, Michael Bentley and Boyd Hilton.

== Works ==
- Liberalism (Short Histories; Agenda, 2025)
- Promised Lands: The British and the Ottoman Middle East (Princeton, 2022)
- The Politics of Patriotism: English Liberalism, National Identity and Europe 1830-1886 (Cambridge, 2006)
- The Rise and Fall of Liberal Government in Victorian Britain (Yale, 1993)
- Democracy and Religion: Gladstone and the Liberal Party, 1867-1875 (Cambridge, 1986)
- Benjamin Disraeli (Oxford, 2007)
- 'Disraeli, the East and Religion: Tancred in Context', English Historical Review (2017)
- 'Disraeli and England', Historical Journal (2000)
- Institutions, Individuals and Modern British History: Essays in Honour of Sir David Cannadine (ed.) (Woodbridge, 2025)
- 'The Third Earl Grey, Liberalism and the British Empire', Modern Intellectual History (2024)
- ‘Gladstone’s First Government: A Policy Overview’, Journal of Liberal History (2018–19)
- 'The Decline of Institutional Reform in Nineteenth-Century Britain', in Structures and Transformations in Modern British History, ed. D . Feldman and J. Lawrence (Cambridge, 2011)
- 'Whig Monarchy, Whig Nation: Crown, Politics and Representativeness, 1880-2000', in The Monarchy and the British Nation, 1780 to the present, ed. A. Olechnowicz (Cambridge, 2007)
- 'The Impact of Napoleon III on British Politics, 1851-1880', Transactions of the Royal Historical Society (2001)
