= List of rulers of Galicia and Lodomeria =

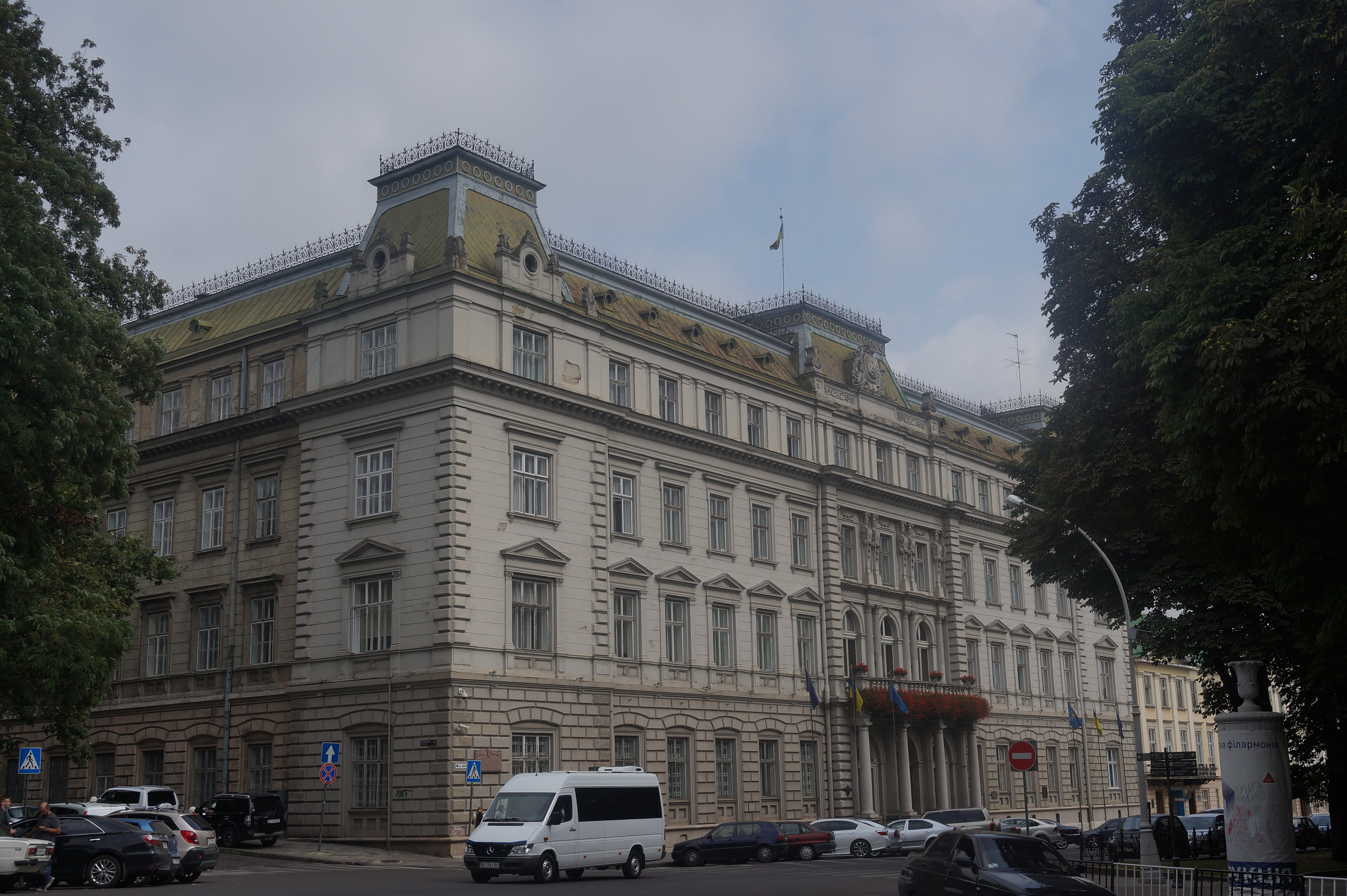
The Government House in Lviv, Ukraine was the residence of the governors

The Kingdom of Galicia and Lodomeria, a state under the Habsburg monarchy from 1772 to 1918, was ruled by several governors (later referred to by the title of statthalter) from the First Partition of Poland in 1772 until the dissolution of Austria-Hungary upon the conclusion of World War I in 1918. During this period, Galicia and Lodomeria was at first directly subordinate to the emperor of Austria and the government in Vienna before later being governed by the Diet of Galicia and Lodomeria based in Lemberg (modern-day Lviv, Ukraine).

== Governors ==
No.	Portrait	Name (Birth–Death)	Term	Monarch
1	Portrait of count Johann Anton von Pergen	Count; Johann Anton von Pergen (1725–1814)	September 1772 – January 1774	Maria Theresa (1740–1780)
2	Portrait of count András Hadik	Count; András Hadik (1710–1790)	January 1774 – June 1774	Maria Theresa (1740–1780)
3	Portrait of Prince Heinrich Joseph Johann von Auersperg	Prince; Heinrich Joseph Johann von Auersperg (1697–1783)	June 1774 – June 1780	Maria Theresa (1740–1780)
4		Count; Josef Brigido (1733–1817)	June 1780 – October 1794	Maria Theresa (1740–1780)
4		Count; Josef Brigido (1733–1817)	June 1780 – October 1794	Joseph II (1780–1790)
4		Count; Josef Brigido (1733–1817)	June 1780 – October 1794	Leopold II (1790–1792)
4		Count; Josef Brigido (1733–1817)	June 1780 – October 1794	Francis I (1792–1835)
5	Portrait of Count József Majláth	Count; József Majláth de Székhely (1737–1810)	October 1794 – July 1795	Francis I (1792–1835)
6	Personal coat of arms of Johann Gaisruck	Count; Johann Gaisruck (1739–1801)	October 1794 – July 1795	Francis I (1792–1835)
—		Josef von Sweerts-Sporck (1756–1823)	February 1801 – August 1801 (Note: Acting.)	Francis I (1792–1835)
7	Portrait of József Ürményi	Baron; József Ürményi (1741–1822)	September 1801 – July 1806	Francis I (1792–1835)
—		Christian Wurmser (1769–1844)	July 1806 – March 1809	Francis I (1792–1835)
8	Portrait of Peter von Goëss	Count; Peter von Goëss (1774–1846)	March 1810 – April 1815	Francis I (1792–1835)
—		Baron; Georg Oechsner (1757–1829)	April 1815 – July 1815	Francis I (1792–1835)
9		Baron; Joseph von Hauer (1778–1863)	August 1815 – November 1822 (Note: Acting to September 1817.)	Francis I (1792–1835)
10		Count; Ludwig Taaffe (1791–1855)	November 1822 – August 1826	Francis I (1792–1835)
Office renamed to Statthalter				Francis I (1792–1835)
11	Portrait of Prince August Longin von Lobkowitz	Prince; August Longin von Lobkowitz (1797–1842)	August 1826 – September 1832	Francis I (1792–1835)
12	Portrait of Archduke Ferdinand Karl Joseph von Habsburg-Este	Archduke; Ferdinand Karl Joseph von Habsburg-Este (1781–1850)	September 1832 – 2 July 1846	Francis I (1792–1835)
12	Portrait of Archduke Ferdinand Karl Joseph von Habsburg-Este	Archduke; Ferdinand Karl Joseph von Habsburg-Este (1781–1850)	September 1832 – 2 July 1846	Ferdinand I 1835–1848
—	Portrait of Baron Franz Krieg von Hochfelden	Baron; Franz Krieg von Hochfelden (1776–1856)	July 1846 – August 1847	Ferdinand I 1835–1848
13	Portrait of Count Franz Stadion von Warthausen und Thannhausen	Count; Franz Stadion von Warthausen und Thannhausen (1776–1856)	1 August 1847 – June 1848	Ferdinand I 1835–1848
14	Portrait of Baron Wilhelm Friedrich von Hammerstein	Baron; Wilhelm Friedrich von Hammerstein (1785–1861)	June 1848 – July 1848	Ferdinand I 1835–1848
—	Portrait of Count Agenor Romuald Gołuchowski	Count; Agenor Romuald Gołuchowski (1812–1875)	Unknown	Ferdinand I 1835–1848
15	Portrait of Wacław Michał Zaleski	Baronet Wacław Michał Zaleski (1799–1849)	30 July 1848 – 15 January 1849	Ferdinand I 1835–1848
15	Portrait of Wacław Michał Zaleski	Baronet Wacław Michał Zaleski (1799–1849)	30 July 1848 – 15 January 1849	Franz Joseph I (1848–1916)
16	Portrait of Count Agenor Romuald Gołuchowski	Count; Agenor Romuald Gołuchowski (1812–1875)	15 January 1849 – 13 December 1859	Franz Joseph I (1848–1916)
—	Portrait of Baron Josef Kalchegger von Kalchberg	Baron; Josef Kalchegger von Kalchberg (1801–1882)	1859 – 1860	Franz Joseph I (1848–1916)
—		Karl Mosch	1860 – 1861	Franz Joseph I (1848–1916)
17	Portrait of Count Alexander von Mensdorff-Pouilly, Prince Dietrichstein von Nicolsburg	Count; Alexander Mensdorff-Pouilly; Prince Dietrichstein von Nicolsburg (1812–1875)	1861 – 27 October 1864	Franz Joseph I (1848–1916)
18		Baron; Franz von Paumgartten (1811–1866)	1864 – 19 October 1866	Franz Joseph I (1848–1916)
(16)	Portrait of Count Agenor Romuald Gołuchowski	Count; Agenor Romuald Gołuchowski (1812–1875)	20 October 1866 – 7 October 1867	Franz Joseph I (1848–1916)
—		Baron; Ludwik Possinger-Choborski (1823–1905)	1867 – 1871	Franz Joseph I (1848–1916)
(16)	Portrait of Count Agenor Romuald Gołuchowski	Count; Agenor Romuald Gołuchowski (1812–1875)	20 July 1871 – 3 August 1875 (Note: Died in office.)	Franz Joseph I (1848–1916)
19	Portrait of Count Alfred Józef Potocki	Count; Alfred Józef Potocki (1812–1875)	24 November 1875 – 10 August 1883	Franz Joseph I (1848–1916)
20	Portrait of Baronet Filip Zaleski	Baronet; Filip Zaleski (1836–1911)	10 August 1883 – September 1888	Franz Joseph I (1848–1916)
21	Portrait of Count Kasimir Felix Badeni	Count; Kasimir Felix Badeni (1846–1909)	October 1888 – September 1895	Franz Joseph I (1848–1916)
22	Portrait of Prince Eustachy Stanisław Sanguszko	Prince; Eustachy Stanisław Sanguszko (1842–1903)	25 September 1895 – March 1898	Franz Joseph I (1848–1916)
23	Portrait of Count Leon Piniński	Count; Leon Piniński (1857–1938)	31 March 1898 – June 1903	Franz Joseph I (1848–1916)
24	Portrait of Count Andrzej Kazimierz Potocki	Count; Andrzej Kazimierz Potocki (1861–1908)	8 June 1903 – 12 April 1908	Franz Joseph I (1848–1916)
25	Portrait of Michał Bobrzyński	Michał Bobrzyński (1849–1935)	28 April 1908 – 14 May 1913	Franz Joseph I (1848–1916)
26	Portrait of Witold Korytowski	Witold Korytowski (1850–1923)	14 May 1913 – 20 August 1915 (Note: In exile from September 1914 due to Russian occupation during World War I.)	Franz Joseph I (1848–1916)
27	Portrait of Hermann von Colard	Hermann von Colard (1850–1916)	August 1915 – 8 April 1916	Franz Joseph I (1848–1916)
28	Portrait of Erich von Diller	Erich von Diller (1859–1926)	April 1916 – March 1917 (Note: In exile from 4 October 1916 due to Russian occupation during World War I.)	Franz Joseph I (1848–1916)
28	Portrait of Erich von Diller	Erich von Diller (1859–1926)	April 1916 – March 1917	Charles I 1916–1918
29	Portrait of Karl Georg Huyn	Count; Karl Georg Huyn (1857–1938)	1917 – 1 November 1918 (Note: In exile until 26 July 1917 due to Russian occupation during World War I.)	Charles I 1916–1918

== Marshals of the Galician Diet ==
After Galicia received autonomy in 1861, much of the power was shifted to a local parliament, the Galicia Diet based in Lemberg (Lviv). Along with the Polish parliamentary tradition, the chairman of the parliament was named marshal.

No.	Portrait	Name (Birth–Death)	Term
1	Portrait of Prince Leon Sapieha	Prince; Leon Sapieha (1803–1878)	11 April 1861 – 19 March 1875
2	Portrait of Count Alfred Józef Potocki	Count; Alfred Józef Potocki (1812–1875)	19 March 1875 – December 1875
3	Portrait of Duke Włodzimierz Dzieduszycki	Duke; Włodzimierz Dzieduszycki (1825–1899)	7 March 1876 – 1876
4	Portrait of Duke Ludwik Wodzicki	Duke; Ludwik Wodzicki (1834–1894)	8 August 1877 – 1881
5	Portrait of Mikołaj Zyblikiewicz	Mikołaj Zyblikiewicz (1823–1887)	14 September 1881 – 6 November 1886
6	Portrait of Duke Jan Dzierżysław Tarnowski	Duke; Jan Dzierżysław Tarnowski (1835–1894)	18 November 1886 – 1890
7	Portrait of Prince Eustachy Stanisław Sanguszko	Prince; Eustachy Stanisław Sanguszko (1842–1903)	14 October 1890 – 24 September 1895
8	Portrait of Duke Stanisław Marcin Badeni	Duke; Stanisław Marcin Badeni (1850–1912)	31 October 1895 – 7 October 1901
9	Portrait of Count Andrzej Kazimierz Potocki	Count; Andrzej Kazimierz Potocki (1861–1908)	9 October 1901 – 1903
(8)	Portrait of Duke Stanisław Marcin Badeni	Duke; Stanisław Marcin Badeni (1850–1912)	26 June 1903 – June 1912
10	Portrait of Adam Gołuchowski	Adam Gołuchowski (1855–1914)	1913 – 15 April 1914
11	Portrait of Stanisław Niezabitowski	Stanisław Niezabitowski (1860–1941)	15 May 1914 – November 1918

== Ministers of State ==
Ministers of State for Galicia, residing in Vienna:

No.	Portrait	Name (Birth–Death)	Term
—	Portrait of Baronet Kazimierz Grocholski	Baronet; Kazimierz Grocholski (1815–1888)	11 April 1871 – 22 November 1871
—	Portrait of Josef Unger	Josef Unger (1828–1913)	25 November 1871 – 21 April 1873
1	Portrait of Baron Florian Ziemiałkowski	Baron; Florian Ziemiałkowski (1817–1900)	21 April 1873 – 11 October 1888
2	Portrait of Baronet Filip Zaleski	Baronet; Filip Zaleski (1836–1911)	11 October 1888 – 12 November 1892
Vacant
3	Portrait of Apolinary Jaworski	Apolinary Jaworski (1825–1904)	11 November 1893 – 29 September 1895
—	Portrait of Leon Biliński	Leon Biliński (1846–1923)	29 September 1895 – 17 January 1897
4	Portrait of Edward Rittner	Edward Rittner (1845–1899)	17 January 1896 – 30 November 1897
Vacant
5	Portrait of Baron Hermann von Loebl	Baron; Hermann von Loebl (1845–1899)	16 December 1897 – 5 March 1898
6		Adam Jędrzejowicz (1847–1924)	5 March 1898 – 2 October 1899
7	Portrait of Kazimierz Chłędowski	Kazimierz Chłędowski (1843–1920)	2 October 1899 – 18 January 1900
8	Portrait of Leonard Piętak	Leonard Piętak (1841–1909)	19 January 1900 – 28 May 1906
9	Portrait of Count Wojciech Dzieduszycki	Count; Wojciech Dzieduszycki (1848–1909)	2 June 1906 – 9 November 1907
10	Portrait of Dawid Abrahamowicz	Dawid Abrahamowicz (1839–1926)	9 November 1907 – 3 March 1909
11	Portrait of Władysław Dulęba	Władysław Dulęba (1851–1930)	3 March 1909 – 9 January 1911
12	Portrait of Count Wacław Zaleski	Count; Wacław Zaleski (1868–1913)	9 January 1911 – 19 November 1911
13	Portrait of Władysław Długosz	Władysław Długosz (1864–1937)	19 November 1911 – 28 December 1913
Vacant
14	Portrait of Zdzisław Karol Dzierżykraj-Morawski	Zdzisław Karol Dzierżykraj-Morawski (1859–1928)	2 January 1914 – 21 October 1916
15	Portrait of Michał Bobrzyński	Michał Bobrzyński (1849–1935)	31 October 1916 – 23 June 1917
16	Portrait of Juliusz Twardowski	Juliusz Twardowski (1874–1955)	23 June 1917 – 25 July 1918
17	Portrait of Kazimierz Gałecki	Kazimierz Gałecki (1863–1941)	26 July 1918 – 30 October 1918

== Military governors (Napoleonic Wars) ==
- Count Heinrich von Bellegarde (1806–1808), 1st time
- N/A (1808–1809)
- Count Heinrich von Bellegarde (1809–1813), 2nd time
- Baron Michael von Kienmayer (1813–1814)

== See also ==
- List of rulers of Austria
- List of rulers of Partitioned Poland
- General Government of Galicia and Bukovina
