= Franz Ritter von Hauer =

Austrian geologist (1822–1899)

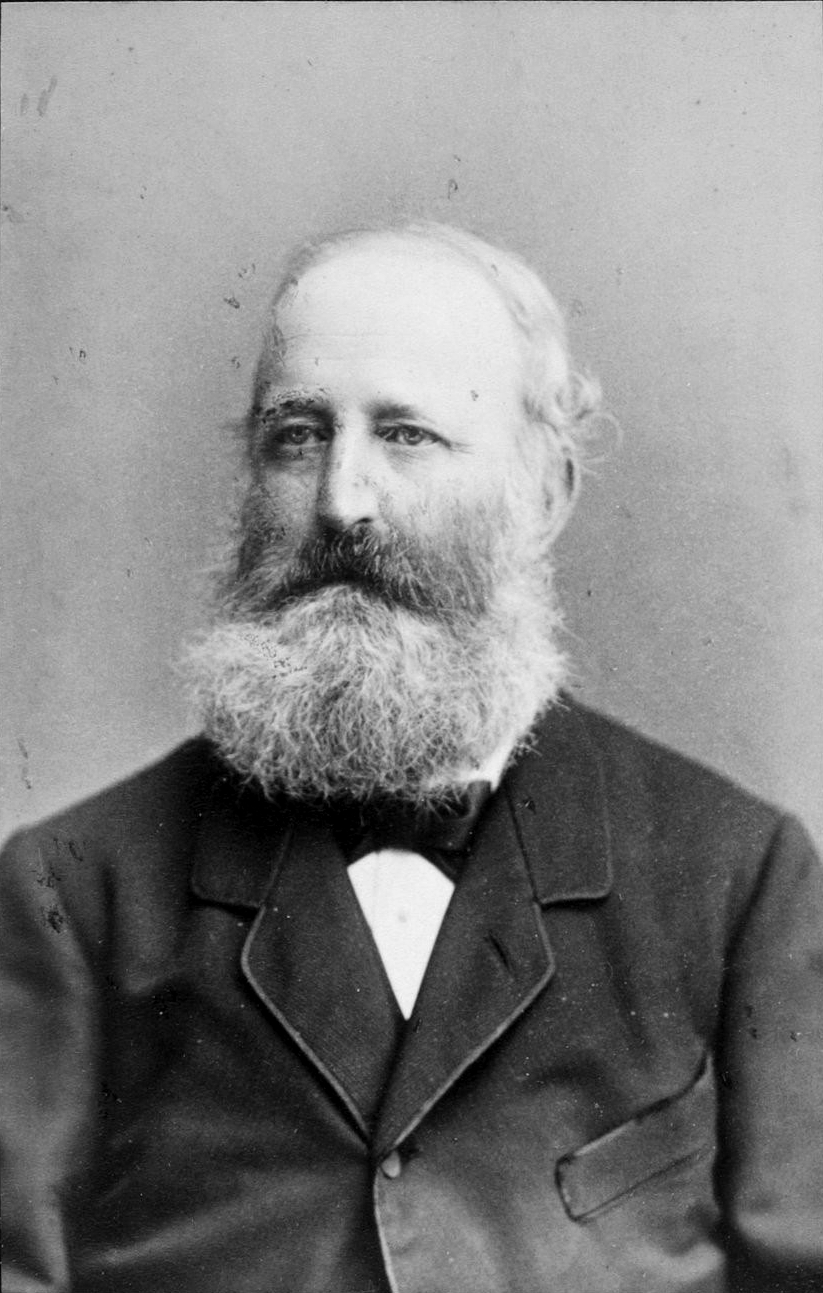
Franz von Hauer

Franz Ritter von Hauer, or Franz von Hauer (30 January 1822 – 20 March 1899) was an Austrian geologist.

== Biography ==
Hauer was born in Vienna, the son of Joseph von Hauer (1778-1863), who was equally distinguished as a high Austrian official and authority on finance and as a palaeontologist.

He studied geology at the mining academy of Schemnitz (1839-1843), and for a time was engaged in official mining work in Styria. In 1846, he became assistant to Wilhelm von Haidinger at the mineralogical museum in Vienna; three years later he joined the imperial geological institute, and in 1866 he was appointed director. In 1886, he became superintendent of the Imperial Natural History Museum in Vienna.

Among his special geological works are those on the Cephalopoda of the Triassic and Jurassic formations of Alpine regions (1855-1856). he recognized and discovered 89 species and established the Middle and Late Triassic stratigraphical units of deep shelf environments. His most important general work was that of the Geological Map of Austro-Hungary, in twelve sheets (1867-1871; 4th ed. 1884, including Bosnia and Montenegro). This map was accompanied by a series of explanatory pamphlets.

In 1874, he was elected as a member to the American Philosophical Society. In 1882, he was awarded the Wollaston medal by the Geological Society of London. He was also elected as the foreign correspondent of the Geological Society of London. In 1892, von Hauer became a life-member of the upper house (Herrenhaus) of the Austrian parliament.

The mineral Hauerite is named after the two von Hauers.

== Publications ==
- Beiträge die Paläontolographie von Österreich (1858-1859)
- Die Geologie und ihre Anwendung auf die Kenntnis der Bodenbeschaffenheit der Österr.-Ungar. Monarchie (1875; ed. 2, 1878).
