= Battle of Montebello (1859) =

Battle during the Wars of Italian Unification

- Part of Second Italian War of Independence
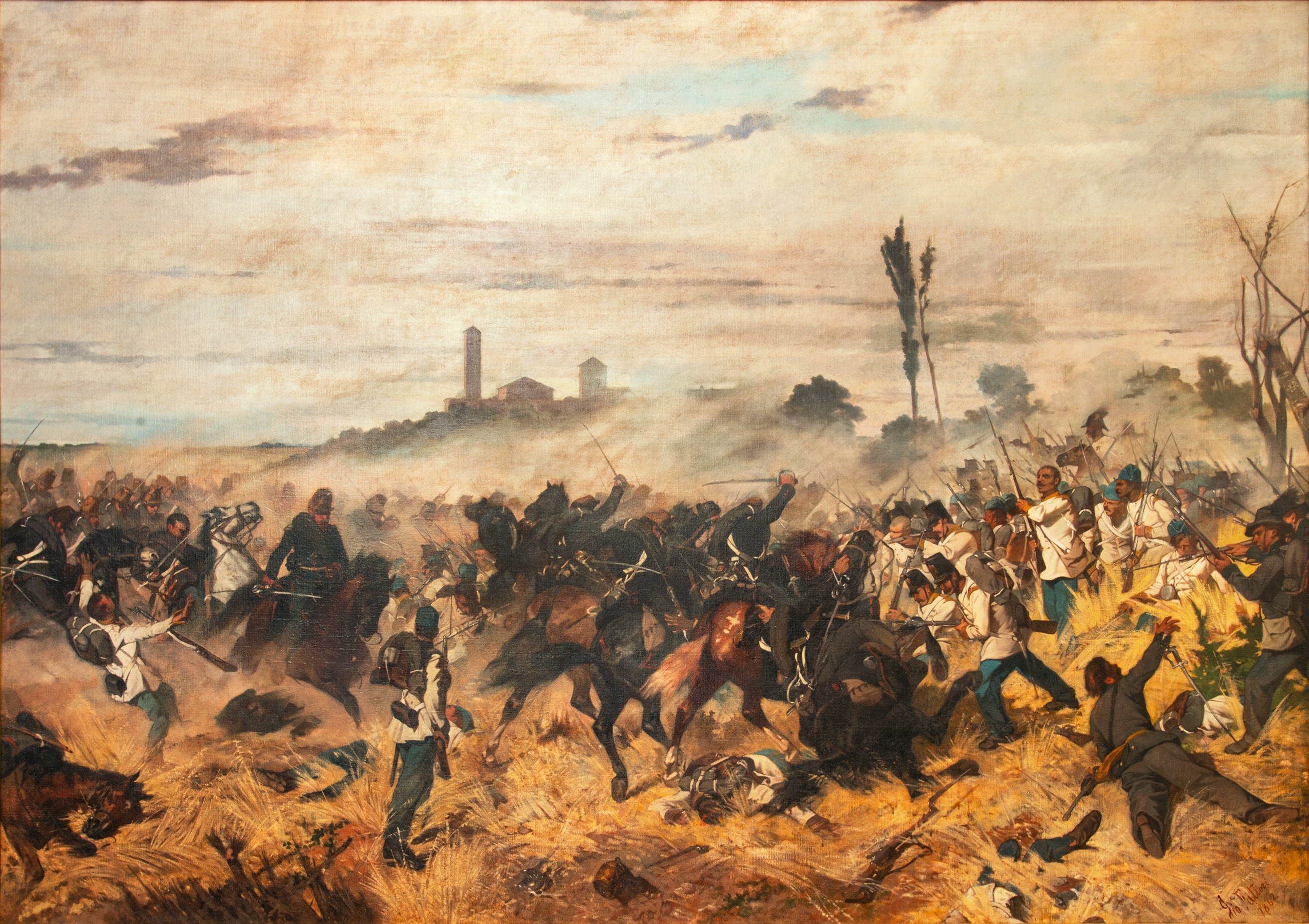
- An episode of the Battle of Montebello by Giovanni Fattori, 1862
| Date | 20 May 1859 |
| Location | Montebello, present-day Italy |
| Result | Franco-Italian victory |

Belligerents
| France; Sardinia | Austria |

Commanders and leaders
| Elie Frédéric Forey | Philipp von Stadion und Thannhausen |

Strength
| 6,600 infantry 3 cavalry regiments | 4,400 infantry initially 18,708 infantry overall 600 cavalry 12 guns 4 rocket launchers |

Casualties and losses
| France: 81 killed 492 wounded 69 missing Sardinia: 52 killed, wounded or prisoners Total: 694 | 331 killed 785 wounded 307 missing Total: 1,423 |

The Battle of Montebello was fought on 20 May 1859 at Montebello (now Montebello della Battaglia) in Lombardy, northern Italy. The first major engagement of the Second Italian War of Independence, it was fought between Austrian troops commanded by Field Marshal Philipp von Stadion und Thannhausen against Piedmontese cavalry and French infantry headed by General Élie Frédéric Forey.

Forey's division, accompanied by three Piedmontese cavalry regiments commanded by General Maurizio Gerbaix de Sonnaz, engaged Stadion's army corps at Montebello. Forey demonstrated his military command talents by concentrating superior forces in an important area. After three hours, failing to stop Forey's offensive, Stadion withdrew. Because of this battle, the Austrian commander-in-chief was obliged to keep troops to cover the southern part of the front.

== Prelude ==
Feldzeugmeister Ferenc Gyulay, commanding the Austrian 2nd Army, deployed the VII Korps along the Sesia, the II and III Korps at Mortara, the VIII Korps at Pavia, and the V Korps between Pavia and Mortara. Gyulay anticipated a Franco-Piedmontese offensive consisting of a flanking maneuver south of the Po. Marshal Achille Baraguey d'Hilliers' I Corps advanced from Voghera, while Giuseppe Garibaldi's Hunters of the Alps advanced from the north. Gyulay assumed they were pressuring his flanks in a manoeuvre sur la derriére.

On 19 May, Stadion's V Korps, divided into four columns, was deployed to the right bank of the Po. Karl von Urban's column advanced rapidly along the main road towards Voghera, repelling the Sardinian Guardia Nazionale at Casteggio, and arrived at the village of Montebello at 1:30 p.m. on 20 May. He decided to occupy Genestrello, a frazione of Montebello located 1.5 km further on, before halting. A short distance to the north, two other columns under Franz von Paumgartten and the Prince of Hesse moved slowly on country roads.

== Battle ==
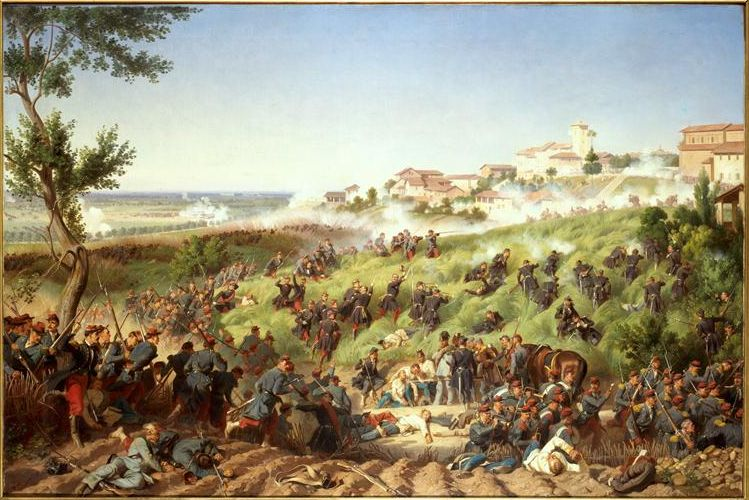
Combat of Montebello, 20 May 1859 by Félix Philippoteaux, 1862.

At 2:30 p.m. on 20 May, Stadion was surprised by the sound of heavy gunfire coming from Genestrello. Urban's leading forces had suddenly collided with the infantry of General Forey's division, which was expecting an Austrian attack. As the bells of the Piedmontese church rang the alarm, Forey reinforced his advance posts with four battalions. Austrian reinforcements pressed on along the road and the railway line, despite persistent charges from the Piedmontese Novara and Montferrato light cavalry regiments. The arrival of the bulk of Forey's division stabilized the situation. On the plain, General Georges Eugène Blanchard's brigade occupied the fortified farm of Cascina Nuova, while General Georges Beuret's brigade seized the heights on the French right. Stadion's troops outnumbered the French three to one, but the latter's concentration at the decisive position in front of Montebello gave the French a local numerical superiority.

Five French battalions (3,000 men) were deployed at Cascina Nuova against two Austrian battalions (2,000 men) of the Braum brigade, while six French battalions (3,600 men) faced three Austrian battalions (2,400) of Schaafsgottsche's brigade at Genestrello. For his part, Hesse was held in check between Casatisma and Oriolo by the Aosta light cavalry regiment and a pair of battalions, which his troops outnumbered three to one. At 3 p.m. the Austrians were driven from Genestrello, forcing Braum's men to retreat. Reinforced by three battalions of the Gaal brigade, Schaafsgottsche's men barricaded Montebello. Forey resumed the offensive between 4 p.m. and 5 p.m. with three battalions totalling 6,000 men. Blanchard threatened the village from the plain, while Beuret continued his turning movement on the right flank. Forey had lost his numerical advantage, but the defenders of Montebello were shaken by the previous fighting.

The Austrian jäger hid in tall wheat fields, and fresh enemies seemed to emerge with every step taken by the French. Forey's men paused to reload on the outskirts of Montebello before forcing the Austrians out house by house. The cemetery was the last part of the village still in Austrian hands. General Beuret was killed while leading a successful attack on the improvised redoubt. By 6:30 p.m., the only Austrians remaining in Montebello were either dead or prisoner. Forey brought up his guns to consolidate his position, but did not launch a pursuit.

== Aftermath ==
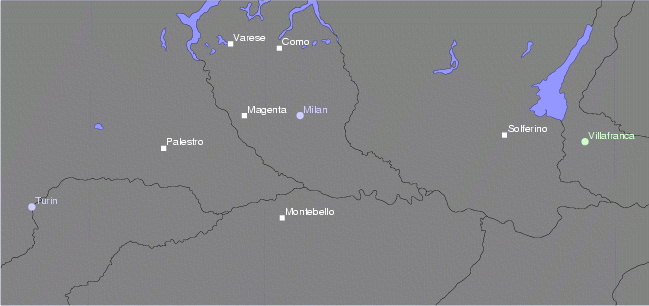
Places of the 1859 Austro-Sardinian War.

On 21 May, Napoleon III received a telegraph stating, "The Austrians have attacked, on the 20th, with approximately 15,000 men the advanced posts of Marshal Baraguey d'Hilliers. They have been repulsed by Division Forey, which conducted itself admirably and liberated the village of Montbello, already famous..." Disconcerted, Gyulay deployed his corps further south.

== Austrian Order of Battle ==
FML Graf Stadion, commander of V Corps

- 2 squadrons of 12th regiment Haller Hussars
- Paumgarten division
  - Gaal brigade
    - 1/1st Liccaner Grenze
    - Regiment 3 Erzherzog Karl, 4 battalions
  - Prince Alexander von Hessen brigade
    - 4/Kaiser Jager Regt
    - Regiment 31 Culoz, 4 battalions
  - Bils Bde
    - 2/3rd Oguliner Grenze
    - Regiment 47 Kinsky, 3 battalions
  - 20 guns
  - elements Boer brigade (attached)
    - Regiment 49, 2nd battalion
    - Regiment 61, 1 battalion

(9,950 infantry, 230 cavalry and 20 guns)

- Urban independent division (attached)
- 2 squadrons of 12th regiment Haller Hussars
  - Schaffgottsche brigade
    - 3rd Jager Btn
    - Regiment 39 Don Miguel, 1 battalion
    - Grenadier Btn of Regiment 59 Raineri
    - Sluiner Grenz, 2 companies
  - Braum brigade
    - Regiment 40 Rossbach, 3 battalions
  - 12 guns
  - 4 rocket launchers

(6,700 infantry, 225 cavalry and 12 guns)

== French Order of Battle ==
According to the French official history, the following totals were present at the battle: 14 infantry battalions, 11 cavalry squadrons, and 6 artillery pieces.

1 Corps - Marshal Achille Baraguey d'Hilliers (not present)

- 1ere Regiment Chasseurs d’Afrique (294 men)
- 1 Battery Artillery (6 guns)
- 1ere Division - General Élie Frédéric Forey (13 btns, 6,110 men)
  - Général de brigade Beuret
    - 17bn Chasseurs à Pied
    - 74e & 84e Infanterie de Ligne (6 btns)
  - Général de brigade Blanchard
    - 91e & 98e Infanterie de Ligne (6 btns)
- 93e Infanterie de Ligne (1 btn) (from 5 Corps 1 Division, 823 men)

Sardinian Army (10 squadrons, 1,000 men)

- Cavalleggeri Regiment Aosta (from 2nd Division)
- Cavalleggeri Regiment Montferrato (from 3rd Division)
- Cavalleggeri Regiment Novara (from 4th Division)

(6,933 infantry, 1,294 Cavalry, 6 guns)
