= Vaccarezza =

Vaccarezza is a surname. Notable people with the surname include:

- Alberto Vaccarezza (1886–1959), Argentine poet and playwright
- Angelo Vaccarezza (born 1965), Italian politician
- Cândido Vaccarezza (born 1955), Brazilian gynecologist and politician
- Maria Pia Vaccarezza (born 1944), Italian former actress

== See also ==
- Vacarezza
