= Leon Biliński =

Polish-Austrian statesman (1846-1923)

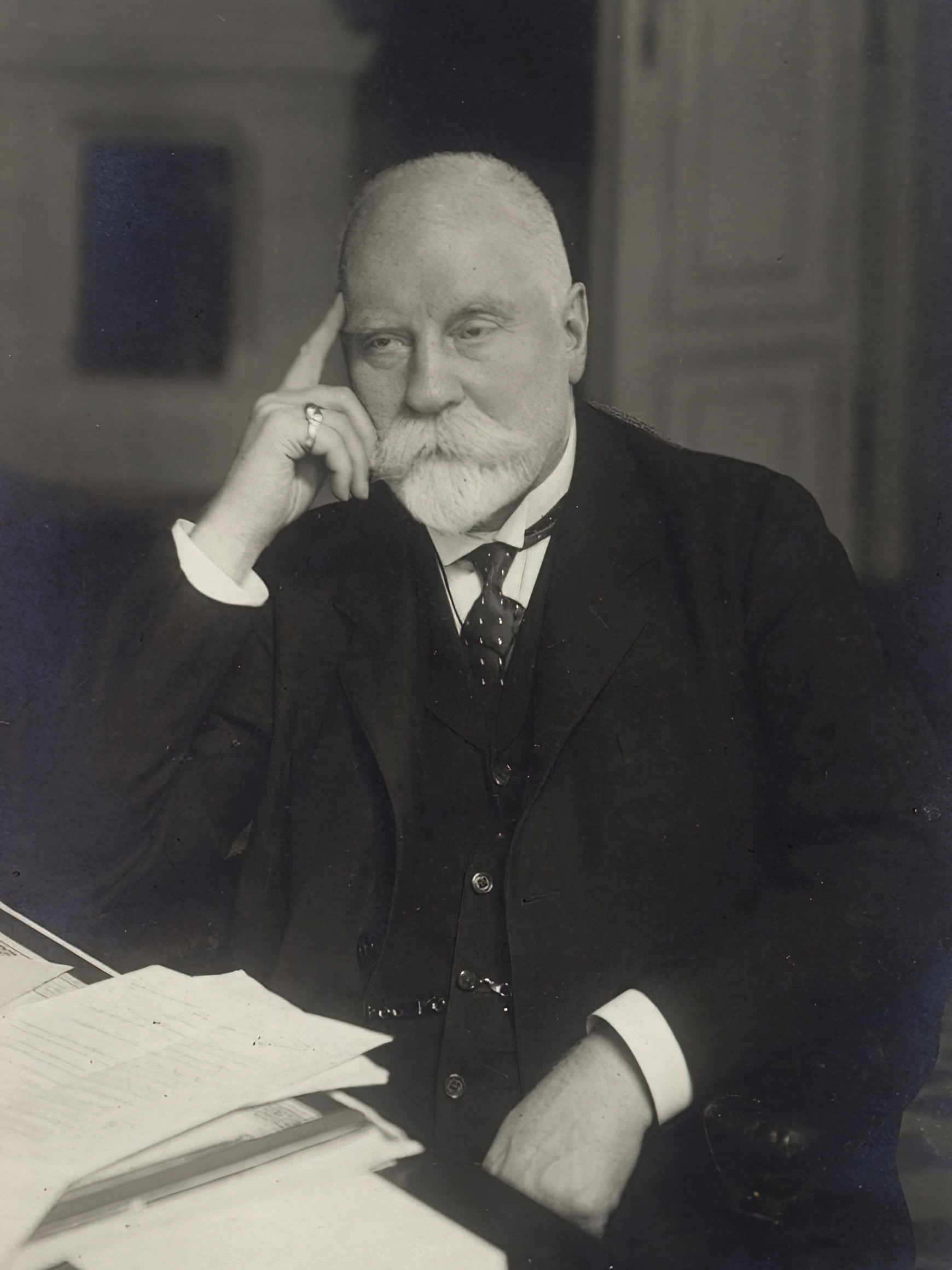

Minister of Finance of Austria-Hungary

Personal details
- Born: 15 June 1846 Zalishchyky, Austrian Empire
- Died: 15 June 1923 (aged 77) Vienna, First Austrian Republic

Leon Biliński (15 June 1846 in Zalischyky – 15 June 1923 in Vienna) was a Polish-Austrian statesman of the Biliński family. He had several important political functions in the Habsburg monarchy and independent Poland: He was President of Austrian State Railways (Kaiserlich-königliche österreichische Staatsbahnen) (1893–1895), Minister of Finance of Austria (1895–97, 1909–11) and Minister of Finance of Austria-Hungary (1912–1915), Governor of the Austro-Hungarian Bank (1900–1909), Governor of Bosnia and Herzegovina (1912−1915), Minister of Finance of the Republic of Poland (1919), president of the Supreme National Committee (1914−1917) and Governor of Galicia (1895−1897).

Biliński was one of the first governors to strongly support women's intellectual and economic emancipation and their free access to higher education. In 1876 he became a member of the Polish Academy of Learning. His academic and feminist efforts later bore fruit — in 1897, the first female students graduated from Lwów University. He was awarded the Knight’s Cross of the Order of Polonia Restituta in 1923.
