= Franz von Paumgartten =

Austrian military officer (1811–1866)

- Born: Franz Xaver von Paumgartten; 8 January 1811; Graz, Styria, Austrian Empire
- Died: 19 November 1866 (aged 55); Vevey, Switzerland
- Education: Theresian Military Academy
- Spouse: Franziska Freiin Lexa von Aehrenthal
- Relatives: Johann Baptist von Paumgartten (father)
- Military career
- Allegiance: Austrian Empire
- Branch: Imperial Austrian Army
- Service years: 1830–1866
- Rank: Feldmarschall-Leutant
- Unit: 76th Infantry Regiment
- Commands: General commander-in-chief in Galicia and Bukovina
- Conflicts: Revolutions of 1848; First Italian War of Independence; Second Italian War of Independence
- Awards: See decorations section
- Other work: Governor of the Kingdom of Galicia and Lodomeria (1864–1866)

Franz Xaver von Paumgartten (8 January 1811 – 19 November 1866) was an Austrian nobleman and military officer. He served as Governor of the Kingdom of Galicia and Lodomeria from 1864 to 1866.

== Biography ==
He graduated from the Theresian Military Academy in Vienna. Beginning in 1830, he served as an Leutnant (lieutenant) in the Galician 1st Uhlan Regiment "Ritter von Brudermann". He subsequently served in the 45th and 21st Infantry Regiments, and from 1846, as a Major in the 11th Imperial Infantry Regiment, participating in the defense of the Fortress of Mainz. In September 1848, as a Oberstleutnant (lieutenant colonel) and regimental commander, he took part in suppressing the September Uprising in Frankfurt during the Revolutions of 1848. Later, holding the rank of Oberst (colonel) and commanding the 56th Imperial Infantry Regiment, he served in Northern Italy, where, during the 1849 revolution in Tuscany, he fought against the forces of the provisional republican government. In 1850, he was promoted to Generalmajor (major general) and placed in command of a brigade stationed in Bohemia. As a Brigadier, he served as the commandant of the Fortress of Mainz (1854–1856) and subsequently of the Fortress of Ancona (1858–1859). In 1859, he was promoted to the rank of Feldmarschall-Leutant (lieutenant field marshal). During the Second Italian War of Independence, he commanded a division of the V Corps at the Battle of Montebello and during the Battle of Magenta (4 June 1859)—a defeat for the Austrian forces. He was subsequently tasked with organizing a militia in Tyrol. Later, he served as the deputy military governor of Mainz (1859–1864). As Geheimrat (privy councillor), he served as Governor of the Kingdom of Galicia and Lodomeria (1864–1866) and as commander of the Austrian forces stationed in Galicia and Bukovina. Suffering from tuberculosis, he resigned on 10 October 1866, and travelled to Switzerland for medical treatment, where he subsequently passed away. He was buried in Doksany, near Litoměřice in the present-day Czech Republic. From 1860 he was colonel-in-chief of the 76th Infantry Regiment.

== Family ==
Born into a wealthy landowning family that held the title of baron. He was the son of the Austrian field marshal lieutenant Johann Baptist von Paumgartten and was married to Franziska Freiin Lexa von Aehrenthal.

== Decorations ==
Paumgartten's decorations include, among others:

- Austrian Empire: Military Merit Cross with War Decoration
- Tuscany: Knight of the Order of Saint Joseph
- Papal States: Supreme Order of Christ
- Prussia:
  - Order of the Red Eagle, 1st Class
  - Royal Order of the Crown, 1st Class
- Luxembourg: Grand Cross of the Order of the Oak Crown
- Hesse:
  - Commander of the Ludwig Order with Star
  - Grand Cross of the Order of Merit of Philip the Magnanimous with Swords
- Saxony: Grand Cross of the Saxe-Ernestine House Order
- Nassau: Grand Cross of the Order of Merit of Adolphe of Nassau
- Parma: Grand Cross of the Order of Merit of Saint Louis

Government offices
Preceded by Alexander Mensdorff-Pouilly	Governor of the Kingdom of Galicia and Lodomeria; 1864–1866	Succeeded by Agenor Romuald Gołuchowski
