= Derek Beales =

British historian (1931–2023)

Derek Edward Dawson Beales, FBA (12 June 1931 – 10 July 2023) was a British historian. He wrote the definitive work on the Holy Roman Emperor Joseph II.

Born in Felixstowe, he was educated at Sidney Sussex College, Cambridge, where he gained a BA in 1953, an MA and a PhD in 1957. He was appointed a Fellow of Sidney Sussex in 1955 and a University Lecturer in History in 1965, which he held until 1980. He was then Professor of Modern History at Cambridge until 1997.

Beales was editor of The Historical Journal from 1971 until 1975. From 1984 until 1987 he was a member of the council of the Royal Historical Society. In 1989 he was elected a fellow of the British Academy.

Derek Beales died on 10 July 2023, at the age of 92.

== Works ==
- England and Italy, 1859-60 (Nelson, 1961).
- From Castlereagh to Gladstone, 1815-1885 (Thomas Nelson and Sons, 1969).
- Joseph II, Volume I: In the Shadow of Maria Theresa, 1741-1780 (Cambridge University Press, 1987).
- Prosperity and Plunder: European Catholic Monasteries in the Age of Revolution, 1650–1815 (Cambridge University Press, 2003).
- Enlightenment and Reform in 18th-Century Europe (I.B. Tauris, 2005).
- Joseph II, Volume II: Against the World, 1780–1790 (Cambridge University Press, 2009).
