= Joseph von Hauer =

Austrian finance official and statesman (1778–1863)

Joseph von Hauer (6 March 1778, Vienna – 2 February 1863, Vienna) was an Austrian finance official, statesman and paleontologist.

== Life ==
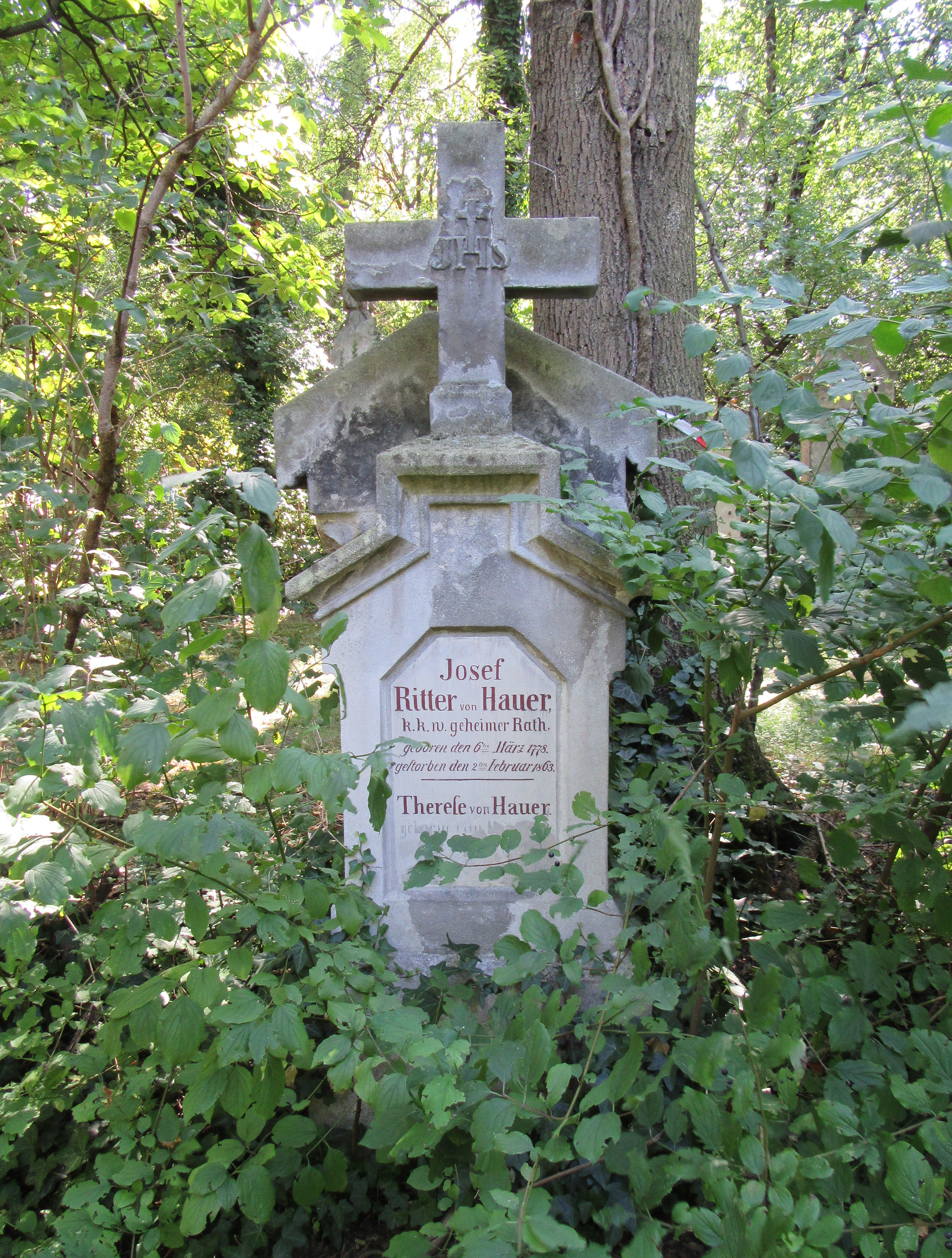
Grave of Joseph von Hauer at the St. Marx Cemetery, Vienna

Joseph von Hauer, son of Karl Josef von Hauer, member of the Austrian Imperial War Council, studied law until 1798 at the University of Vienna. In 1800 he became district commissioner in Korneuburg. After 1807 he worked at the Imperial Finance Bureau in Vienna, serving as its vice-chairman from 1831 until his retirement in 1848.

He also performed various diplomatic tasks. In 1805 he served in the army commissariat with the Russian troops, and after the Battle of Austerlitz with the French troops. In 1807 he carried out an economic tour of the Alpine districts. In 1809 he was involved in the relocation of archival and artistic materials, including the Imperial "Cabinet of Curiosities" (Naturalienkabinett), from Vienna to Hungary to escape the French. He was able to return this to Vienna in 1810. In 1810 he traveled with Karl Chotek of Chotków to France to survey economic and political conditions there for the imperial government. In 1811 he became a member of the commission for the elimination of banknotes, and in 1816 he was involved in the regulation of the coinage. He also published writings on topics of the financial and administrative system.

In addition to his profession Hauer was interested in science, especially in paleontology. For example, he explored the Tertiary strata of the Vienna Basin. Fossil material of foraminifera which he discovered and collected was used by Alcide d'Orbigny in 1846 for his monograph on the foraminifera of the Vienna Basin. In 1846 Hauer became a member of the Association of Freunde der Naturwissenschaften. In 1847 he was admitted to the Geology and Paleontology Section of the Academy of Sciences Leopoldina.

Von Hauer is buried at the St. Marx Cemetery in Vienna. His collection is now in the Mountain Museum of the Geological Survey in Vienna.

His son, Franz Ritter von Hauer, was also active as a geologist and paleontologist, another son, Karl von Hauer, was a captain in the imperial army and a chemist. As such he was a director of the Laboratory of the Imperial Geological Institution (Geologischen Reichsanstalt).
