= Vacarezza =

Vacarezza is a surname. Notable people with the surname include:

- Adriana Vacarezza (born 1961), Chilean actress
- Gerardo Vacarezza (born 1965), Chilean tennis player
- Marcela Vacarezza (born 1970), Chilean television presenter and psychologist, sister of Marcela

== See also ==
- Vaccarezza
