= Kotovsky (rural locality) =

Kotovsky (Russian: Котовский; masculine), Kotovskaya (Котовская; feminine), or Kotovskoye (Котовское; neuter) is the name of several rural localities in Russia:

- Kotovsky, Kemerovo Oblast, a settlement in Svyatoslavskaya Rural Territory of Izhmorsky District of Kemerovo Oblast
- Kotovsky, Novoderevenkovsky District, Oryol Oblast, a village in Novoderevenkovsky District of the Oryol region
- Kotovsky, Serafimovichsky District, Volgograd Oblast, a khutor in Bolshovsky Selsoviet of Serafimovichsky District of Volgograd Oblast
- Kotovsky, Uryupinsky District, Volgograd Oblast, a khutor in Kotovsky Selsoviet of Uryupinsky District of Volgograd Oblast
- Kotovskoye, a selo in Kotovsky Selsoviet of Rasskazovsky District of Tambov Oblast
- Kotovskaya, a village in Moshinsky Selsoviet of Nyandomsky District of Arkhangelsk Oblast
