= Regiment "Cavalleggeri Guide" (19th) =

Active Italian Army cavalry unit

- Reggimento "Cavalleggeri Guide" (19°)
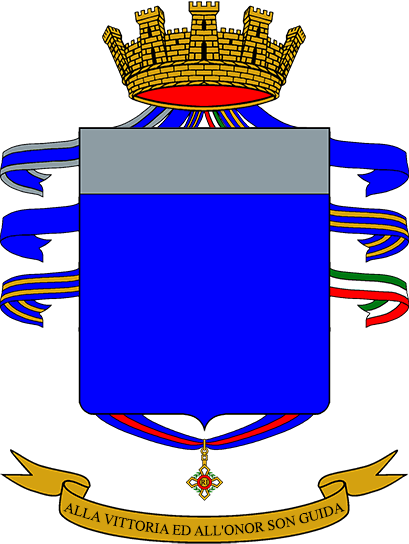
- Regimental coat of arms
- Active: 25 Feb. 1860 — 21 Nov. 1919; 20 May 1920 — 18 Sept. 1943; 1 July 1975 — today
- Country: Italy
- Branch: Italian Army
- Part of: Bersaglieri Brigade "Garibaldi"
- Garrison/HQ: Salerno
- Motto: "Alla vittoria e all'onor son guida"
- Anniversaries: 24 June 1866 - Battle of Custoza
- Decorations: 1× Military Order of Italy; 1× Silver Medal of Military Valor; 2× Bronze Medals of Military Valor; 1× Gold Medal of Army Valor; 1× Silver Medal of Army Valor; 1× Silver Medal of Civil Valor

Insignia
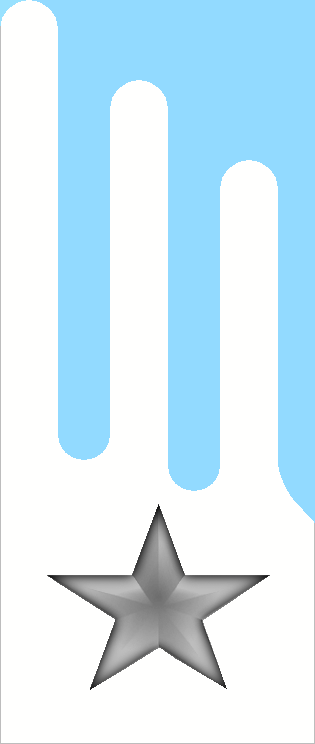
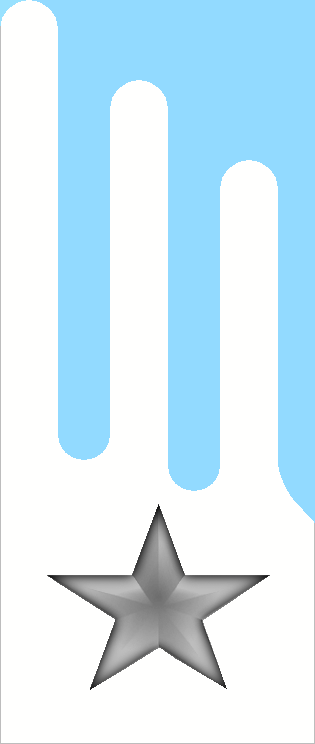
- Regimental gorget patches

The Regiment "Cavalleggeri Guide" (19th) (Italian: Reggimento "Cavalleggeri Guide" (19°) - "Chevau-léger Guides") is a cavalry unit of the Italian Army based in Salerno in Campania. The regiment was the only Guides cavalry unit of the Savoyard state and later the Kingdom of Italy. Today the regiment is the reconnaissance unit of the Bersaglieri Brigade "Garibaldi". The regiment was formed in 1860 by the Royal Sardinian Army with pre-existing units. In 1866, the regiment distinguished itself in the Battle of Custoza. In World War I the regiment fought on the Italian front. After World War I the regiment was disbanded in November 1919, but then reformed already seven months later in May 1920. In 1934, the regiment operated the army's Fast Tanks School. During World War II the regiment operated as a mounted unit and fought in 1940-41 in the Greco-Italian War. Afterwards the regiment remained in Albania on occupation duty until it was disbanded by invading German forces after the announcement of the Armistice of Cassibile on 8 September 1943.

In 1949, during the Cold War, the Italian Army formed an armored squadron, which was given the name and traditions of the regiment. The squadron was assigned to the Armored Brigade "Ariete" as the brigade's reconnaissance unit. In 1952, the Armored Brigade "Ariete" was expanded to Armored Division "Ariete" and consequently, one year later the squadron was expanded to Squadrons Group "Cavalleggeri Guide". In 1975, the squadrons group was renamed 19th Squadrons Group "Cavalleggeri Guide" and assigned the regiment's standard. In 1986, the Armored Division "Ariete" was disbanded and the squadrons group was transferred to the 32nd Armored Brigade "Mameli". In 1991, the brigade was disbanded and the squadrons group moved to Salerno in the South of Italy, where it joined the 8th Bersaglieri Brigade "Garibaldi". In August of the same year, the squadrons group lost its autonomy and entered the 19th Regiment "Cavalleggeri Guide", which one year later was renamed Regiment "Cavalleggeri Guide" (19th). The regiment's anniversary falls on 24 June 1866, the day of the Battle of Custoza, during which the regiment's squadrons distinguished themselves, for which the regiment was awarded a Silver Medal of Military Valor. As the regiment is a Chevau-léger unit, its enlisted personnel is addressed as "Chevau-léger" (Italian: Cavalleggero).

== History ==
=== Italian Wars of Independence ===
==== Second Italian War of Independence ====
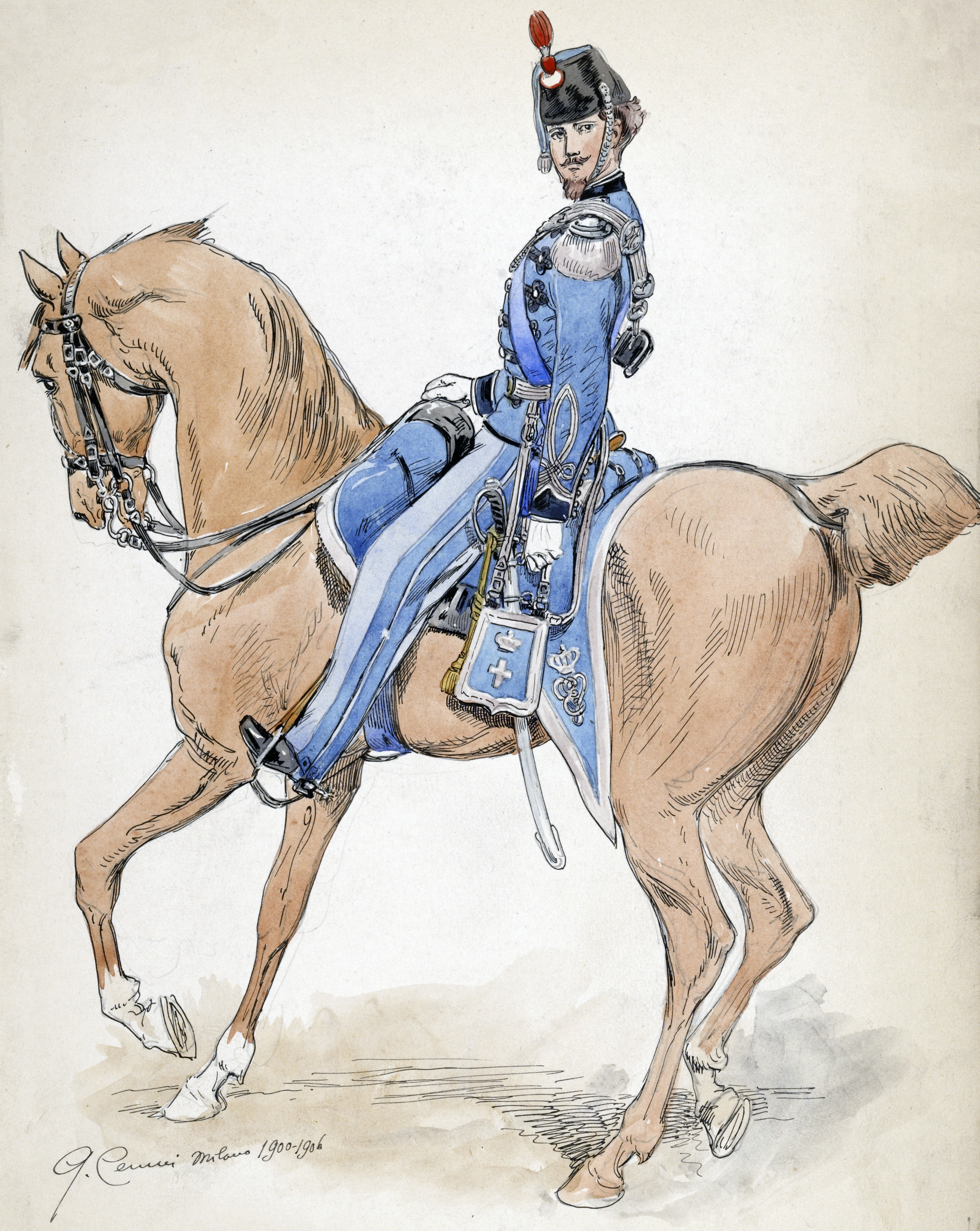
Lieutenant in the Guides Regiment's azure colored uniform between 29 February 1860 and 1 November 1861

On 12 September 1848, between the two campaigns of the First Italian War of Independence, three squadrons of mounted guides were formed in Stupinigi. On 3 January 1850, these three squadrons entered the newly formed Regiment "Cavalleggeri di Monferrato" in Pinerolo. In preparation for the Second Italian War of Independence, the Royal Sardinian Army's Cavalry School in Pinerolo formed on 10 April 1859 a new Mounted Guides Squadron. The squadron consisted of seven officers and 150 enlisted men, which were divided into six platoons. The personnel for the squadron was drawn from existing cavalry regiments and mounted on fresh horses. Each of the squadron's six platoons was attached to one of the six divisions of the Royal Sardinian Army for the upcoming war, which began on 26 April 1859. During the war the Guides distinguished themselves and members of the squadron were awarded a total of 14 Silver Medals of Military Valor and 16 Bronze Medals of Military Valor.

On 25 February 1860, the Horse Guides Squadron entered the newly formed Guides Regiment (Italian: Reggimento Guide), which also incorporated the Mounted Guides Squadron of the Emilian Army, as well as Lombardian troops, who had previously served in the cavalry of the Imperial Austrian Army, and 200 officers and enlisted drawn from existing light cavalry regiments of the Royal Sardinian Army. The new regiment consisted of five squadrons and a depot, and fielded 32 officers, 710 enlisted, and 586 horses. As one of the Royal Sardinian Army's light cavalry regiments, the regiment's troops were armed with musket, pistol and sabre. The regiment's members wore an azure colored uniform with white ornaments. The troops also received azure sabretaches embroidered with the white cross of Savoy and azure shabracks for their horses. This made the regiment, together with the Regiment "Ussari di Piacenza", one of only two cavalry regiments not to wear the Sardinian cavalry's dark blue uniform. On 6 June 1860, the Sardinian War Ministry ordered that the army's light cavalry regiments would be equipped henceforth only with sabre and pistol.

In October 1860, the regiment's 1st Squadron and 2nd Squadron participated in the Sardinian campaign in central and southern Italy, which led to the annexation of central and southern Italy. In January 1861, the regiment added two new squadrons and then consisted of seven squadrons. Between 1864 and 1866, the regiment operated in southern Italy to suppress the anti-Sardinian revolt, which had erupted after the Kingdom of Sardinia had annexed the Kingdom of the Two Sicilies. In these years the regiment operated in Campania and Capitanata and then in Sicily. On 1 February 1866, the regiment's 7th Squadron was disbanded.

==== Third Italian War of Independence ====
On 20 June 1866, the Third Italian War of Independence between the Kingdom of Italy and the Austrian Empire began. During the war the Guides Regiment formed, together with the Regiment "Lancieri di Aosta" and Regiment "Cavalleggeri di Lucca", the Cavalry Brigade of the I Corps of the Army of the Mincio, which operated along the Mincio river. On 24 June 1866, the I Corps fought in the Battle of Custoza, during which the Guides Regiment's squadrons distinguished themselves. At 6:00 in the morning of the day, the Italian I Corps encountered Austrian forces at Oliosi and soon the 1st Division and 5th Division of the I Corps were in heavy combat against the Austrian V Corps, which fielded twice the number of troops. After four hours of combat, the Italian 1st Division was badly mauled and needed to retreat. At Campagna Rossa, just to the West of Oliosi, the remnants of the Italian 29th Infantry Regiment (Brigade "Pisa") were about to be overrun, when the Guides Regiment's 3rd Squadron arrived and was ordered to immediately charge the IV Battalion of the Austrian 76th Infantry Regiment "von Paumgarten", which was pressing the Italian 29th Infantry Regiment hardest. The 3rd Squadron charged the Austrian infantry, which was forced to cease its attacks on the 29th Infantry Regiment and form squares to meet the cavalry charge. The 3rd Squadron suffered two officers and 27 enlisted killed in the charge, which had allowed the 29th Infantry Regiment (Brigade "Pisa") to disengage and retreat to Valeggio.

While part of the Italian I Corps was engaged at Oliosi, the corps' 2nd Division and the Guides Regiment's 1st and 2nd squadrons remained at Pozzolengo to guard against a possible Austrian sally from the city of Peschiera. At 9:30 in the morning the Italian patrols discovered that the Austrian tried to move around the I Corps' divisions at Oliosi with the aim to take the bridge over the Mincio river at Monzambano, which would have cut off the line of communication and retreat of the Italian I Corps. Consequently, the 2nd Division left Pozzolengo and marched to Monzambano, while the two squadrons of the Guides Regiment rode ahead. At noon, the two squadrons arrived at the bridge and lined up to face the Austrian forces arriving from the North. Shortly thereafter, Austrian infantry appeared in the distance. The 1st Squadron charged the first Austrian unit, a battalion of the Tyrolean Kaiserjäger Regiment, which was dispersed. The 1st Squadron then fell back, and the 2nd Squadron lined up to charge the every more numerous Austrian infantry. The second charge was led by the 1st Platoon of the 1st Squadron and the 2nd Squadron, which together drove the Austrian infantry back a second time. By now Italian infantry of the Brigade "Siena" had arrived, which secured the bridge. In the two charges the 1st and 2nd squadrons had suffered three killed and 10 injured. For the conduct of its squadrons at Custoza the Guides Regiment was awarded, belatedly on 14 June 1910, a Silver Medal of Military Valor, which was affixed to the regiment's standard.

On 10 September 1871, the regiment was renamed 19th Cavalry Regiment (Guide). On 1 April 1872, the regiment adopted the Royal Italian Army's standard cavalry uniform and the colors of its former azure colored uniform were reflected in the regiment's azure-white gorget patches. On 5 November 1876, the regiment was renamed Cavalry Regiment "Guide" (19th). On 1 October 1883, the regiment ceded its 6th Squadron to help form the Cavalry Regiment "Catania" (22nd). In 1887, the regiment provided personnel and horses for the formation of the 1st Africa Cavalry Squadron and the Mounted Hunters Squadron, which fought in the Italo-Ethiopian War of 1887–1889. On 1 November of the same year, the regiment ceded one of its squadrons to help form the Cavalry Regiment "Vicenza" (24th). In 1895-96, the regiment provided 73 enlisted for units deployed to Italian Eritrea for the First Italo-Ethiopian War. On 16 December 1897, the regiment was renamed Regiment "Cavalleggeri Guide" (19th). On 1 October 1909, the regiment ceded its 3rd Squadron to help form the Regiment "Cavalleggeri di Aquila" (27th).

=== Italo-Turkish War ===
On 29 September 1911, the Kingdom of Italy declared war against the Ottoman Empire, which started the Italo-Turkish War. On 5 October 1911, sailors of the Royal Italian Navy occupied Tripoli in Libya. On 11 October, the sailors were replaced by Royal Italian Army units. In January 1912, 2nd Squadron and 4th Squadron of the Regiment "Cavalleggeri Guide" (19th) arrived in Tripoli as reinforcement. On 8 June 1912, the two squadrons fought in the Battle of Zanzur. At the end of 1913, the two squadrons were repatriated.

=== World War I ===
At the outbreak of World War I the regiment consisted of a command, a depot, and two cavalry groups, with the I Group consisting of three squadrons and the II Group consisting of two squadrons and a machine gun section. As the regiment's 2nd Squadron was deployed to Libya, where the squadron remained for the duration of the war, the regiment formed the 6th Squadron as replacement. Together with the Regiment "Cavalleggeri di Treviso" (28th) the regiment formed the VIII Cavalry Brigade, which was assigned to the 4th Cavalry Division "Piemonte". In April 1916, the division was dismounted for service in the trenches of the Italian front. After being dismounted the regiment was reinforced by the dismounted 3rd Squadron of the Regiment "Cavalleggeri di Lodi" (15th). On 11 May 1916, the 4th Cavalry Division "Piemonte" entered the trenches at Monfalcone below the Karst plateau. In the night from 14 to 15 May 1916, just before the start of the Austro-Hungarian Asiago offensive, the Austro-Hungarian Army launched a surprise diversionary attack on the Italian positions at Monfalcone. The Austro-Hungarian attack drove the Italian cavalry troops off the important Height 93, which the VIII Cavalry Brigade, supported by the 15th Bersaglieri Regiment and the XI Cyclists Battalion of the 11th Bersaglieri Regiment, retook the following day. The next day, on May 16, the Italian units pushed the Austro-Hungarian troops back to their starting lines.

On 28 June 1916, the Italian forces launched an attack on the Austro-Hungarian positions on the flanks of the Karst plateau, during which the Regiment "Cavalleggeri di Treviso" (28th) operated at Selz to the North of Monfalcone. On 6 July 1916, the Regiment "Cavalleggeri Guide" (19th) replaced the Regiment "Cavalleggeri di Treviso" (28th) in the trenches at Selz. In late July 1916, the 1st Cavalry Division "Friuli" and 4th Cavalry Division "Piemonte" switched places on the front, with the 1st Cavalry Division "Friuli" entering the trenches at Monfalcone below the Karst plateau, while the 4th Cavalry Division "Piemonte" entered the trenches at Plave in the center of the Isonzo front. In 1917, the regiment's depot in Voghera formed the 737th Dismounted Machine Gunners Company as reinforcement for the regiment. In late October 1917, after the Italian defeat in the Battle of Caporetto, the regiment's machine gunner squadron defended the Isonzo river bridge at Lucinico and the Tagliamento river bridge at Casarsa della Delizia, while the regiment fought a rearguard action at San Vito al Tagliamento. These actions helped the Italian 3rd Army to retreat and reach the new Italian frontline on the Piave river.

In late October 1918, after the Italian victory in the Battle of Vittorio Veneto, the regiment, like all cavalry regiments, was ordered to pursue the retreating Austro-Hungarian armies. On 30 October, the regiment's II Group crossed the Livenza river and defeated the Austro-Hungarian forces defending Sacile. The liberation of Sacile prevented the Austro-Hungarians from establishing a new front line along the Livenza river. The regiment then fought enemy forces at Cormons, crossed the Tagliamento] river, and reached the village of Pozzuolo del Friuli by the time the Armistice of Villa Giusti came into force. For its conduct at Monfalcone in May 1916 and for the liberation of Sacile the regiment was awarded a Bronze Medal of Military Valor, which was affixed to the regiment's standard.

=== Interwar years ===
After the war the Royal Italian Army disbanded the second groups of all thirty cavalry regiments, while the first groups were reduced to two squadrons. On 21 November 1919, 14 cavalry regiments were disbanded and their groups transferred to 14 of the remaining cavalry regiments. One of the disbanded regiments was the Regiment "Cavalleggeri Guide" (19th), whose group was renamed II Squadrons Group "Cavalleggeri Guide". Afterwards, the squadrons group, which remained based in Voghera and retained the disbanded regiment's standard, was assigned to the Regiment "Cavalleggeri di Foggia" (11th).

On 20 May 1920, the Royal Italian Army disbanded five additional cavalry regiments and reformed the Regiment "Cavalleggeri Guide" (19th). Among the disbanded regiments, were the Regiment "Cavalleggeri di Foggia" (11th) and the Regiment "Lancieri di Milano" (7th) in Padua. The command of the Regiment "Cavalleggeri Guide" (19th) was formed with the personnel of the command of the Regiment "Lancieri di Milano" (7th), whose barracks in Padua the reformed regiment took over. On the same day, 20 May 1920, the reformed regiment received the II Squadrons Group "Cavalleggeri Guide" from the disbanded Regiment "Cavalleggeri di Foggia" (11th). The reformed regiment also received the I Squadrons Group of the disbanded Regiment "Cavalleggeri di Lucca" (16th), once the squadrons group returned from its deployment in Bulgaria. On 1 July 1920, the traditions and standards of the disbanded regiments "Lancieri di Milano" (7th), "Cavalleggeri di Lucca" (16th), "Cavalleggeri di Roma" (20th), "Cavalleggeri di Padova" (21st), and "Cavalleggeri di Vicenza" (24th) were entrusted to the Regiment "Cavalleggeri Guide" (19th), which changed its name to Regiment "Cavalleggeri Guide". On 24 May 1925, the standards of the five disbanded cavalry regiments were transferred to the Shrine of the Flags, which at the time was located in Castel Sant'Angelo, for safekeeping.

In 1932, the regiment moved from Padua to Parma. The regiment became the first Italian cavalry unit to operate L3/33 tankettes. On 5 January 1934, the regiment's I Squadrons Group was renamed I Fast Tanks Group "San Marco". On 5 April of the same year, the regiment's formed the II Fast Tanks Group "San Giusto" and on 26 June, the III Fast Tanks Group "San Martino". Consequently, the regiment, which also retained the Squadrons Group "San Giorgio" with two mounted squadrons, doubled at the army's Fast Tanks School. Afterwards the regiment consisted of the following units:

- Regiment "Cavalleggeri Guide" - Fast Tanks School, in Padua
  - I Fast Tanks Group "San Marco" (1st, 2nd, and 3rd Squadron)
  - II Fast Tanks Group "San Giusto" (4th, 5th, and 6th Squadron)
  - III Fast Tanks Group "San Martino" (7th, 8th, and 9th Squadron)
  - Squadrons Group "San Giorgio" (1st and 2nd Squadron)

In January 1935, the three fast tank groups were transferred to the army's three cavalry divisions: the II Fast Tanks Group "San Giusto" to the 1st Cavalry Division "Eugenio di Savoia", the I Fast Tanks Group "San Marco" to the 2nd Cavalry Division "Emanuele Filiberto Testa di Ferro", and the III Fast Tanks Group "San Giorgio" to the 3rd Cavalry Division "Principe Amedeo Duca d'Aosta". The personnel of the three battalions retained the colors of the regiment's gorget patches with the only variation being that the points were reduced from three to two. In 1934, the regiment also trained six additional fast tank squadrons for the six cavalry regiments, which were not assigned to the three cavalry division. These squadrons were then used to form the IV Fast Tanks Group "Duca degli Abruzzi" (10th, 11th, and 12th Squadron) in winter 1934–35 and the V Fast Tanks Group "Baldissera" (13th, 14th, and 15th Squadron) on 14 March 1935. In May 1935, the IV Fast Tanks Group "Duca degli Abruzzi" was sent to Eritrea in preparation for the Second Italo-Ethiopian War, followed in August of the same year, by the V Fast Tanks Group "Baldissera". For the war in Ethiopia, the Regiment "Cavalleggeri Guide" provided 39 officers and 603 enlisted for units deployed to East Africa. After the end of the war, the V Fast Tanks Group "Baldissera" was repatriated in February 1936 and disbanded upon arriving in Italy, while the IV Fast Tanks Group "Duca degli Abruzzi" was disbanded in March 1936 in Eritrea.

After having ceded the I, II, and III fast tank groups to the army's cavalry divisions, the Regiment "Cavalleggeri Guide" was mounted on horses again. However, the regiment also continued its duty as the army's Fast Tanks School and trained twelve new fast tank squadrons, one for each of the army's cavalry regiments. In 1938, all fast tank squadrons of the cavalry were disbanded and all L3/33 tankettes were transferred to the army's tank infantry regiments.

=== World War II ===
At the outbreak of World War II the regiment consisted of a command, a command squadron, the 5th Machine Gunners Squadron, and the I and II squadrons groups, which both consisted of two mounted squadrons. The regiment fielded 37 officers, 37 non-commissioned officers, 798 enlisted troops and 818 horses. The regiment was equipped with one car, six motorcycles, 16 trucks, 36 Breda mod. 30 light machine guns, and 12 Fiat mod. 35 heavy machine guns. In August 1940, the regiment was sent to the recently annexed Albania. In October 1940, the regiment was assigned, together with the 23rd Infantry Division "Ferrara", 51st Infantry Division "Siena", and 131st Armored Division "Centauro", to the Army Corps of the Ciamuria, which operated in the Chameria region (Italian: Ciamuria). On 28 October 1940, Italy invaded Greece and the Regiment "Cavalleggeri Guide" operated as vanguard of the 23rd Infantry Division "Ferrara". From 2–8 November 1940, the regiment fought in the Battle of Elaia–Kalamas. For the regiment's conduct during the initial Italian invasion and the following Greek counter-offensive the regiment was awarded a Bronze Medal of Military Valor, which was affixed to the regiment's standard.

After the invasion of Yugoslavia and the German invasion of Greece the regiment remained in northern Albania, where it fought against Albanian partisans and Yugoslav partisans. In 1942, the regiment was deployed in Croatia on anti-partisan duty. In 1943, the regiment operated again in Albania. In the evening of 8 September 1943, the Armistice of Cassibile, which ended hostilities between the Kingdom of Italy and the Anglo-American Allies, was announced by General Dwight D. Eisenhower on Radio Algiers and by Marshal Pietro Badoglio on Italian radio. Germany reacted by invading Italy and Albania and the Germans disbanded the regiment on 18 September 1943.

On 30 November 1940, the regiment's depot in Parma formed the XIV Dismounted Group "Cavalleggeri Guide", which was assigned to the 210th Coastal Division in Salento. After the announcement of the Armistice of Cassibile the troops of the regiment's depot in Parma defended the city against the invading Germans for two days before surrendering. At the same time the 210th Coastal Division, together with the 58th Infantry Division "Legnano", 152nd Infantry Division "Piceno" and XXXI Coastal Brigade, formed a defensive line beginning in Taranto and running through Grottaglie, Francavilla Fontana, and Latiano to Brindisi, behind which the British 1st Airborne Division landed on 9 September. The next day, on 10 September, the 210th Coastal Division, including the XIV Dismounted Group "Cavalleggeri Guide", surrendered to the British forces, which reactivated the division on 13 September to guard the British units' rear. In December 1943, the XIV Dismounted Group "Cavalleggeri Guide" was moved to the Italian front, where it supported the allied forces as frontline logistics unit. In 1944, the group was renamed 14th Combat Supply Unit "Guide" and assigned to the Italian Co-belligerent Army's Italian Liberation Corps.

On 27 June 1944, the Italian Co-belligerent Army formed the 1st Reconnaissance Squadron "Cavalleggeri Guide", which was assigned to the IX Assault Unit of the II Brigade of the Italian Liberation Corps. Both units, the 14th Combat Supply Unit "Guide" and the 1st Reconnaissance Squadron "Cavalleggeri Guide", were disbanded after the end of World War II.

=== Cold War ===
On 1 April 1949, the Italian Army formed the Armored Cavalry Squadron "Guide" in Tor di Quinto, which moved the same year to Casarsa della Delizia. The squadron was equipped with M8 Greyhound armored cars and assigned to the Armored Brigade "Ariete" as the brigade's reconnaissance unit. On 1 October 1952, the Armored Brigade "Ariete" was expanded to Armored Division "Ariete" and, consequently, on 25 November 1953, the Armored Cavalry Squadron "Guide" was expanded to Squadrons Group "Cavalleggeri Guide". In October 1963, the squadrons group's troops were sent to Longarone to help rescue efforts after the Vajont dam disaster. For its conduct in Longarone the squadrons group was awarded a Silver Medal of Civil Valor. On 20 May 1965, the squadrons group was temporarily entrusted with the standard of the Regiment "Cavalleggeri Guide" (19th).

During the 1975 army reform the army disbanded the regimental level and newly independent battalions were granted for the first time their own flags, respectively in the case of cavalry units, their own standard. On 1 July 1975, the squadrons group was renamed 19th Squadrons Group "Cavalleggeri Guide". The squadrons group remained the reconnaissance unit of the Armored Division "Ariete" and consisted of a command, a command and services squadron, and three reconnaissance squadrons equipped with Fiat Campagnola reconnaissance vehicles, M113 armored personnel carriers, and M47 Patton tanks. At the time the squadrons group fielded 667 men (36 officers, 105 non-commissioned officers, and 526 soldiers).

On 12 November 1976, the President of the Italian Republic Giovanni Leone assigned with decree 846 the standard and traditions of the Regiment "Cavalleggeri Guide" (19th) to the squadrons group. For its conduct and work after the 1976 Friuli earthquake the squadrons group was awarded a Silver Medal of Army Valor, which was affixed to the squadrons group's standard and added to its coat of arms. In 1980, the squadrons group replaced its M47 Patton tanks with Leopard 1A2 main battle tanks.

In 1986, the Italian Army abolished the divisional level and brigades, which until then had been under one of the Army's four divisions, came under direct command of the army's 3rd Army Corps or 5th Army Corps. On 30 September 1986, the Armored Division "Ariete" was disbanded and the next day, on 1 October 1986, the 19th Squadrons Group "Cavalleggeri Guide" was assigned to the 32nd Armored Brigade "Mameli", as one of two reconnaissance units of the 5th Army Corps.

=== Recent times ===
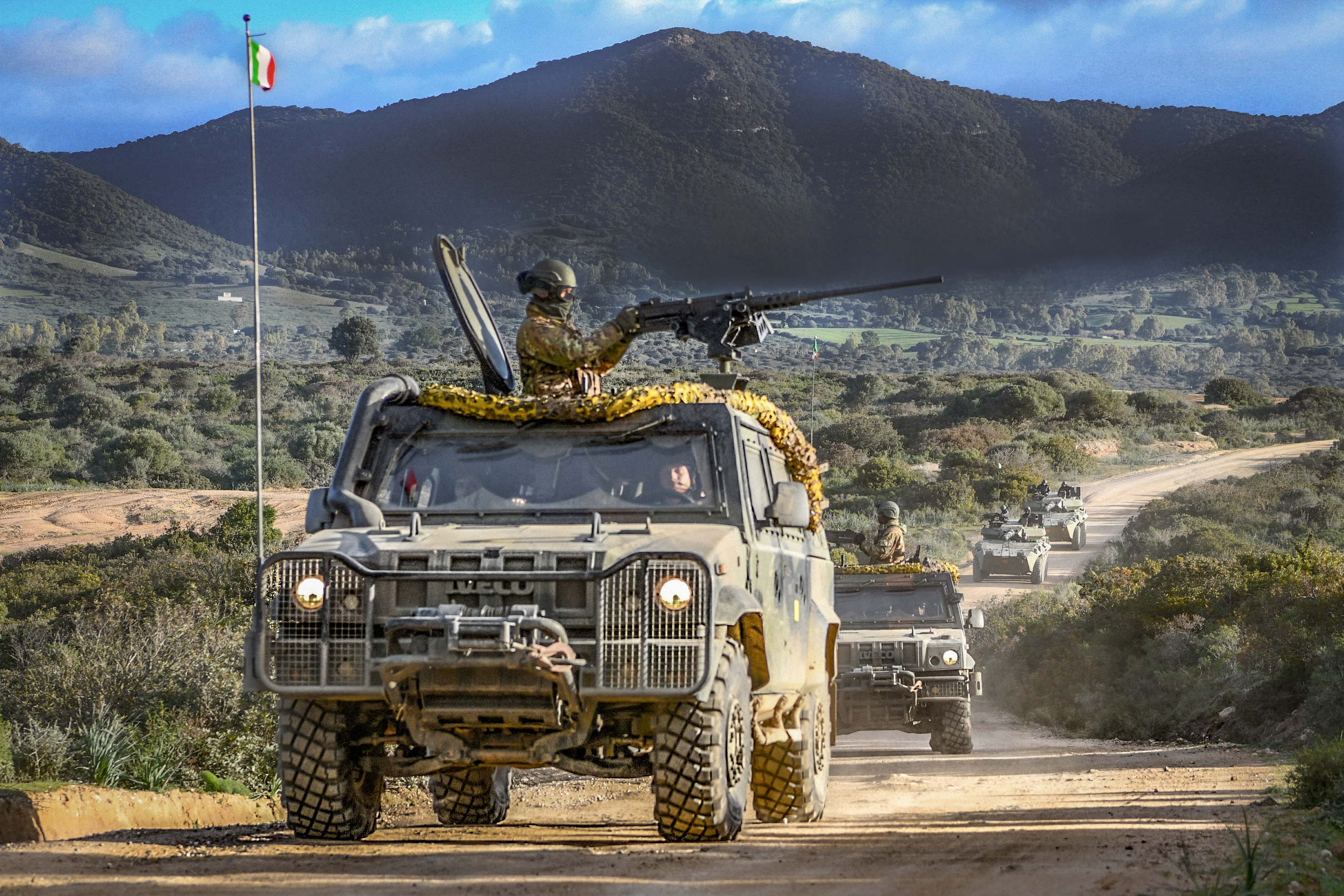
Regiment "Cavalleggeri Guide" (19th) reconnaissance platoon

After the end of the Cold War the Italian Army began to draw down its forces. On 1 April 1991, the 32nd Armored Brigade "Mameli" was disbanded, while the 19th Squadrons Group "Cavalleggeri Guide" moved from Casarsa della Delizia to Salerno in the South of Italy. On 1 July 1991, the 8th Bersaglieri Brigade "Garibaldi" moved from Pordenone to Caserta in southern Italy and the squadrons group joined the brigade on the same day. On 4 August 1991, the 19th Squadrons Group "Cavalleggeri Guide" lost its autonomy and the next day the squadrons group entered the 19th Regiment "Cavalleggeri Guide". On the same day, the standard and traditions of the Regiment "Cavalleggeri Guide" (19th) were transferred from the squadrons group to the 19th Regiment "Cavalleggeri Guide". On 3 September 1992, the regiment was renamed Regiment "Cavalleggeri Guide" (19th). The regiment consisted of a command, a command and services squadron, and a squadrons group with three squadrons with wheeled Centauro tank destroyers.

Between December 1992 and June 1993, the regiment deployed four platoons to Somalia for the Unified Task Force mission and the following United Nations Operation in Somalia II. Two of the platoons were equipped with Centauro tank destroyers, while the other two fielded the entire complement of the Italian Army's CM6616 infantry fighting vehicles. Starting from January 1996, the regiment's squadrons rotated to Bosnia and Herzegovina for Operation Joint Endeavour and then NATO's Implementation Force. Between March and July 1997, one of the regiment's squadrons participated in Operation Alba in Albania.

In December 1998, the regiment deployed to Macedonia for the planned NATO-led invasion of Kosovo during the Kosovo War. After the signing of the Kumanovo Agreement between the Kosovo Force and the Federal Republic of Yugoslavia and Republic of Serbia, the regiment entered Kosovo as part of the Italian contingent. The regiment remained in Kosovo until 7 September 1999. For its conduct in Kosovo the regiment was awarded a Gold Medal of Army Valor, which was affixed to the regiment's standard and added to the regiment's coat of arms.

In 2002, the regiment's 3rd Squadron deployed to Afghanistan, while the regiment's 1st and 2nd squadrons returned to Kosovo. In 2003, the regiment's 4th Heavy Armored Squadron deployed to Iraq. In 2004, the regiment deployed to Iraq with three of its squadrons. On 4 November 2000, the President of the Italian Republic Sergio Mattarella decorated the regiment's standard with the Military Order of Italy for its conduct in the regiment's many missions abroad between 1993 and 2018.

== Organization ==
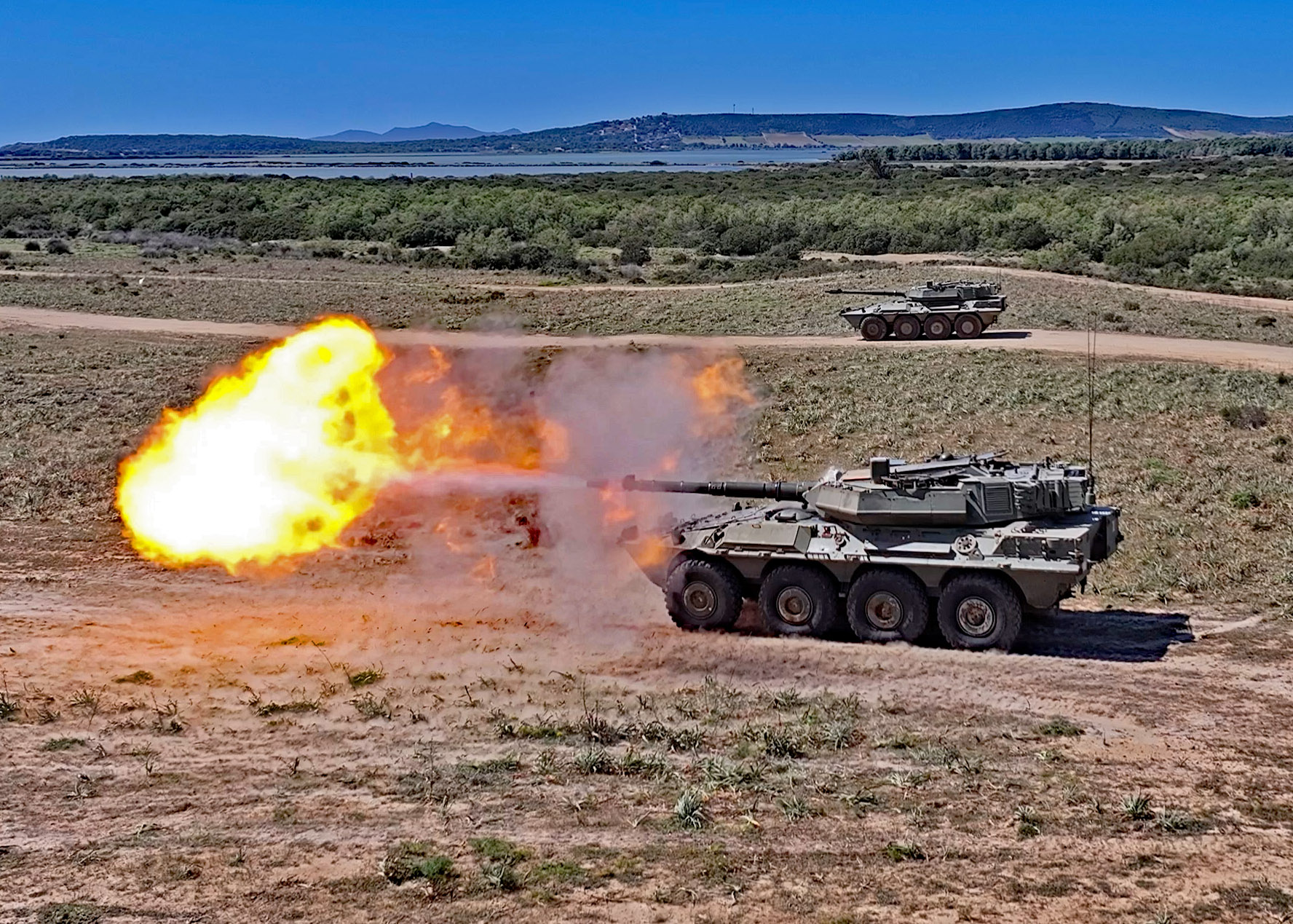
Regiment "Cavalleggeri Guide" (19th) Centauro tank destroyers during exercise "Alfiere d’Acciaio" 2025

As of 2024 the Regiment "Cavalleggeri Guide" (19th) is organized as follows:

- Regiment "Cavalleggeri Guide" (19th), in Salerno
  - Command and Logistic Support Squadron
  - 1st Reconnaissance Squadrons Group
    - 1st Reconnaissance Squadron "San Marco"
    - 2nd Reconnaissance Squadron "San Giusto"
    - 3rd Reconnaissance Squadron "San Martino"
    - 4th Heavy Armored Squadron "San Giorgio"

The three reconnaissance squadrons are equipped with Lince vehicles and Centauro tank destroyers, which are scheduled to be replaced by Lince 2 vehicles and Freccia EVO Reconnaissance vehicles. The Heavy Armored Squadron is equipped with Centauro tank destroyers, which are being replaced by Centauro 2 tank destroyers.

== See also ==
- Bersaglieri Brigade "Garibaldi"
