= Regiment "Lancieri di Novara" (5th) =

Active Italian Army lancer unit

- Reggimento "Lancieri di Novara" (5°)
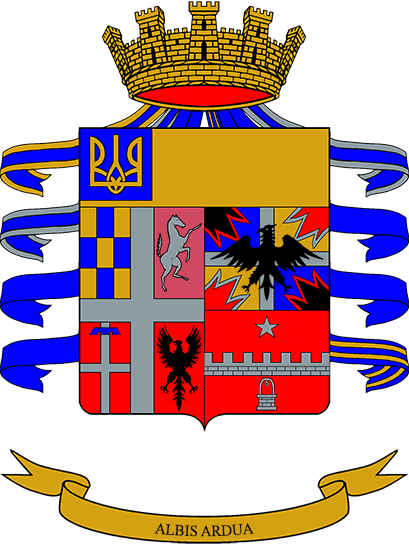
- Regimental coat of arms
- Active: 24 Dec. 1828 — 17 Sept. 1943; 1 Feb. 1949 — 30 Sept. 1964; 1 Nov. 1975 — today
- Country: Italy
- Branch: Italian Army
- Part of: 132nd Armored Brigade "Ariete"
- Garrison/HQ: Codroipo
- Motto: "Albis ardua"
- Anniversaries: 27 August 1942 - Battle of the Don
- Decorations: 1× Gold Medal of Military Valor; 2× Silver Medals of Military Valor; 4× Bronze Medals of Military Valor; 1× Bronze Medal of Army Valor; 1× Gold Cross of Army Merit; 1× Silver Cross of Army Merit

Commanders
- Notable commanders: Prince Amedeo, Duke of Aosta; Prince Vittorio Emanuele, Count of Turin

Insignia
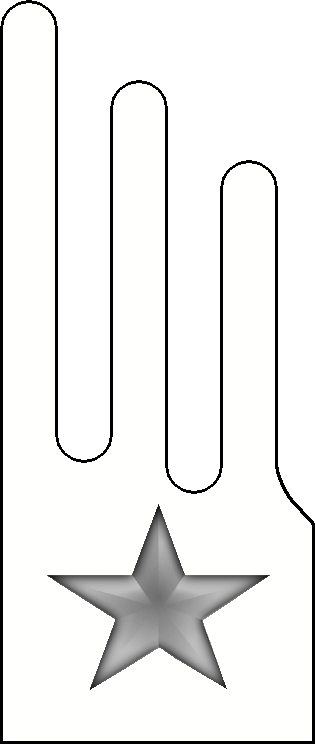
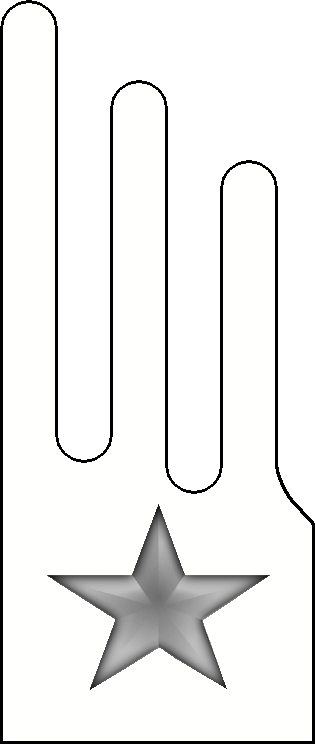
- Regimental gorget patches

The Regiment "Lancieri di Novara" (5th) (Italian: Reggimento "Lancieri di Novara" (5°) - "Lancers of Novara") is a cavalry unit of the Italian Army based in Codroipo in Friuli-Venezia Giulia. The regiment is the reconnaissance unit of the 132nd Armored Brigade "Ariete". In December 1828, the Royal Sardinian Army formed a Dragoons regiment, which was named for the region of Piedmont. In 1832, the regiment was renamed Regiment "Novara Cavalleria". In 1845, the regiment's troops were armed with lances. In 1848-49, the regiment fought in the First Italian War of Independence, during which it distinguished itself in the Battle of Santa Lucia, for which the regiment was awarded a Bronze Medal of Military Valor. During the Second Italian War of Independence the regiment distinguished itself in the Battle of Montebello, for which it was awarded its second Bronze Medal of Military Valor. On 6 June 1860, the regiment joined the new Lancers speciality and was renamed Regiment "Lancieri di Novara". In the 1860-1861, during the Sardinian campaign in central and southern Italy the regiment distinguished itself in the Battle of Castelfidardo, while the regiment's 1st Squadron distinguished itself in the Battle of Macerone Pass. For these feats of arms the regiment was awarded its third and fourth Bronze Medal of Military Valor. In 1866, the regiment fought in the Third Italian War of Independence and in 1870 participated in the capture of Rome.

During World War I the regiment formed together with the Regiment "Genova Cavalleria" (4th) the II Cavalry Brigade of the 1st Cavalry Division "Friuli". In 1916, the two regiments fought dismounted in the trenches of the Italian Front. In October 1917, after the Italian defeat in the Battle of Caporetto, the II Cavalry Brigade stalled, together with the Brigade "Bergamo", the Austro-Hungarian advance in the Battle of Pozzuolo del Friuli, which allowed the Italian 3rd Army to retreat intact over the Tagliamento river. For their conduct at Pozzuolo del Friuli both regiments of the II Cavalry Brigade were awarded a Silver Medal of Military Valor.

During World War II the regiment was assigned together with the Regiment "Savoia Cavalleria" to the 3rd Cavalry Division "Principe Amedeo Duca d'Aosta", which in spring 1941 fought in the invasion of Yugoslavia. In summer 1941, the 3rd Cavalry Division "Principe Amedeo Duca d'Aosta" was assigned to the Italian Expeditionary Corps in Russia, which was sent to Ukraine to fight in the German invasion of the Soviet Union. In October and November 1941, the regiment fought in the Battle of Stalino (today Donetsk) and the battle for control of Horlivka. In July 1942, the regiment fought in the Battle of Krasnyi Luch. In late August 1942, the regiment defend the right flank of the 2nd Infantry Division "Sforzesca", during which the regiment's 2nd Squadron conducted a cavalry charge to disperse attacking Red Army infantry. For its conduct in July and August 1942, the regiment was awarded Italy's highest military honor the Gold Medal of Military Valor. In December 1942, the regiment was almost annihilated during the Soviet Operation Little Saturn and subsequently the regiment's surviving troops were repatriated. After the announcement of the Armistice of Cassibile on 8 September 1943, the remnants of the regiment were disbanded by invading German forces.

In December 1946, the Italian Army formed the 5th Lancers Reconnaissance Group, which received the regiment's traditions and white gorget patches. In 1949, the group was expanded to 5th Armored Cavalry Regiment "Lancieri di Novara" and equipped with M26 Pershing tanks. In 1957, the regiment was assigned to the newly formed Cavalry Brigade. In 1964, the regiment was reduced to Squadrons Group "Lancieri di Novara" and reorganized as a reconnaissance unit. In 1975, the squadrons group was reorganized and renamed 5th Tank Squadrons Group "Lancieri di Novara". The squadrons group was equipped with Leopard 1A2 main battle tanks and assigned the traditions and standard of the Regiment "Lancieri di Novara" (5th). In 1992, the squadrons group lost its autonomy and entered the reformed Regiment "Lancieri di Novara" (5th). In January 2013, the regiment was assigned to the 132nd Armored Brigade "Ariete" as the brigade's reconnaissance unit.

The regiment's anniversary falls on 27 August 1942, to commemorate the regiment's conduct during the battles at Yagodnyi to the South of the Don river between 21 and 30 August 1942, for which the regiment was awarded Italy's highest military honor the Gold Medal of Military Valor. As the regiment is a lancer unit, its enlisted personnel is addressed as "Lancer" (Italian: Lanciere).

== History ==
=== Formation ===
On 24 December 1828, the Regiment "Dragoni di Piemonte" (Regiment Dragoons of Piedmont) was formed in Vigevano with personnel drawn from four existing Royal Sardinian Army cavalry regiments: Regiment "Piemonte Reale Cavalleria", Regiment "Cavalleggeri di Piemonte", Regiment "Cavalleggeri di Savoia", and Regiment "Dragoni del Génévois". The new regiment received untamed horses directly from the army's herds and fielded 900 dragoons and 784 horses in eight squadrons, which were grouped in four divisions. The regiment's troops were armed with a flintlock musket, two flintlock pistols, and a sabre.

On 29 August 1831, all five Royal Sardinian Army cavalry regiments were reduced from eight to six squadrons and a depot squadron, which was to be formed in wartime and train new recruits. On 3 November of the same year, the personnel of the disbanded squadrons was used to reform the Regiment "Aosta Cavalleria". On 3 January 1832, the six Royal Sardinian Army cavalry regiments were renamed uniformly as "Cavalleria". On the same date the Regiment "Dragoni di Piemonte" was renamed Regiment "Novara Cavalleria" for the city of Novara. The troops of five regiments, including the Regiment "Novara Cavalleria", were equipped with a flintlock musket, two flintlock pistols, and a sabre, while the troops of the Regiment "Piemonte Reale Cavalleria" continued to be equipped with a flintlock musket, two flintlock pistols, and a straight cavalry sword. With the name change the identifying color of the Regiment "Novara Cavalleria" was defined as orange, but in 1839 it was changed to white, which is still used as the color of the regiment's gorget patches today.

On 7 March 1835, the six cavalry regiments were grouped into two brigades: the I Brigade consisted of the regiments "Nizza Cavalleria", "Savoia Cavalleria" and "Novara Cavalleria", while the II Brigade consisted of the regiments "Piemonte Reale Cavalleria", "Genova Cavalleria" and "Aosta Cavalleria". On 15 March 1836, the 6th Squadron of all six cavalry regiments was reorganized as a depot squadron. During the same year the troops of one squadron of each regiment, with the exception of the Regiment “Piemonte Reale Cavalleria”, replaced their flintlock musket with a lance. On 4 October of the same year, the number of brigades was increased from two to three and the regiments were reassigned: the I Brigade consisted now of the regiments "Nizza Cavalleria" and "Genova Cavalleria", the II Brigade of the regiments "Piemonte Reale Cavalleria" and "Novara Cavalleria", and the III Brigade of the regiments "Savoia Cavalleria" and "Aosta Cavalleria".

In 1841, all six regiments were uniformly organized and equipped: the troops of the regiments' first four squadrons were equipped with a flintlock musket, two flintlock pistols, and a sabre, while the troops of the regiments' fifth squadron were equipped with a lance, two flintlock pistols, and a sabre. On 1 January 1842, the six regiments disbanded their depot squadrons. In 1843, each regiments equipped a second squadron with lances. On 17 March 1845, all six regiments replaced their flintlock muskets and flintlock pistols with a percussion pistolone — a pistol with a shoulder stock and were issued lances. Afterwards all of the regiment's troops were equipped with a lance, a pistolone and a sabre.

=== Italian Wars of Independence ===
==== First Italian War of Independence ====
In 1848 revolutionary riots broke out in many parts of Europe, including numerous places in Italy. In March 1848, the revolts also spread into the Austrian Empire, where Milan (Five Days of Milan) and Venice (Republic of San Marco) rebelled against the House of Habsburg. The battles were particularly heated in Milan, where the commander of the army of Lombardy–Venetia, Marshal Josef Radetzky, was forced to abandon the city. As a result of this, other revolts broke out in Lombardy–Venetia. With Vienna itself in revolt, the Austrian Empire was tottering. On 23 March, one day after the end of the Five Days of Milan, King Charles Albert of Sardinia declared war on Austria. Thus began the First Italian War of Independence.

On the same day King Charles Albert declared war the Royal Sardinian Army's six cavalry regiments reformed their depot squadrons. At the start of the campaign the cavalry's I Brigade was attached to the I Army Corps, while the II Brigade was attached to the II Army Corps, while the III Brigade was attached to the army reserve division. On 25 March 1848, King Charles Albert ordered to issue all cavalry regiments a 60 cm wide square standard in the colors of the Italian flag with the arms of Savoy displayed in the center of the white pale. On 9 April 1848, the Regiment "Novara Cavalleria" clashed with Austrian forces at Monzambano, followed by combat at Mantua and Villafranca, and the Skirmish of Pastrengo on 30 April 1848. On 6 May, the regiment distinguished itself in the Battle of Santa Lucia. On 23 and 24 July, the Regiment "Novara Cavalleria" fought at Sommacampagna and the next day in the Battle of Custoza. On 27 July, the regiment fought in the Battle of Volta Mantovana, after which King Charles Albert ordered a retreat towards Milan. On 9 August, the Austrian General Heinrich von Heß and the Sardinian General Carlo Canera di Salasco signed the Armistice of Salasco, which stated that Charles Albert's troops would withdraw from the whole of the Kingdom of Lombardy–Venetia, and the Duchy of Parma and Piacenza and Duchy of Modena and Reggio. Thus ended the war's First Campaign.

On 1 March 1849, the Sardinian Chamber of Deputies voted for the resumption of the war, with 94 votes in favour and 24 against. King Charles Albert decided that hostilities would resume on 20 March and, as stipulated in the 1848 armistice, the Austrians were informed about the continuation of the war eight days before the hostilities resumed. Charles Albert then massed his army near Novara. At noon on 20 March, the whole Austrian Army crossed the Ticino river at Pavia and marched North towards Mortara and Vigevano. On 23 March 1849, Field Marshal Radetzky decisively defeated the Sardinians in the Battle of Novara. In the evening of 23 March, King Charles Albert abdicated in favour of his son Victor Emmanuel. On 24 March, the new king met with Radetzky at Vignale and agreed to an armistice, which ended the short Second Campaign of the First Italian War of Independence.

For its conduct in the Battle of Santa Lucia the Regiment "Novara Cavalleria" was awarded a Bronze Medal of Military Valor, which was affixed to the regiment's standard.

After the defeat in the First Italian War of Independence the Kingdom of Sardinia reformed its military and, on 3 January 1850, the Regiment "Novara Cavalleria" was transferred, together with the Regiment "Aosta Cavalleria", to the light cavalry and reorganized as a Chevau-léger unit. Consequently the regiment was renamed Regiment "Cavalleggeri di Novara". On the same date, the regiment ceded its 5th and 6th squadrons to help from the Regiment "Cavalleggeri di Alessandria". After the reorganization the regiment consisted of a staff, four Chevau-léger squadrons, and a depot squadron. As part of the reorganization the regiment's troops replaced their Dragoon helmets with a white kepi and were now armed with musket, pistol, and sabre.

On 22 September 1852, the Sardinian War Ministry ordered that the four line cavalry regiments, as well as the regiments "Cavalleggeri di Novara" and "Cavalleggeri di Aosta" should be armed with lance, sabre and pistolone. Consequently, the regiment's troops were once again issued lances, even though the regiment remained assigned to the army's light cavalry.

On 31 March 1855, the regiment's 1st Squadron was assigned to the Provisional Cavalry Regiment for the Sardinian expeditionary corps, which deployed to Crimea for the Crimean War. On 16 August 1855, the Provisional Cavalry Regiment fought in the Battle of the Chernaya. After the Crimean War the regiment was repatriated and, on 18 June 1856, disbanded and its squadrons returned to their original regiments.

==== Second Italian War of Independence ====
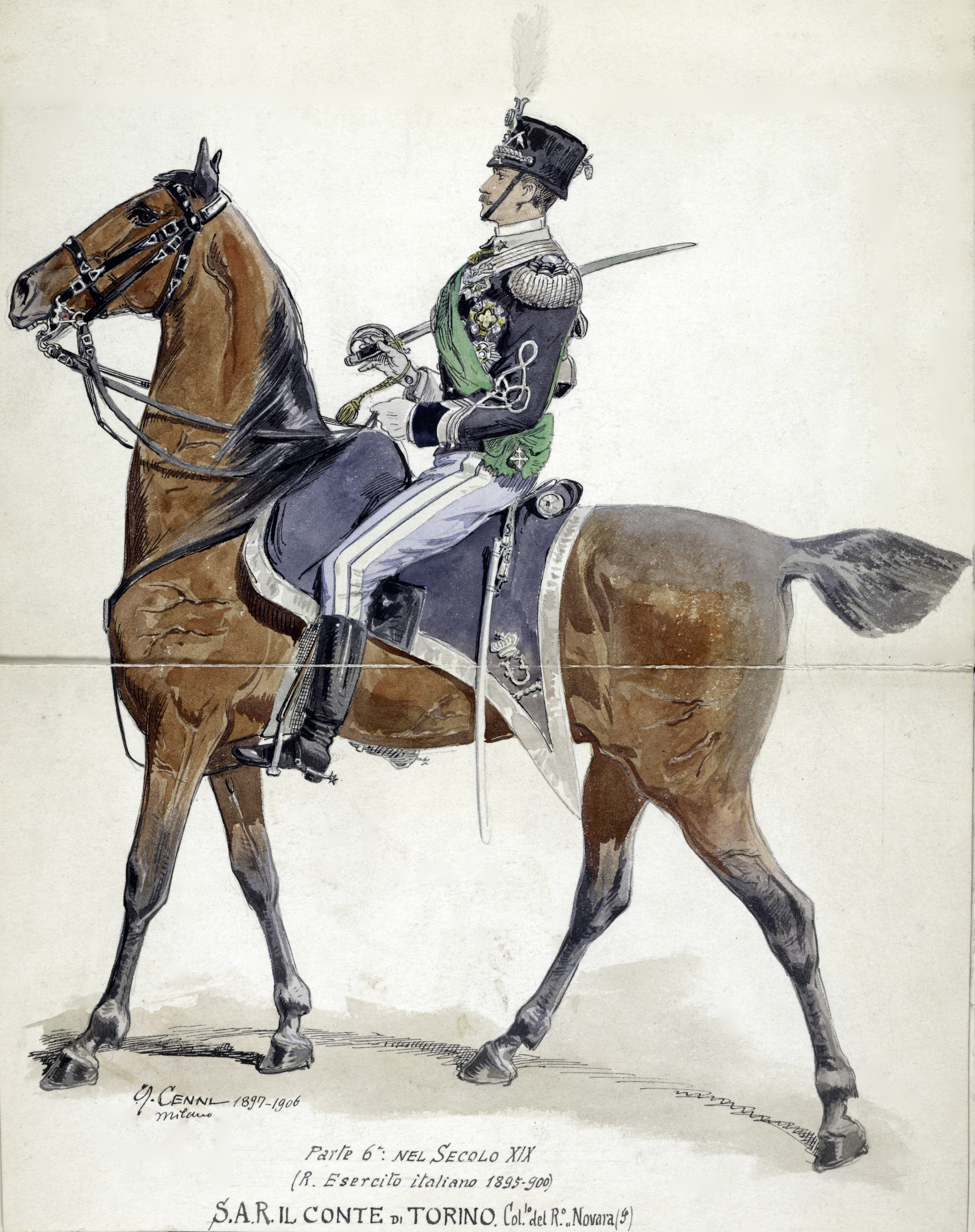
Regiment "Lancieri di Novara" commanding officer in the regiment's uniform

On 21 July 1858, French Emperor Napoleon III and the Prime Minister of Sardinia Camillo Benso, Count of Cavour met in Plombières and reached a secret verbal agreement on a military alliance between the French Empire and the Kingdom of Sardinia against the Austrian Empire. On 9 March 1859, Sardinia mobilized its army, followed by Austria on 9 April. On 23 April, Austria delivered an ultimatum to Sardinia demanding its demobilization. Upon Sardinia's refusal, Austria declared war on 26 April and three days later the Austrians crossed the Ticino river into Piedmont. Consequently, France honored its alliance with Sardinia and declared war on Austria on 3 May 1859, which led to the Second Italian War of Independence.

On 20 May, the Imperial Austrian Army's V Corps under Feldmarschall-leutnant Philipp von Stadion und Thannhausen advanced in three columns towards Voghera, where the French 1st Division under General Élie Frédéric Forey and a Sardinian cavalry brigade under Colonel Maurizio Gerbaix de Sonnaz were based. The Sardinian cavalry brigade consisted of three squadrons of the Regiment "Cavalleggeri di Novara", four squadrons of the Regiment "Cavalleggeri di Aosta", and the 3rd and 4th squadrons of the Regiment "Cavalleggeri di Monferrato". As soon as General Forey was informed of the Austrian advance, he ordered his division to march towards the enemy, which led to the Battle of Montebello. Around 14:00, the French 84th Infantry Regiment blocked the Austrian's left column at Genestrello to the West of Montebello, while the regiments "Cavalleggeri di Novara" and "Cavalleggeri di Monferrato" charged the Austrian column, which was forced to form squares. At the same time two French infantry battalions and the Regiment "Cavalleggeri di Aosta" stopped the advance of the Austrian right column at Casatisma. By 15:00, General Forey ordered one of his brigades to commence a frontal attack on the Austrian position in Montebello, while the division's second brigade would begin a maneuver to envelop the Austrians from the South. Between 16:00 and 17:00, General Forey dismounted and personally led his men up the hill to Montebello, while the Sardinian cavalry regiments continued to charge the Austrians. By 18:30, the village of Montebello was cleared of Austrian forces and Feldmarschall-leutnant von Stadion ordered his corps to fall back.

On 11 July 1859, Emperor Napoleon III and Emperor Franz Joseph I met at Villafranca and concluded the Armistice of Villafranca, which ended the war. After the conclusion of the armistice the French and Sardinian armies occupied Lombardy. On 16 September 1859, the Royal Sardinian Army's nine cavalry regiments ceded one squadron each to help form three new Chevau-légers regiments and the three squadrons ceded by the cavalry regiments "Cavalleggeri di Novara", "Cavalleggeri di Aosta" and "Cavalleggeri di Monferrato", which had distinguished themselves in the Battle of Montebello four months earlier, were used to form the Regiment "Cavalleggeri di Montebello" — the only Italian cavalry regiment named for a battle.

For its conduct in the Battle of Montebello and the during the war's campaign, the Regiment "Cavalleggeri di Novara" was awarded a Bronze Medal of Military Valor, which was affixed to the regiment's standard. On 6 June 1860, the Sardinian War Ministry ordered that the army's cavalry regiments, which were equipped with lances — with the exception of the four line cavalry regiments — were to join the new Lancers speciality. Consequently, on the same day, the Regiment "Cavalleggeri di Novara" was renamed Regiment "Lancieri di Novara".

On 5 May 1860, Giuseppe Garibaldi's Expedition of the Thousand set off, with the support of the Sardinian government, from Genoa and landed on 11 May in Marsala in Sicily. On 15 May 1860, Garibaldi won the Battle of Calatafimi and the Sardinian government decided to send reinforcements to Sicily. This in turn triggered the Sardinian campaign in central and southern Italy, which commenced on 11 September 1860 with the Sardinian invasion of the papal states. On the first day of the campaign, the Regiment "Lancieri di Novara" fought in the capture of Pesaro. One week later, on 18 September 1860, the regiment distinguished itself the Battle of Castelfidardo against the papal forces. From 23 to 29 September, the regiment participated in the Siege of Ancona. On 20 October 1860, the regiment's 1st Squadron distinguished itself at the Battle of Macerone Pass, during which the squadron captured the flag of the 8th Line Jäger Battalion of the Army of the Two Sicilies. On 26 October, the regiment fought in the Battle of San Giuliano and three days later in the decisive Battle of the Garigliano.

After the successful conclusion of Garibaldi's Expedition of the Thousand the Kingdom of Sardinia annexed the Kingdom of the Two Sicilies and most of the Papal Legations. On 17 March 1861, King Victor Emmanuel II proclaimed himself King of Italy.

For its conduct in the Battle of Castelfidardo and the during the campaign in central and southern Italy, the Regiment "Lancieri di Novara" was awarded a Bronze Medal of Military Valor, while the regiment's 1st Squadron was awarded a Bronze Medal of Military Valor for the squadron's conduct in the Battle of Macerone Pass. Both medals were affixed to the regiment's standard.

On 16 February 1864, the regiment ceded its 2nd Squadron to help form the Regiment "Lancieri di Foggia".

==== Third Italian War of Independence ====
In 1866, during the Third Italian War of Independence, the regiment formed, together with the Regiment "Ussari di Piacenza", the Cavalry Brigade of the II Corps of the Army of the Mincio, which operated along the Mincio river. On 24 June 1866, the II Corps remained in reserve during the Battle of Custoza. After the battle the regiment was sent to cover the retreat of the forces of the Italian I Corps and III Corps.

In September 1870, the regiment supported the Reserve Division, which supported the Italian invasion of the Papal States during the Capture of Rome. On 10 September 1871, the regiment was renamed 5th Cavalry Regiment (Novara), and on 5 November 1876, Cavalry Regiment "Novara" (5th). In 1887, the regiment provided personnel and horses for the formation of the Mounted Hunters Squadron, which fought in the Italo-Ethiopian War of 1887–1889. In 1895-96, the regiment provided one officer and 75 enlisted for units deployed to Italian Eritrea for the First Italo-Ethiopian War. On 16 December 1897, the regiment was renamed Regiment "Lancieri di Milano" (5th).

On 1 October 1909, the regiment ceded its 3rd Squadron to help form the Regiment "Lancieri di Vercelli" (26th). In 1911–12, the regiment provided 41 enlisted to units deployed for the Italo-Turkish War.

=== World War I ===
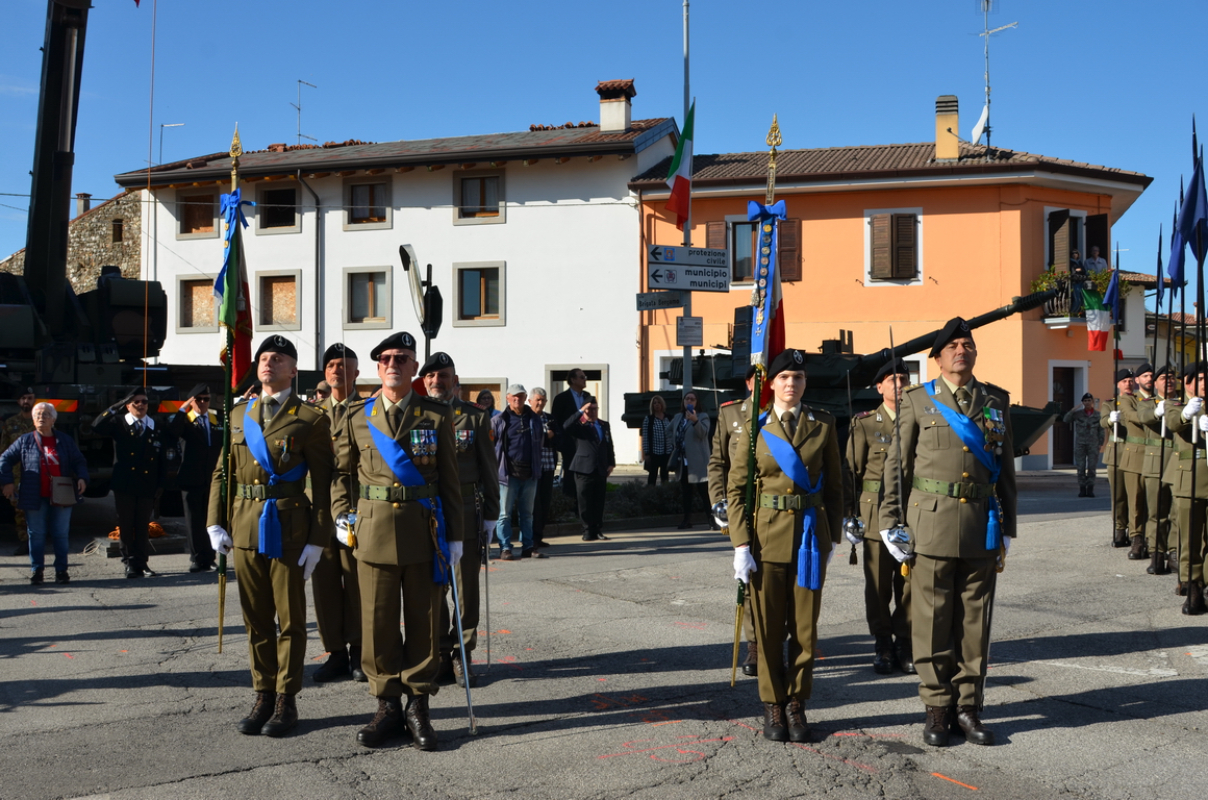
Regiment "Genova Cavalleria" (4th) and Regiment "Lancieri di Novara" (5th) standards at the 107th anniversary commemoration of the Battle of Pozzuolo del Friuli

At the outbreak of World War I the regiment consisted of a command, a depot, and two cavalry groups, with the I Group consisting of three squadrons and the II Group consisting of two squadrons and a machine gun section. Together with the Regiment "Genova Cavalleria" (4th) the regiment formed the II Cavalry Brigade, which was assigned to the 1st Cavalry Division "Friuli". In April 1916, the division was dismounted for service in the trenches of the Italian front. After being dismounted the regiment was reinforced by the dismounted 2nd Squadron of the Regiment "Cavalleggeri di Lodi" (15th). On 11 May 1916, the 1st Cavalry Division "Friuli" entered the trenches at Plave in the center of the Isonzo front. In late July 1916, the 1st Cavalry Division "Friuli" and 4th Cavalry Division "Piemonte" switched places on the front, with the 1st Cavalry Division "Friuli" entering the trenches at Monfalcone below the Karst plateau, while the 4th Cavalry Division "Piemonte" entered the trenches at Plave. From 4 to 12 August 1916, the 1st Cavalry Division "Friuli" fought in the Sixth Battle of the Isonzo at Monfalcone, during which the Regiment "Lancieri di Novara" (5th) attacked towards Mount Košnik. In September 1916, the 1st Cavalry Division fought again at Monfalcone during the Seventh Battle of the Isonzo. In December 1916, the 1st Cavalry Division "Friuli" was mounted on horses again and held in reserve.

In 1917, the regiment's depot in Treviso formed the 735th Dismounted Machine Gunners Company as reinforcement for the regiment and the 1354th Dismounted Machine Gunners Company as an independent unit. On 24 October 1917, the Imperial German Army and Austro-Hungarian Army began the Battle of Caporetto and already on the first day of the battle the German 14th Army broke through the Italian lines at Kobarid. All mounted Italian cavalry regiments were sent forward to cover the retreat of the Italian 2nd Army and 3rd Army from the Isonzo front. To keep the 3rd Army's path to the Tagliamento river bridges at Codroipo and at Latisana open the II Cavalry Brigade under Brigadier General Emo Capodilista and the infantry Brigade "Bergamo" under Colonel Piero Balbi were sent to Pozzuolo del Friuli and ordered to delay the enemy. The cavalry units arrived in Pozzuolo in the late afternoon of 29 October. A roll call on the morning of 30 October showed that the cavalry brigade consisted of 968 men. By 11h the first enemy vanguards arrived opposite the Italian line and 1 hour later the 4th Squadron of the Regiment "Lancieri di Novara" (5th) charged the flank of the Austro-Hungarian forces, which retreated. Around the same time the Brigade "Bergamo" arrived in Pozzuolo and the commanders of the two brigades decided that the II Battalion of the 25th Infantry Regiment and III Battalion of the 26th Infantry Regiment would defend Pozzuolo, while the "Lancieri di Novara" would cover the left and the "Genova Cavalleria" the right flank of Pozzuolo. The remainder of the Brigade "Bergamo" would continue to Carpeneto and block the road to Codroipo there.

Around 14h three Austro-Hungarian and German divisions attacked the Italian line: the German 5th Infantry Division attacked Carpeneto, while the Austrio-Hungarian 60th Infantry Division attacked Pozzuolo, and the German 117th Infantry Division attacked the "Genova Cavalleria". With the "Genova Cavalleria" under heavy attack the lancers of the Regiment "Lancieri di Novara" (5th) began to harass the left flank of the enemy in repeated cavalry charges. By 17:30 the cavalry brigade had suffered almost 400 dead and the enemy had entered Pozzuolo. Around 18h General Capodilista ordered his troops to disengage and retreat. Colonel Balbi and the "Bergamo" troops chose to stay in Pozzuolo to cover the retreat. Fifteen minutes later the remnants of the II Cavalry Brigade rode in formation south towards Santa Maria di Sclaunicco. The last cavalry unit to leave Pozzuolo was the 4th Squadron of the "Genova Cavalleria", which executed a last suicidal charge against the enemy to cover the other units' escape. By nightfall the Regiment "Lancieri di Novara" (5th) had lost 186 men, while the Regiment "Genova Cavalleria" (4th) had lost 281 men. In total the II Cavalry Brigade lost 467 of its 968 men, while the Brigade "Bergamo" lost more than 3,500 men. Ultimately however, the Battle of Pozzuolo was a success as it bought the Italian 3rd Army the time to escape across the Tagliamento river.

On 31 October 1917, the remnants of Regiment "Lancieri di Novara" (5th) assembled in Ariis. The same day the regiment crossed the Tagliamento river and retreated to Azzano Decimo. Afterwards the regiment fell back to the new Italian line along the Piave river, where it took up positions along the river at Lovadina.

On 24 October 1918, the Royal Italian Army began the Battle of Vittorio Veneto and on 29 October the Regiment "Lancieri di Novara" (5th) crossed the Piave river at the island of Grave di Papadopoli. The next day, on 30 October, the regiment, like all cavalry regiments, was ordered to pursue the retreating Austro-Hungarian armies. The regiment advanced to Fiaschetti, where it captured the bridge over the Livenza river. The regiment then advanced to Maniago, crossed the Tagliamento river and then reached Pinzano. On 2 November 1918, the regiment reached Carnia, where it captured the retreating Austro-Hungarian 34th Infantry Division.

For their conduct at Pozzuolo del Friuli the two regiments of the II Cavalry Brigade, "Genova Cavalleria" (4th) and "Lancieri di Novara" (5th), were both awarded a Silver Medal of Military Valor, which were affixed to the two regiments' standards.

=== Interwar years ===
After the war the Royal Italian Army disbanded the second groups of all thirty cavalry regiments, while the first groups were reduced to two squadrons. On 21 November 1919, 14 cavalry regiments were disbanded and their groups transferred to 14 of the remaining cavalry regiments. One of the disbanded regiments was the Regiment "Cavalleggeri di Piacenza" (18th), whose remaining group was renamed II Squadrons Group "Cavalleggeri di Piacenza". Afterwards, the squadrons group, which remained based in Caserta and retained the disbanded regiment's standard, joined the Regiment "Lancieri di Novara" (5th).

On 20 May 1920, the Royal Italian Army disbanded five additional cavalry regiments, among them the Regiment "Lancieri di Milano" (7th), whose 4th Squadron, which was part of the II Squadrons Group "Cavalleggeri di Roma", was transferred to the Regiment "Lancieri di Novara" (5th). On the same date, the II Squadrons Group "Cavalleggeri di Piacenza" and one of the squadrons group's squadrons were disbanded. Furthermore the Regiment "Lancieri di Novara" (5th) retired its lances and was renamed Regiment "Cavalleggeri di Novara". On 1 July 1920, the traditions and standard of the Regiment "Cavalleggeri di Piacenza" (18th) were entrusted to the Regiment "Cavalleggeri di Novara". In 1921, the regiment moved from Treviso to Parma. On 24 May 1925, the standard of the disbanded Regiment "Cavalleggeri di Piacenza" (18th) was transferred to the Shrine of the Flags, which at the time was located in Castel Sant'Angelo, for safekeeping.

In 1932, the regiment moved from Parma to Padua. On 8 February 1934, the regiment was renamed Regiment "Lancieri di Novara". The same year the regiment moved from Padua to Verona. On 1 November 1934, the 3rd Cavalry Division "Principe Amedeo Duca d'Aosta" was formed in Milan. The division consisted of the III Cavalry Brigade "Principe Amedeo Duca d'Aosta" and the 3rd Fast Artillery Regiment "Principe Amedeo Duca d'Aosta". The cavalry brigade consisted of the Regiment "Savoia Cavalleria", Regiment "Lancieri di Novara", 8th Bersaglieri Regiment, and III Light Tanks Group "San Giorgio". In 1935, the regiment formed the XII Fast Tanks Squadron, which was sent to East Africa for the Second Italo-Ethiopian War. The regiment also provided ten officers and 538 enlisted for units deployed for the war. On 1 February 1938, the III Cavalry Brigade "Principe Amedeo Duca d'Aosta" was dissolved and the brigade's regiments came under direct command of the division. On 11 November 1938, the 8th Bersaglieri Regiment left the division and was replaced by the 3rd Bersaglieri Regiment in October 1939.

=== World War II ===
At the outbreak of World War II the regiment was assigned to the 3rd Cavalry Division "Principe Amedeo Duca d'Aosta", which also included the Regiment "Savoia Cavalleria", 3rd Bersaglieri Regiment, 3rd Fast Artillery Regiment "Principe Amedeo Duca d'Aosta", and III Lights Tank Group "San Giorgio". At the time the Regiment "Lancieri di Novara" consisted of a command, a command squadron, the 5th Machine Gunners Squadron, and the I and II squadrons groups, which both consisted of two mounted squadrons. The regiment fielded 37 officers, 37 non-commissioned officers, 798 enlisted troops and 818 horses. The regiment was equipped with one car, six motorcycles, 16 trucks, 36 Breda mod. 30 light machine guns, and 12 Fiat mod. 35 heavy machine guns. The division participated in the Invasion of Yugoslavia. The division then occupied the city of Split in Croatia, where it remained until 31 May 1941.

In July 1941, the 3rd Cavalry Division "Principe Amedeo Duca d'Aosta" was assigned to the Italian Expeditionary Corps in Russia. On 1 July 1941, the division received the newly formed 3rd Horse Artillery Regiment. On 20 July 1941, the division left Italy and on 13 August it arrived in Dniprodzerzhynsk (today Kamianske) on the Dnipro river in central Ukraine. Upon its arrival in Ukraine the Regiment "Lancieri di Novara" fielded 45 officers, 43 non-commissioned officers, 792 troops, and 760 horses. On 23 September 1941, the 9th Infantry Division "Pasubio" crossed the Dnipro river and after the following Battle of Petrikowka the Regiment "Lancieri di Novara" crossed the Dnipro on 4 October and began the pursuit of the retreating Red Army forces. On 17 October, the regiment clashed with Soviet rear guards at Uspenivka outside of Stalino (today Donetsk). From 18 to 23 October, the regiment fought in the Battle of Stalino. From 29 October to 10 November 1941, the regiment fought in the battle to control Horlivka. Between 9 and 14 December 1941, the 3rd Cavalry Division "Principe Amedeo Duca d'Aosta" occupied Ordzhonikidze (today Yenakiieve), Maloorlivka and Petropavlivka to the south-east of Horlivka.

On 25 December 1941, the Soviets launched a counterattack against the 3rd Cavalry Division "Principe Amedeo Duca d'Aosta", with the division's positions in Novoorlivka, and Petropavlivka coming under heavy attack. On 21 January 1942, the regiment's I Squadrons Group was dismounted and sent to aid German forces, engaged in fighting a Soviet attack Oleksandrivka, Oleksandrivka on the Samara river. On 6 February 1942, also the regiment's II Squadrons Group was dismounted and sent to defend the Axis front along the Samara river. On 21 February, the I Squadrons Group's commanding officer Lieutenant Colonel Massimiliano Custoza was killed in action on the Samara and awarded posthumously Italy's highest military honor the Gold Medal of Military Valor.

By early 1942, the Regiment "Lancieri di Novara" had lost 15 officers and 100 lancers and half its horses. On 15 March 1942, the two cavalry regiments, 3rd Horse Artillery Regiment, and III Light Tanks Group "San Giorgio" left the 3rd Cavalry Division "Principe Amedeo Duca d'Aosta" and formed the Horse Troops Grouping. For its conduct and service during its first year on the Eastern Front the Regiment "Lancieri di Novara" was awarded a Silver Medal of Military Valor, which was affixed to the regiment's standard.

In July 1942, the Italian Expeditionary Corps in Russia entered the newly arrived 8th Italian Army. At the same time the regiment received replacement troops and fresh horses from Italy. From 12 to 22 July 1942, the Horse Troops Grouping fought in the Battle of Krasnyi Luch. In early August 1942, the 2nd Infantry Division "Sforzesca" established a bridgehead on the eastern bank of the Don river and advanced along the Khopyor river to the village of Yarskoy 1-y. On 12 August 1942, the "Sforzesca" division was attacked by the Soviet 63rd Army, which consisted of the 197th Rifle Division, 203rd Rifle Division and 14th Guards Rifle Division. The "Sforzesca" division was forced give up the bridgehead and fall back to the villages of Yagodnyi and Chebotarevskii to the South of the Don river. On 20 August, the Horse Troops Grouping was sent to defend Yagodnyi. Over the next two days, the Regiment "Lancieri di Novara" came under heavy Soviet attack. On 22 August, the regiment's 2nd Squadron charged a Soviet attack on horseback and dispersed the enemy troops. On 23 August, the regiment pushed the enemy forces back to the Don, but when enemy reinforcements arrived the regiment was forced to fall back to Chebotarevskii. On 25 August, the regiment fought a delaying action at Kotovskii and the next day the regiment established a defensive position at Bol'shoi. From 27 to 29 August, the regiment, together with the 54th Infantry Regiment "Sforzesca", Skiers Battalion "Monte Cervino" defeated repeated Soviet attacks. The regiment was then reinforced by the Alpini Battalion "Val Chiese" and the I Group of the 17th Artillery Regiment "Sforzesca" and remained on the front in Zuzkan Valley until 23 September.

For its conduct and valour in July 1942 during the Battle of Krasnyi Luch and in August 1942 at Yagodnyi the Regiment "Lancieri di Novara" was awarded a Gold Medal of Military Valor, which was affixed to the regiment's standard.

On 24 September 1942, the regiment was sent to the rear. In November 1942, the regiment's II Squadrons Group, reinforced the 5th Machine Gunners Squadron of the Regiment "Savoia Cavalleria", was attached to the 2nd Alpine Division "Tridentina", which held the front along the Don river. On 12 December 1942, the Red Army commenced Operation Little Saturn, which, in its first stage, attacked and encircled the Italian II Army Corps and XXXV Army Corps, to the southeast of the Alpine Army Corps. On 13 January 1943, the Red Army launched the second stage of Operation Little Saturn with the Voronezh Front encircling and destroying the Hungarian Second Army to the northwest of the Alpine Army Corps.

On the evening of 17 January 1943, the Alpine Army Corps commander, General Gabriele Nasci, ordered a full retreat. At this point only the 2nd Alpine Division "Tridentina" was still capable of conducting combat operations. The 40,000-strong mass of stragglers — Alpini and Italians from other commands, plus German and Hungarians — followed the "Tridentina", which led the way westwards to the new Axis lines. As the Soviets had already occupied every village, bitter battles had to be fought to clear the way. During the retreat, the II Group of the Regiment "Lancieri di Novara" carried out rearguard and flanking actions. On 1 February 1943, the remnants of the Alpine Army Corps reached Axis lines. The Novara's survivors were repatriated on 23 March 1943 and on 30 March the regiment's standard returned to regiment's garrison in Verona.

In July 1943, the regiment moved to Medicina and began the process of being brought back up to full strength. In the evening of 8 September 1943, the Armistice of Cassibile, which ended hostilities between the Kingdom of Italy and the Anglo-American Allies, was announced by General Dwight D. Eisenhower on Radio Algiers and by Marshal Pietro Badoglio on Italian radio. Germany reacted by invading Italy and German forces captured the regiment's two training squadrons in Medicina. The rest of the regiment was disbanded on 17 September 1943, after its officers had hidden the regimental standard.

During the war the regiment's depot in Verona formed the following units:

- III Tank Group "Lancieri di Novara", with L6/40 tanks
- V Machine Gunners Group "Lancieri di Novara"
- V Dismounted Group "Lancieri di Novara"
- VI Dismounted Group "Lancieri di Novara"
- XVI Dismounted Group "Lancieri di Novara"
- XXV Dismounted Group "Lancieri di Novara"

In November 1941, the III Tank Group "Lancieri di Novara" was sent to North Africa, where it fought in the Western Desert Campaign. Immediately after its arrival the group fought in the at Bir el Gubi. In early 1942, the group was attached to the 133rd Armored Division "Littorio", as the division's reconnaissance unit. In July 1942, the group fought in the First Battle of El Alamein and, in October and November 1942, in the Second Battle of El Alamein, during which the 133rd Armored Division "Littorio" and III Tank Group "Lancieri di Novara" were destroyed.

In early 1943, the V Machine Gunners Group "Lancieri di Novara" was sent to North Africa, where it fought in the Tunisian campaign. The group was overwhelmed by enemy forces in the Battle of the Mareth Line and was forced to retreat on 27 March 1943 with heavy losses. On 7 April, the remnants of the group were assigned to the 131st Armored Division "Centauro" and occupied positions at Abd El Rahnane. On 8 April, the group, together with the III Armored Group "Cavalleggeri di Monferrato", reached Takrouna, to the West of Enfidaville. On 20 and 21 April, the group was hit by Anglo-American armored forces near Gebel Gargi. The group resisted valiantly and only thirty lancers escaped. On 22 April 1943, the remnants of the group were assigned to the Grouping "Lequio" and participated in the operations in Cape Bon until they surrendered on 11 May 1943.

=== Cold War ===
On 10 September 1946, the Italian Army decided to form five divisional reconnaissance groups, among them the 5th Lancers Reconnaissance Group (Italian: Gruppo Esplorante 5° Lancieri), which received the traditions and white gorget patches of the Regiment "Lancieri di Novara" (5th). On 1 December 1946, the group became operational in Coverciano in Florence. The following year the group moved from Florence to Codroipo in Friuli-Venezia Giulia, where it joined the Infantry Division "Folgore". On 1 February 1949, the group was expanded to 5th Armored Cavalry Regiment "Lancieri di Novara". The regiment, which upon its formation received the standard of Regiment "Lancieri di Novara" (5th), consisted of a command, a command squadron, and two squadrons groups with M26 Pershing tanks. In September 1951, the regiment formed a third squadrons group. On 1 April 1957, the regiment was assigned, together with the 2nd Armored Cavalry Regiment "Piemonte Cavalleria", 4th Armored Cavalry Regiment "Genova Cavalleria" and 8th Self-propelled Field Artillery Regiment, to the newly formed Cavalry Brigade. On 4 November 1958, the 5th Armored Cavalry Regiment "Lancieri di Novara" was renamed Regiment "Lancieri di Novara" (5th), while on 1 January 1959, the Cavalry Brigade was renamed Cavalry Brigade "Pozzuolo del Friuli".

On 1 March 1964, the regiment transferred one of its squadrons group to the 32nd Tank Regiment, where the squadrons group was renamed V Tank Battalion. On 30 September of the same year, the regiment was reduced to Squadrons Group "Lancieri di Novara" and became the reconnaissance unit of the Cavalry Brigade "Pozzuolo del Friuli". On 20 May 1965, the squadrons group was temporarily entrusted with the standard of the Regiment "Lancieri di Novara" (5th).

During the 1975 army reform the army disbanded the regimental level and newly independent battalions were granted for the first time their own flags, respectively in the case of cavalry units, their own standard. On 1 November 1975, the Squadrons Group "Lancieri di Novara" was reorganized and renamed 5th Tank Squadrons Group "Lancieri di Novara". The squadrons group was assigned to the Armored Brigade "Pozzuolo del Friuli" and consisted of a command, a command and services squadron, and three tank squadrons equipped with Leopard 1A2 main battle tanks. At the time the squadrons group fielded 434 men (32 officers, 82 non-commissioned officers, and 320 soldiers).

On 12 November 1976, the President of the Italian Republic Giovanni Leone assigned with decree 846 the standard and traditions of the Regiment "Lancieri di Novara" (5th) to the squadrons group.

For its conduct and work after the 1976 Friuli earthquake the squadrons group was awarded a Bronze Medal of Army Valor, which was affixed to the squadrons group's standard and added to its coat of arms.

=== Recent times ===
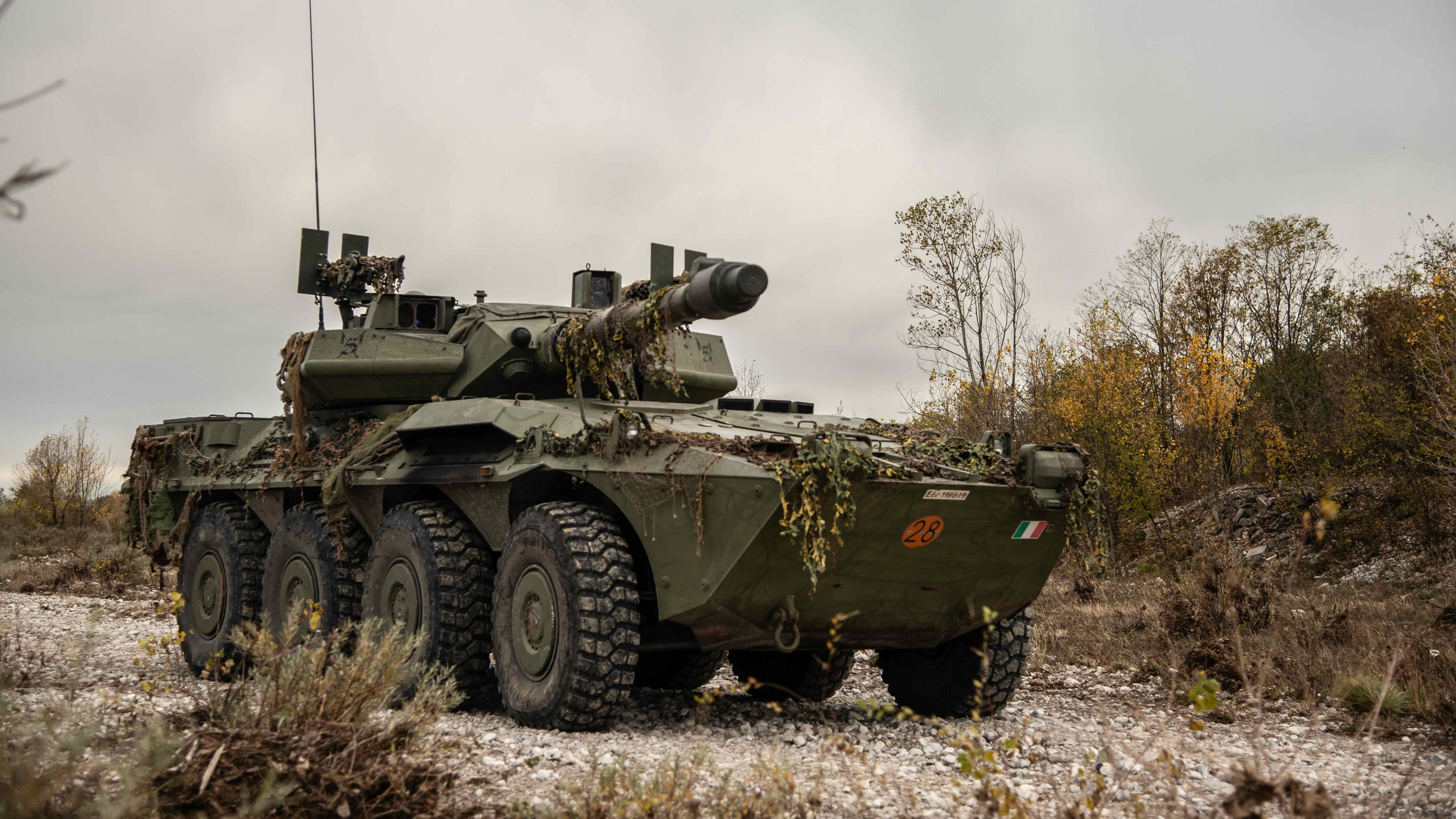
Regiment "Lancieri di Novara" (5th) Centauro during a training exercise

On 4 September 1992, the 5th Tank Squadrons Group "Lancieri di Novara" lost its autonomy and the next day the squadrons group entered the reformed Regiment "Lancieri di Novara" (5th). On the same day, the standard and traditions of the Regiment "Lancieri di Novara" (5th) were transferred from the squadrons group to the regiment. The regiment consisted of a command, a command and services squadron, and a squadrons group with three squadrons with wheeled Centauro tank destroyers.

From 8 January to 31 March 1994, one of the regiment's squadrons was deployed to Somalia as part of the United Nations Operation in Somalia II. In January 2013, the regiment was transferred from the Cavalry Brigade "Pozzuolo del Friuli" to the 132nd Armored Brigade "Ariete".

== Organization ==
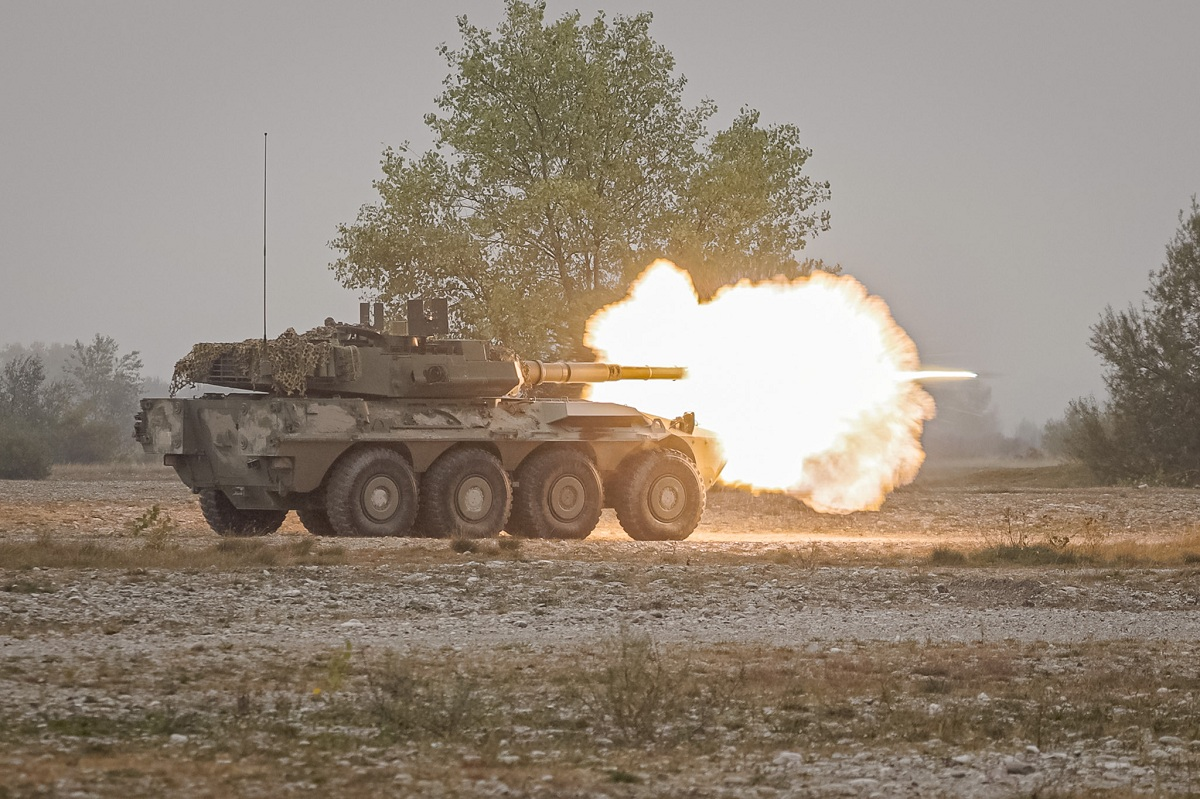
Regiment "Lancieri di Novara" (5th) Centauro tank destroyer during exercise Demetra 2/25

As of 2025 the Regiment "Lancieri di Novara" (5th) is organized as follows:

- Regiment "Lancieri di Novara" (5th), in Codroipo
  - Command and Logistic Support Squadron
  - 1st Reconnaissance Squadrons Group
    - 1st Reconnaissance Squadron
    - 2nd Reconnaissance Squadron
    - 3rd Reconnaissance Squadron
    - Heavy Armored Squadron

The three reconnaissance squadrons are equipped with Lince vehicles and Centauro tank destroyers, which are scheduled to be replaced by Lince 2 vehicles and Freccia EVO Reconnaissance vehicles. The Heavy Armored Squadron is equipped with Centauro tank destroyers, which are being replaced by Centauro 2 tank destroyers.

== See also ==
- 132nd Armored Brigade "Ariete"
