= Kobylenka =

Kobylenka may refer to:

- Kobylenka, Nizhny Novgorod Oblast, a settlement in Nizhny Novgorod Oblast, Russia
- Kobylenka, name of the village of Kotovskoye in Tambov Oblast of the RSFSR until the 1950s
