= Regiment "Cavalleggeri di Piacenza" (18th) =

Inactive Italian Army cavalry unit

- Reggimento "Cavalleggeri di Piacenza" (18°)
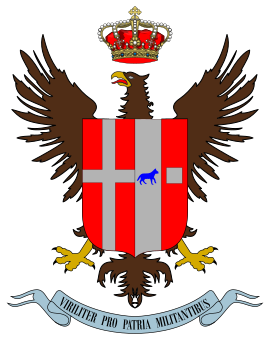
- Regimental coat of arms
- Active: 28 Sept. 1859 — 21 Nov. 1919
- Country: Kingdom of Italy
- Branch: Royal Italian Army
- Garrison/HQ: Caserta
- Motto: "Viriliter pro patria militantibus"
- Anniversaries: 28 September 1859 - Anniversary of the regiment's formation

Insignia
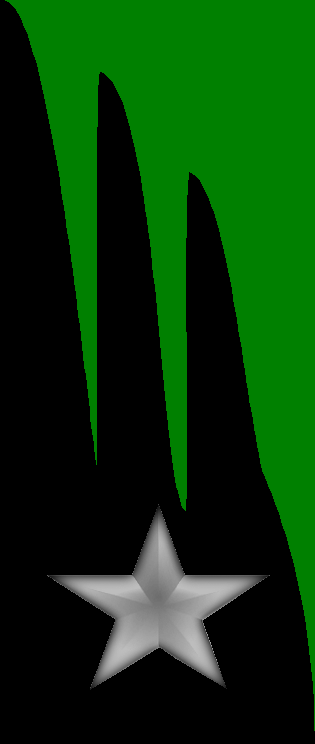
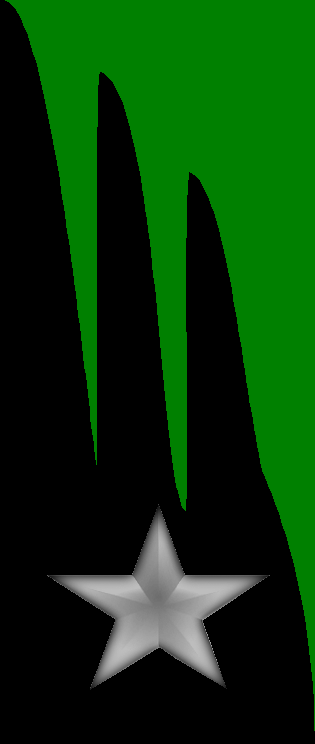
- Regimental gorget patches

The Regiment "Cavalleggeri di Piacenza" (18th) (Italian: Reggimento "Cavalleggeri di Piacenza" (18°) - "Chevau-légers of Piacenza") is an inactive cavalry unit of the Royal Italian Army named for the city of Piacenza in the Emilia-Romagna. In September 1859, shortly after the Second Italian War of Independence, the Regiment "Ussari di Piacenza" ("Hussars of Piacenza") was formed in Parma. The regiment's initial cadre consisted of a core of Hungarian exiles and Emilian volunteers. In 1860, the regiment was incorporated into the Royal Sardinian Army, as the army's only hussar regiment, and was allowed to retain its green and red colored uniform. In 1866, the regiment fought in the Third Italian War of Independence. In World War I the regiment fought on the Italian front. After the war the regiment was disbanded and its traditions assigned to the Regiment "Cavalleggeri di Novara". The regiment's anniversary falls on 28 September 1859, the day the regiment was formed. As the regiment is currently designated as a Chevau-léger unit, its enlisted personnel is addressed as "Chevau-léger" (Italian: Cavalleggero).

== History ==
=== Italian Wars of Independence ===
==== Second Italian War of Independence ====
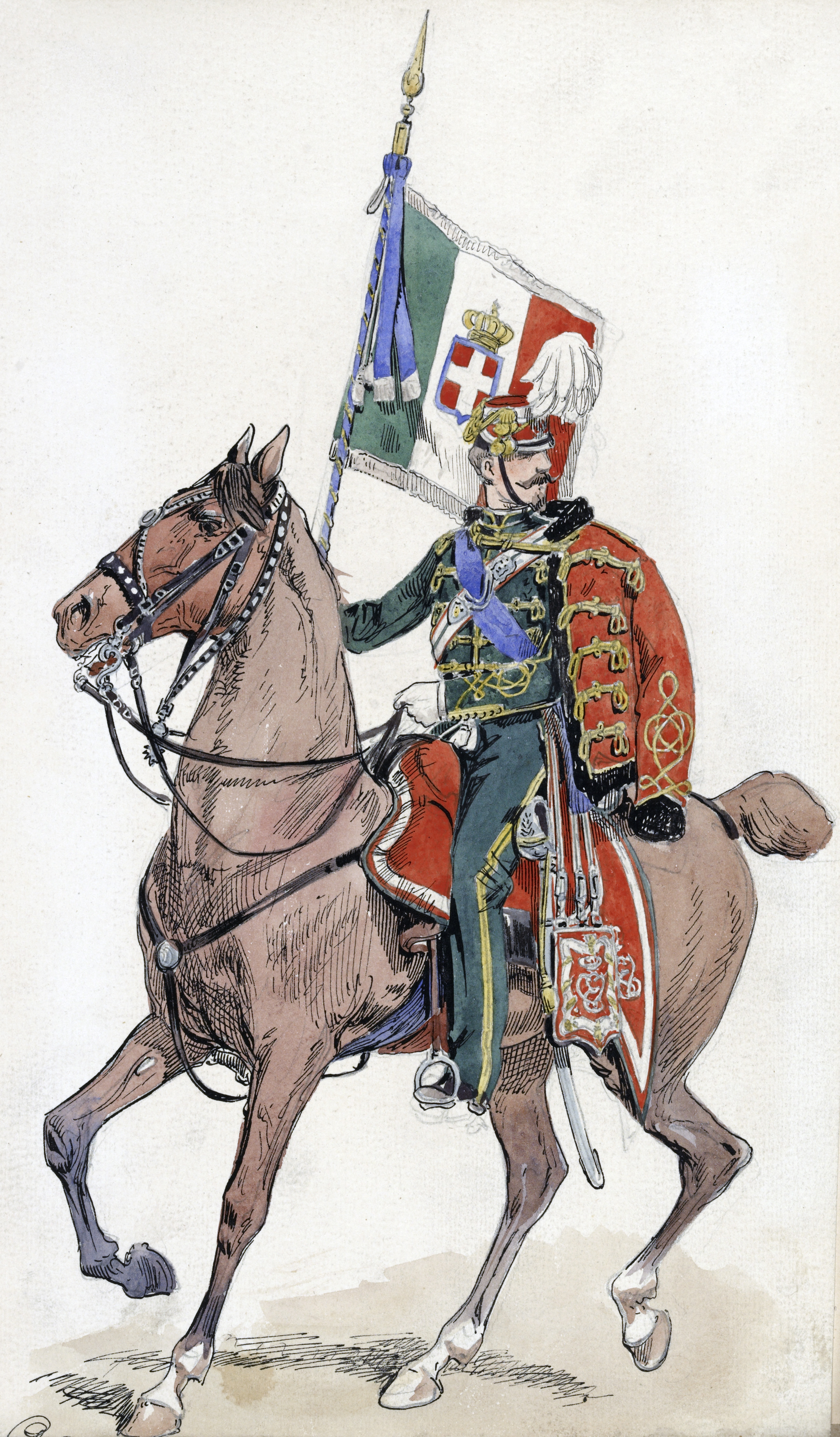
Regiment "Ussari di Piacenza" standard bearer in the regiment's green and red Hussar uniform 1859-63

On 21 July 1858, French Emperor Napoleon III and the Prime Minister of Sardinia Camillo Benso, Count of Cavour met in Plombières and reached a secret verbal agreement on a military alliance between the French Empire and the Kingdom of Sardinia against the Austrian Empire. On 26 January 1859, Napoleon III signed the Franco-Sardinian Treaty, followed by King Victor Emmanuel II on 29 January 1859. On 9 March 1859, Sardinia mobilized its army, followed by Austria on 9 April. On 23 April, Austria delivered an ultimatum to Sardinia demanding its demobilization. Upon Sardinia's refusal, Austria declared war on 26 April and three days later the Austrians crossed the Ticino river into Piedmont. Consequently, France honored its alliance with Sardinia and declared war on Austria on 3 May 1859.

After the outbreak of the war, Princess Louise d'Artois, who ruled the Duchy of Parma and Piacenza as regent in the name of her young son Duke Robert I, fled Parma with her family and took refuge in the Austrian fortress at Mantua. A first revolutionary government in Parma was opposed by the dukedom's military and therefore Princess Louise returned for a short time, but after Austria lost the Battle of Magenta on 4 June 1859, Princess Louise left Parma again on 9 June. Shortly thereafter, the Sardinian Hunters of the Magra Corps occupied Parma. On 12 July 1859, the Second Italian War of Independence ended with the Armistice of Villafranca, which called for the rulers of the Grand Duchy of Tuscany, the Duchy of Modena and Reggio, and the Duchy of Parma and Piacenza, which all had fled their nations, to be restored to their thrones. However neither Sardinia nor the Sardinian installed governments in the three nations wished for a return of the rulers.

After the Armistice of Villafranca, around 20 Hungarian exiles, who had fought in the war on the Italian side, occupied the Palazzo della Pilotta in the center of Parma. The Hungarians were led by Count Gergely Bethlen, who had commanded the Hungarian 15th Hussar Regiment "King Matthias" during the 1848-49 Hungarian uprising. The Hungarians began to train the Emilian volunteers, which had gathered in Parma and, on 28 September 1859, the Regiment "Ussari di Piacenza" was officially formed with Count Gergely Bethlen becoming the regiment's first commanding officer with the rank of Colonel. Count Gergely Bethlen insisted that the regiment adopted the Hungarian Hussar uniform in the colors of Hungary and Italy: green pants and dolman with golden epaulettes and bands, red csákós with white bands, red sabretaches embroidered in white with the King's monogram, and a red pelisse over-jacket with white lining, green braids, respectively mixed gold and silver braids for officers and a black fur border. The regiment's troops also received red shabracks for their horses.

On 30 November 1859, the Duchy of Parma and Piacenza, Duchy of Modena and Reggio, and the Papal Legations of the Romagne were united under the Royal Government of Emilia, which on 1 January 1860 was redesignated as the Royal Provinces of Emilia. On 11 and 12 March 1860, the Royal Provinces of Emilia voted in a plebiscite for annexation by the Kingdom of Sardinia. On 18 March 1860, the annexation act was presented to Victor Emmanuel II, one week later, on 25 March 1860, the Regiment "Ussari di Piacenza" was incorporated into the Royal Sardinian Army. On 6 June 1860, the regiment moved to Savigliano in Piedmont. As one of the Royal Sardinian Army's light cavalry regiments, the regiment's troops were armed with musket, pistol, and sabre, and continued to wear the uniform selected by Count Gergely Bethlen. This made the regiment, together with the Guides Regiment, one of only two cavalry regiments not to wear the Sardinian cavalry's dark blue uniform. On 6 June 1860, the Sardinian War Ministry ordered that the army's light cavalry regiments would be equipped henceforth only with sabre and pistol.

In 1862, the Count Gergely Bethlen retired. In 1863, the regiment's red pelisse over-jacket was replaced by a simpler green pelisse with black silk cords. The same year, the regiment operated in the area of Calitri, Orsara di Puglia and Andretta in southern Italy to suppress the anti-Sardinian revolt, which had erupted after the Kingdom of Sardinia had annexed the Kingdom of the Two Sicilies. In March 1864, the regiment operated in the area of Ripacandida against local rebels.

==== Third Italian War of Independence ====
In 1866, during the Third Italian War of Independence, the regiment formed, together with the Regiment "Lancieri di Novara", the Cavalry Brigade of the II Corps of the Army of the Mincio, which operated along the Mincio river. On 24 June 1866, the II Corps remained in reserve during the Battle of Custoza. After the battle the regiment was sent to cover the retreat of the forces of the Italian I Corps and III Corps.

On 10 September 1871, the regiment was renamed 18th Cavalry Regiment (Piacenza) and ordered dispose of the regiment's Hussar uniform. On 1 January 1872, the regiment ceded one of its squadrons to help form the 20th Cavalry Regiment (Roma), and on 1 April of the same year, the regiment's members began to wear the standard uniform of the Royal Italian Army's cavalry. On 5 November 1876, the regiment was renamed Cavalry Regiment "Piacenza" (18th). On 1 October 1883, the regiment ceded its 6th Squadron to help form the Cavalry Regiment "Catania" (22nd). In 1887, the regiment provided personnel and horses for the formation of the Mounted Hunters Squadron, which fought in the Italo-Ethiopian War of 1887–1889. On 1 November of the same year, the regiment ceded one of its squadrons to help form the Cavalry Regiment "Umberto I" (23rd). In 1895–96, the regiment provided two officers and 68 enlisted for units deployed to Italian Eritrea for the First Italo-Ethiopian War. On 16 December 1897, the regiment was renamed Regiment "Cavalleggeri di Piacenza" (18th). On 1 October 1909, the regiment ceded its 3rd Squadron to help form the Regiment "Cavalleggeri di Aquila" (27th).

=== Italo-Turkish War ===
In November 1911, the regiment's 3rd Squadron and 4th Squadron were deployed to Benghazi in Libya for the Italo-Turkish War. In January 1912, the two squadrons were joined in Benghazi by the regimental command, and the 2nd and 3rd squadrons of the Regiment "Cavalleggeri di Lucca" (16th). Together the four squadrons operated in the Cyrenaica against Ottoman Army forces and local rebels. On 1 May 1912, the squadrons fought in the Battle of Due Palme and later in the same year in the Battle of Al Qawarishah. In May 1912, a detachment drawn from the men of the two squadrons of the regiment participated in the occupation of Rhodes. The two squadrons remained in annexed Libya until 1914.

=== World War I ===
At the outbreak of World War I the regiment consisted of a command, a depot, and two cavalry groups, with the I Group consisting of three squadrons and the II Group consisting of two squadrons and a machine gun section. As the regiment's 3rd Squadron was deployed to Libya, where the squadron remained for the duration of the war, the regiment formed the 6th Squadron as replacement. On 24 May 1915, the day Italy entered the war, the regiment was assigned to the X Army Corps. Unlike the cavalry regiments, which were assigned to the army's 1st and 4th cavalry divisions, the Regiment "Cavalleggeri di Piacenza" (18th) was not dismounted for the war. In April 1916, the regiment's 2nd Squadron was dismounted and attached to the Regiment "Cavalleggeri di Monferrato" (13th), with which the squadron served in the trenches of the Italian front along the Isonzo river. In August 1916, one of the regiment's squadrons was assigned to a provisional cavalry brigade, which fought in the Sixth Battle of the Isonzo and was the first Italian unit to enter the conquered city of Gorizia. In 1917, the regiment's depot in Caserta formed the 1501st Dismounted Machine Gunners Company as reinforcement for the regiment.

In October 1918, the regiment's 5th and 6th squadrons were assigned to the Assault Corps, which was tasked with crossing the Piave river and breaking through the Austro-Hungarian Army's line in the Battle of Vittorio Veneto. On 28 October 1918, the 6th Squadron crossed the river at Ponte della Priula and advanced to Susegana. The next day the squadron formed the Italian vanguard on the road to Santa Maria di Feletto. On 30 October, a patrol of five men of the squadron were sent to reconnoiter the road to Vittorio Veneto. Around 9:00 in the morning, the five soldiers rode into Vittorio Veneto and found most of the city deserted by Austro-Hungarian forces. Later in day the 6th Squadron, together with two squadrons of the Regiment "Lancieri di Firenze" (9th), a Bersaglieri cyclists battalion, a motorcycle machine gunners section, and a mountain artillery section, was ordered to move over the Cansiglio plateau to Farra d'Alpago, where the Italian units would block the Austro-Hungarian retreat from Vittorio Veneto to Ponte nelle Alpi. When the Italian units arrived at Farra d'Alpago they found the road full of discarded Austro-Hungarian equipment and weapons, but with the enemy personnel already gone.

=== Interwar years ===
After the war the Royal Italian Army disbanded the second groups of all thirty cavalry regiments, while the first groups were reduced to two squadrons. On 21 November 1919, 14 cavalry regiments were disbanded and their groups transferred to 14 of the remaining cavalry regiments. One of the disbanded regiments was the Regiment "Cavalleggeri di Piacenza" (18th), whose remaining group was renamed II Squadrons Group "Cavalleggeri di Piacenza". Afterwards, the squadrons group, which remained based in Caserta and retained the disbanded regiment's standard, was assigned to the Regiment "Lancieri di Novara" (5th) in Treviso.

On 20 May 1920, the Royal Italian Army disbanded five additional cavalry regiments, among them the Regiment "Lancieri di Milano" (7th), whose 3rd Squadron of the II Squadrons Group "Cavalleggeri di Roma" was transferred to the Regiment "Lancieri di Novara" (5th). On 1 July 1920, the II Squadrons Group "Cavalleggeri di Piacenza" and one its squadrons were disbanded, while the other squadron moved from Caserta to Treviso. On the same day, the traditions and standard of the Regiment "Cavalleggeri di Piacenza" (18th) were entrusted to the Regiment "Lancieri di Novara" (5th), which was renamed Regiment "Cavalleggeri di Novara". On 24 May 1925, the standard of the Regiment "Cavalleggeri di Piacenza" (18th) was transferred to the Shrine of the Flags, which at the time was located in Castel Sant'Angelo, for safekeeping.
