= Regiment "Cavalleggeri di Monferrato" (13th) =

Inactive Italian Army cavalry unit

- Reggimento "Cavalleggeri di Monferrato" (13°)
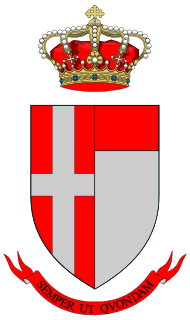
- Regimental coat of arms
- Active: 3 Jan. 1850 — 14 Nov. 1943
- Country: Kingdom of Italy
- Branch: Royal Italian Army
- Motto(s): "Semper ut quondam"
- Anniversaries: 20 May 1859 - Battle of Montebello
- Decorations: 1× Bronze Medal of Military Valor

Insignia
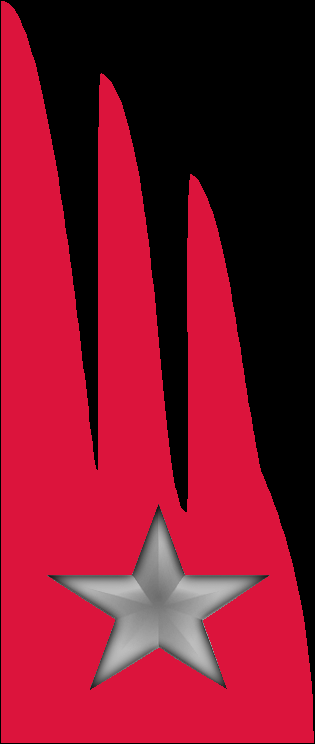
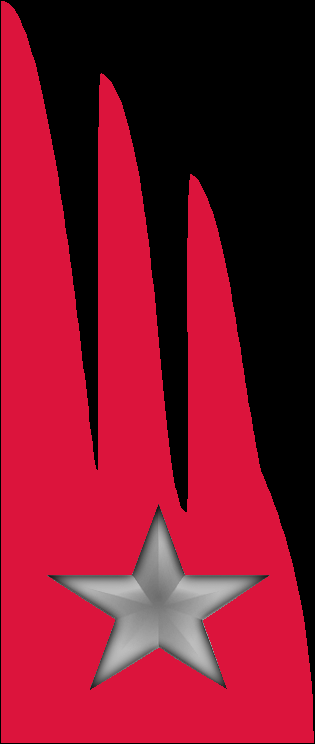
- Regimental gorget patches

The Regiment "Cavalleggeri di Monferrato" (13th) (Italian: Reggimento "Cavalleggeri di Monferrato" (13°) - "Chevau-légers of Monferrato") is an inactive cavalry unit of the Italian Army named for the Duchy of Montferrat. In 1850, the Royal Sardinian Army formed the Regiment "Cavalleggeri di Monferrato" with troops raised between the two campaigns of the First Italian War of Independence. The regiment fought in the Crimean War, Second Italian War of Independence, and Third Italian War of Independence. In World War I the regiment fought on the Italian front. During World War II the regiment participated in the invasion of France. Afterwards the regiment was sent to Albania, where the regiment refused to surrender to invading German forces after the announcement of the Armistice of Cassibile on 8 September 1943. The regiment battled German forces until 14 November 1943, when its remnants were forced to surrender. The regiment's anniversary falls on 20 May 1859, the day of the Battle of Montebello, during which the regiment repeatedly charged Austrian infantry squares and cavalry, for which the regiment was awarded a Bronze Medal of Military Valor. As the regiment is a Chevau-léger unit, its enlisted personnel is addressed as "Chevau-léger" (Italian: Cavalleggero).

== History ==
=== Italian Wars of Independence ===
==== First Italian War of Independence ====
On 12 September 1848, between the two campaigns of the First Italian War of Independence, three squadrons of mounted guides were formed in Stupinigi. On 3 January 1850, these three squadrons entered the newly formed Regiment "Cavalleggeri di Monferrato" in Pinerolo. The regiment's 4th Squadron was formed with personnel drawn from the 6th Squadron of the Regiment "Savoia Cavalleria" and horses drawn from the 5th and 6th squadrons of the Regiment "Cavalleggeri di Saluzzo". The regiment's depot squadron was formed with personnel drawn from the 6th Squadron of the Regiment "Genova Cavalleria". As one of the Royal Sardinian Army's light cavalry regiments, the regiment's troops wore a crimson kepi and were armed with musket, pistol, and sabre. After its formation the regiment participated in the second campaign of the First Italian Wars of Independence.

On 31 March 1855, the regiment's 1st Squadron was assigned to the Provisional Cavalry Regiment for the Sardinian expeditionary corps, which deployed to Crimea for the Crimean War. On 16 August 1855, the Provisional Cavalry Regiment fought in the Battle of the Chernaya. After the Crimean War the regiment was repatriated and, on 18 June 1856, disbanded and its squadrons returned to their original regiments.

==== Second Italian War of Independence ====
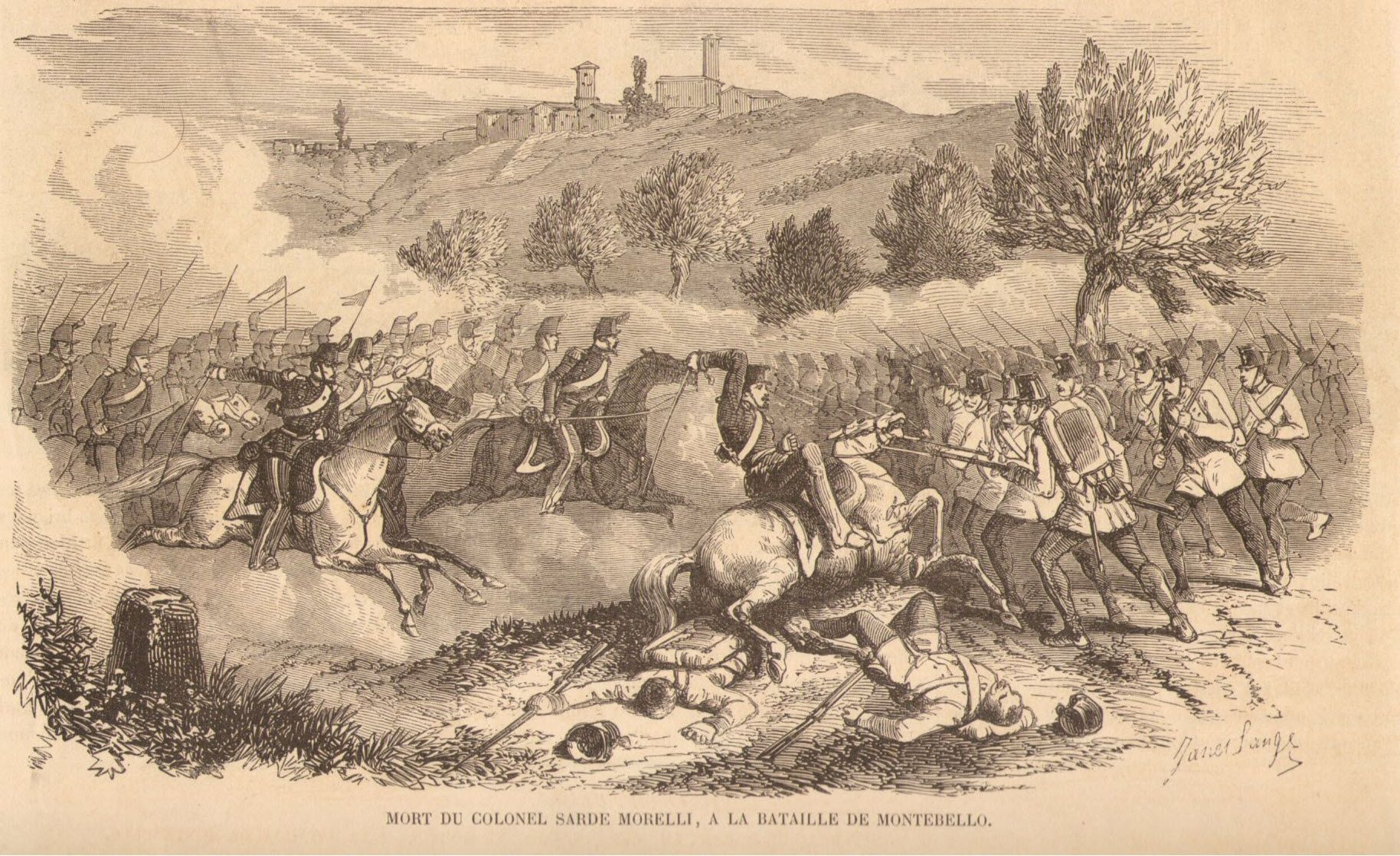
The death of Lieutenant Colonel Tomaso Morelli di Popolo during one of the charges of the Regiment "Cavalleggeri di Monferrato" at the Battle of Montebello

On 26 April 1859, the Second Italian War of Independence began. On 20 May, the Imperial Austrian Army's V Corps under Feldmarschall-leutnant Philipp von Stadion und Thannhausen advanced in three columns towards Voghera, where the French 1st Division under General Élie Frédéric Forey and a Sardinian cavalry brigade under Colonel Maurizio Gerbaix de Sonnaz were based. The Sardinian cavalry brigade consisted of three squadrons of the Regiment "Cavalleggeri di Novara", four squadrons of the Regiment "Cavalleggeri di Aosta", and the 3rd and 4th squadrons of the Regiment "Cavalleggeri di Monferrato". As soon as General Forey was informed of the Austrian advance, he ordered his division to march towards the enemy, which led to the Battle of Montebello. Around 14:00, the French 84th Infantry Regiment blocked the Austrian's left column at Genestrello to the West of Montebello, while the regiments "Cavalleggeri di Novara" and "Cavalleggeri di Monferrato" charged the Austrian column, which was forced to form squares. At the same time two French infantry battalions and the Regiment "Cavalleggeri di Aosta" stopped the advance of the Austrian right column at Casatisma. By 15:00, General Forey ordered one of his brigades to commence a frontal attack on the Austrian position in Montebello, while the division's second brigade would begin a maneuver to envelop the Austrians from the South. Between 16:00 and 17:00, General Forey dismounted and personally led his men up the hill to Montebello, while the Sardinian cavalry regiments continued to charge the Austrians. During one of the charges, the commanding officer of the Regiment "Cavalleggeri di Monferrato", Lieutenant Colonel Tomaso Morelli di Popolo was mortally wounded. By 18:30, the village of Montebello was cleared of Austrian forces and Feldmarschall-leutnant von Stadion ordered his corps to fall back.

On 24 June 1859, the Regiment "Cavalleggeri di Monferrato" fought in the Battle of San Martino, during which the regiment's 2nd Squadron charged the hill of San Martino and forced the Austrian troops to abandon it. For its conduct in the Battle of Montebello and in the Battle of San Martino the Regiment "Cavalleggeri di Monferrato" was awarded a Bronze Medal of Military Valor, which was affixed to the regiment's standard.

On 16 September 1859, the Royal Sardinian Army's nine cavalry regiments ceded one squadron each to help form three new Chevau-légers regiments and the three squadrons ceded by the cavalry regiments "Cavalleggeri di Novara", "Cavalleggeri di Aosta" and "Cavalleggeri di Monferrato", which had distinguished themselves in the Battle of Montebello four months earlier, were used to form the Regiment "Cavalleggeri di Montebello" — the only Italian cavalry regiment named for a battle. On 6 June 1860, the Sardinian War Ministry ordered that the army's light cavalry regiments would be equipped henceforth with sabre and pistol.

Between 1863 and 1865, the regiment operated in southern Italy to suppress the anti-Sardinian revolt, which had erupted after the Kingdom of Sardinia had annexed the Kingdom of the Two Sicilies. On 16 July 1863, the regiment's troops clashed with rebels at San Giorgio La Molara and the next day, on 17 July, at San Marco dei Cavoti. On 27 June 1864, the regiment fought rebels at Ripacandida. On 16 February of the same year, the regiment ceded its 4th Squadron to help form the Regiment "Cavalleggeri di Caserta".

==== Third Italian War of Independence ====
On 20 June 1866, the Third Italian War of Independence between the Kingdom of Italy and the Austrian Empire began. During the war the Regiment "Cavalleggeri di Monferrato" formed, together with the Regiment "Lancieri di Firenze" and Regiment "Lancieri Vittorio Emanuele", the II Cavalry Brigade of the IV Corps of the Army of the Po, which operated along the Po river. On 5 July 1866, the Army of the Po began the siege of the Austrian fortress at Borgoforte and during the night between 6 and 7 July the army crossed the Po river. On 11 July, the first forces of the Army of the Po entered Rovigo, which had been abandoned by the Austrians, as the Austrian forces in Italy had received the order to retreat towards the Isonzo river and the Trentino region. On 14 July, the Italian IV Corps ceded five divisions and the Italian I Corps one division to form the V Corps and VI Corps. Additionally the Italian II Corps and III Corps ceded both one division to form the VIII Corps. Afterwards the Army of the Po, which now consisted of the I, IV, V, VI, and VIII corps with a combined force of 14 divisions and six cavalry brigades, began a rapid advance through Veneto towards the Isonzo river without encountering Austrian forces.

On 10 September 1871, the regiment was renamed 13th Cavalry Regiment (Monferrato). On 1 January 1872, the regiment ceded one of its squadrons to help form the 20th Cavalry Regiment (Roma). On 5 November 1876, the regiment was renamed Cavalry Regiment "Monferrato" (13th). On 1 October 1883, the regiment ceded its 6th Squadron to help form the Cavalry Regiment "Padova" (21st). In 1887, the regiment provided personnel and horses for the formation of the Mounted Hunters Squadron, which fought in the Italo-Ethiopian War of 1887–1889. On 1 November of the same year, the regiment ceded one of its squadrons to help form the Cavalry Regiment "Umberto I" (23rd). In 1895-96, the regiment provided one officer and 58 enlisted for units deployed to Italian Eritrea for the First Italo-Ethiopian War. On 16 December 1897, the regiment was renamed Regiment "Cavalleggeri di Monferrato" (13th). On 1 October 1909, the regiment ceded its 3rd Squadron to help form the Regiment "Cavalleggeri di Aquila" (27th). In 1911–12, the regiment provided one officer and 80 enlisted to units deployed for the Italo-Turkish War.

=== World War I ===
At the outbreak of World War I the regiment consisted of a command, a depot, and two cavalry groups, with the I Group consisting of three squadrons and the II Group consisting of two squadrons and a machine gun section. Together with the Regiment "Cavalleggeri di Roma" (20th) the regiment formed the I Cavalry Brigade, which was assigned to the 1st Cavalry Division "Friuli". In April 1916, the division was dismounted for service in the trenches of the Italian front. After being dismounted the regiment was reinforced by the dismounted 2nd Squadron of the Regiment "Cavalleggeri di Piacenza" (18th). On 11 May 1916, the 1st Cavalry Division "Friuli" entered the trenches at Plave in the center of the Isonzo front. In late July 1916, the 1st Cavalry Division "Friuli" and 4th Cavalry Division "Piemonte" switched places on the front, with the 1st Cavalry Division "Friuli" entering the trenches at Monfalcone below the Karst plateau, while the 4th Cavalry Division "Piemonte" entered the trenches at Plave. From 4 to 12 August 1916, the 1st Cavalry Division "Friuli" fought in the Sixth Battle of the Isonzo at Monfalcone, during which the Regiment "Cavalleggeri di Monferrato" (13th) attacked towards Height 85 and Height 121. On 10 October 1918, the regiment was attached to the Brigade "Arezzo", which was tasked to take Height 77 above Monfalcone during the Eighth Battle of the Isonzo. On 10 October, the regiment and brigade attacked Height 77 three times, but all attacks failed and the Italian units returned to their starting positions. On 3 December 1916, the regiment was sent to the rear for some rest.

In April 1917, the regiment was mounted again and the 2nd Squadron of the Regiment "Cavalleggeri di Piacenza" (18th) returned to its own regiment. During the same year, the regiment's depot in Udine formed the 740th Dismounted Machine Gunners Company as reinforcement for the regiment. On 24 October 1917, the Imperial German Army and Austro-Hungarian Army began the Battle of Caporetto and already on the first day of the battle the German 14th Army broke through the Italian lines at Kobarid. All mounted Italian cavalry regiments were sent forward to cover the retreat of the Italian 2nd Army and 3rd Army from the Isonzo front. On 29 October 1917, the I Cavalry Brigade, which consisted of the Regiment "Cavalleggeri di Monferrato" (13th) and Regiment "Cavalleggeri di Roma" (20th), arrived in Palmanova. At Palmanova the 1st Squadron of the Regiment "Cavalleggeri di Monferrato" (13th) was detached and sent to defend the bridges over the Cormor river at Mortegliano. The rest of the brigade was ordered to move North to Basiliano. On the way, the vanguard of the Regiment "Cavalleggeri di Monferrato" (13th) encountered enemy patrols at Pozzuolo, which two platoons of the regiment's 2nd Squadron charged to allow the rest of the brigade to continue on its way. At Basiliano the two cavalry regiments formed a defensive line, which at 15:00 of 29 October the Austro-Hungarians attacked with infantry and artillery. To slow down the enemy advance, the 4th and 5th squadrons of the Regiment "Cavalleggeri di Monferrato" (13th) charged the enemy troops. However one hour after the battle began the two cavalry regiments had to retreat to avoid being encircled by the masses of enemy troops surging forward. Between 2 and 8 November 1917, the Regiment "Cavalleggeri di Monferrato" (13th) then covered the Italian retreat to the Piave.

As during the Austro-Hungarian offensive the regiment's base in Udine had been lost the regiment was sent to Cento near Ferrara, where it spent some time to rest. During the first half of 1918, the regiment was stationed in the area of between Forlì and Forlimpopoli. On 25 June 1918, after the conclusion of the Second Battle of the Piave River, the regiment moved to Vicenza to train river crossings. On 24 October 1918, the Royal Italian Army began the Battle of Vittorio Veneto and on 29 October, the regiment crossed the Piave river at Palazzon. The regiment spent the night in Mareno di Piave and the next day, on 30 October, the regiment, like all cavalry regiments, was ordered to pursue the retreating Austro-Hungarian armies. On 3 November 1918, the regiment arrived in Travesio. The next day, on 4 November, the regiment's command and I Group advanced to Tolmezzo, while the regiment's II Group crossed the Tagliamento river and advanced to Osoppo, where the group clashed with Austro-Hungarian rearguards. After arriving in Tolmezzo, the regiment's command and I Group launched an attack towards Carnia, where the regiment encountered two retreating Austro-Hungarian divisions. The Austro-Hungarians troops abandoned their weapons, including 78 cannons, and afterwards were allowed to continue their retreat.

=== Interwar years ===
As the base of the Regiment "Cavalleggeri di Monferrato" (13th) in Udine had been destroyed during the Battle of Caporetto, the regiment moved on 22 December 1918 to Palermo, where the regiment was housed in the barracks of the Regiment "Cavalleggeri di Palermo" (30th), which remained deployed in the Italian protectorate of Albania until February 1920. In 1919, the Royal Italian Army disbanded the second groups of all thirty cavalry regiments, while the first groups were reduced to two squadrons. On 21 November 1919, 14 cavalry regiments were disbanded and their groups transferred to 14 of the remaining cavalry regiments. One of the disbanded regiments was the Regiment "Cavalleggeri Umberto I" (23rd), whose group was renamed II Squadrons Group "Cavalleggeri Umberto I". Afterwards, the squadrons group, which remained based in Santa Maria Capua Vetere and retained the disbanded regiment's standard, was assigned to the Regiment "Cavalleggeri di Monferrato" (13th).

In February 1920, the Regiment "Cavalleggeri di Monferrato" (13th) returned to its own barracks in Udine. On 20 May 1920, the Royal Italian Army disbanded five additional cavalry regiments, among them the Regiment "Cavalleggeri di Lucca" (16th), whose 3rd Squadron of the II Squadrons Group "Cavalleggeri di Padova" was transferred to the Regiment "Cavalleggeri di Monferrato" (13th). On 1 July 1920, the II Squadrons Group "Cavalleggeri Umberto I" and one its squadrons were disbanded. On the same day, the traditions and standard of the Regiment "Cavalleggeri Umberto I" (23rd) were entrusted to the Regiment "Cavalleggeri di Monferrato" (13th), which was renamed Regiment "Cavalleggeri di Monferrato". On 24 May 1925, the standard of the Regiment "Cavalleggeri Umberto I" (23rd) was transferred to the Shrine of the Flags, which at the time was located in Castel Sant'Angelo, for safekeeping.

On 15 June 1930, the regiment was assigned, together with the Regiment "Cavalleggeri di Saluzzo" and Regiment "Cavalleggeri di Alessandria", to the 1st Cavalry Division. In January 1933, the regiment left the 1st Cavalry Division and moved from Udine to Voghera. In 1935-36, the regiment provided one officer and 309 enlisted for the formation of the III and IV truck-mounted machine gunner groups of the Regiment "Cavalleggeri di Aosta" and a further seven officers and 413 enlisted for other units deployed to East Africa for the Second Italo-Ethiopian War.

=== World War II ===
At the outbreak of World War II the regiment consisted of a command, a command squadron, the 5th Machine Gunners Squadron, and the I and II squadrons groups, which both consisted of two mounted squadrons. The regiment fielded 37 officers, 37 non-commissioned officers, 798 enlisted troops and 818 horses. The regiment was equipped with one car, six motorcycles, 16 trucks, 36 Breda mod. 30 light machine guns, and 12 Fiat mod. 35 heavy machine guns. In June 1940, the regiment participated in the invasion of France without seeing combat. Afterwards the regiment was sent to Albania on garrison duty. During the war the regiment's depot in Voghera formed the following units:

- I Road Movement Battalion "Cavalleggeri di Monferrato"
- III Armored Group "Cavalleggeri di Monferrato", with AB 41 armored cars
- IV Tank Group "Cavalleggeri di Monferrato", with L6/40 tanks
- LIX Dismounted Group "Cavalleggeri di Monferrato"

The III Armored Group "Cavalleggeri di Monferrato" was formed on 1 February 1942. The group consisted of a command, a command squadron, and two armored car squadrons, which were equipped with AB 41 armored cars. In July of the same year, the group was sent to Libya, where the group operated as one of the reconnaissance units of the Panzer Army Africa during the Western Desert Campaign. In September 1942, the group participated in the occupation of the Jalu Oasis in the Libyan desert, and then in the occupation of the Siwa Oasis in Egypt. In October 1942, during the Second Battle of El Alamein, the group was located at Ajdabiya and then fought in the Axis retreat to Tunisia. In January 1943, the III Armored Group captured David Stirling, the founder and commander of the British Special Air Service, near El Hamma in Tunisia. At the end of January 1943, the group's 2nd Squadron was used to form the II Armored Reconnaissance Group "Cavalleggeri di Monferrato", which consisted of a command, a armored cars squadron with 14 AB 41 armored cars, a battery with four 65/17 mod. 13 mountain guns mounted on captured British Morris CS8 trucks, and an Auto-Saharan Company. In total the group fielded 20 officers, 25 non-commissioned officers, and 213 enlisted men. The II Armored Reconnaissance Group "Cavalleggeri di Monferrato" and III Armored Group "Cavalleggeri di Monferrato" operated as reconnaissance units in the Tunisian Campaign. On 21 April 1943, the remnants of the III Armored Group "Cavalleggeri di Monferrato", and the remnants of all other autonomous cavalry groups located in Tunisia, were incorporated by the Armored Reconnaissance Grouping "Cavalleggeri di Lodi". On 13 May 1943, the Axis forces in Tunisia surrendered to the Anglo-American Allies.

In May 1943, the regiment's depot formed the IV Armored Group "Cavalleggeri di Monferrato", which was equipped with 30 L6/40 tanks. The group was sent to Albania to reinforce the Regiment "Cavalleggeri di Monferrato", which was located in Berat. In the evening of 8 September 1943, the Armistice of Cassibile, which ended hostilities between the Kingdom of Italy and the Anglo-American Allies, was announced by General Dwight D. Eisenhower on Radio Algiers and by Marshal Pietro Badoglio on Italian radio. Germany reacted by invading Italy and demanding that all Italian units in Albania surrender. The Regiment "Cavalleggeri di Monferrato" refused the German demands and fought the German forces advancing on Berat. On 21 September 1943, the regiment abandoned Berat and moved into the Albanian mountains, where it allied with Albanian partisans. On 14 November 1943, the remnants of the regiment were overcome by the German forces and the next day the Germans executed the regiment's commanding officer Colonel Luigi Lanzuolo.
