= Kotovsky, Uryupinsky District, Volgograd Oblast =

Kotovsky Котовский
- Khutor
- Location within Volgograd Oblast Location within Russia
- Coordinates: 50°50′N 41°56′E
- Country: Russia
- Region: Volgograd Oblast
- District: Uryupinsky District
- Time zone: UTC+4:00

Kotovsky (Russian: Котовский) is a rural locality (a khutor) and the administrative center of Kotovskoye Rural Settlement, Uryupinsky District, Volgograd Oblast, Russia. The population was 953 as of 2010. There are 19 streets.

== Geography ==
Kotovsky is located in steppe, 15 km northwest of Uryupinsk (the district's administrative centre) by road. Popov is the nearest rural locality.
