= Kotovskoye =

Rural locality in Rasskazovsky District, Tambov Oblast, Russia

Coordinates: 52°32′N 41°47′E

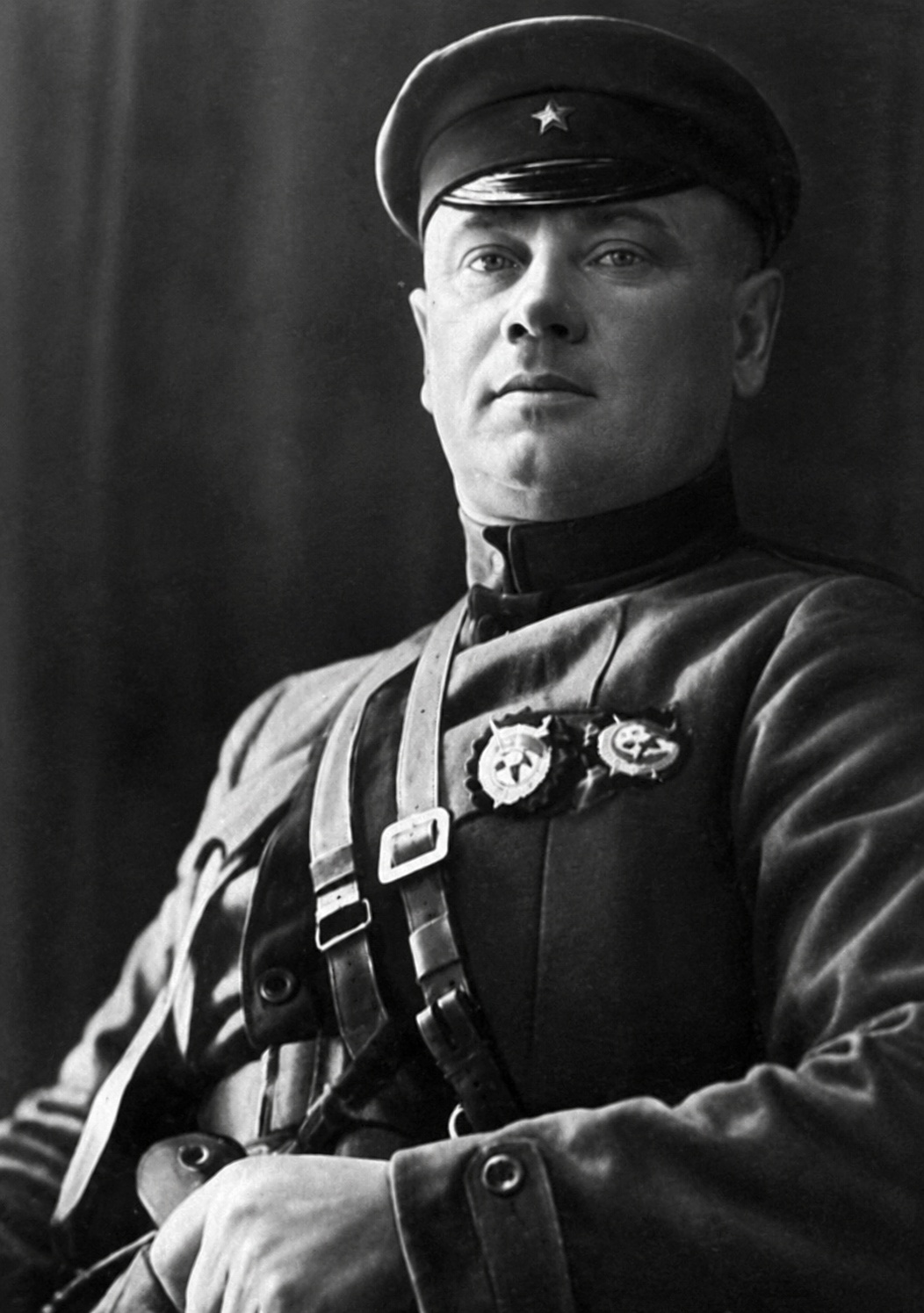
Grigory Kotovsky, after whom the village is named

Kotovskoye (Russian: Котовское) is a rural locality (selo) in the Rasskazovsky District of Tambov Oblast, Russia.

== Name ==
Before the name was changed to Kotovskoye, it was named the Russian Ganchesty.

In the 1950s, the village was given its present name in honor of Grigory Kotovsky, a prominent Soviet military leader and communist activist.

== History ==
The village was founded in 1744 as Kobylenka (Кобыленка). According to the Second Audit of 1744, the village was settled by the migrants from nearby Koptevo and Zderevaya. According to the Audit, the village population was 152.

Kotovskoye developed when multiple Jews immigrated to Bessarabia (see History of the Jews in Bessarabia).

== Demographics ==
=== Jew population ===
In 1925, 203 Jews were merchants, 94 were artisans, and 21 were farmers.

During the Holocaust, the Jew population was killed when Nazi German forces went through the area.

==== Population by year ====
Amount of Jews living in Kotovskoye by year
1847	1897	1930
2,228	372	1,521

== Sources ==
Тамбовская областная Дума. Закон №72-З от 21 июня 1996 г. «Об административно-территориальном устройстве Тамбовской области», в ред. Закона №544-З от 11 июня 2015 г. «О внесении изменений в статью 7 Закона Тамбовской области "Об административно-территориальном устройстве Тамбовской области"». Опубликован: "Тамбовская жизнь", №131, 1996 г. (Tambov Oblast Duma. Law #72-Z of June 21, 1996 On the Administrative-Territorial Structure of Tambov Oblast, as amended by the Law #544-Z of June 11, 2015 On Amending Article 7 of the Law of Tambov Oblast "On the Administrative-Territorial Structure of Tambov Oblast". ).
