= Kotovsky, Serafimovichsky District, Volgograd Oblast =

Kotovsky Котовский
- Khutor
- Location within Volgograd Oblast Location within Russia
- Coordinates: 49°25′N 42°18′E
- Country: Russia
- Region: Volgograd Oblast
- District: Serafimovichsky District
- Time zone: UTC+4:00

Kotovsky (Russian: Котовский) is a rural locality (a khutor) in Bolshovskoye Rural Settlement, Serafimovichsky District, Volgograd Oblast, Russia. The population was 201 as of 2010. There are 6 streets.

== Geography ==
Kotovsky is located on the Tsutskan River, 43 southwest of Serafimovich (the district's administrative centre) by road. Bolshoy is the nearest rural locality.
