= Chevau-léger =

French term for cavalry units

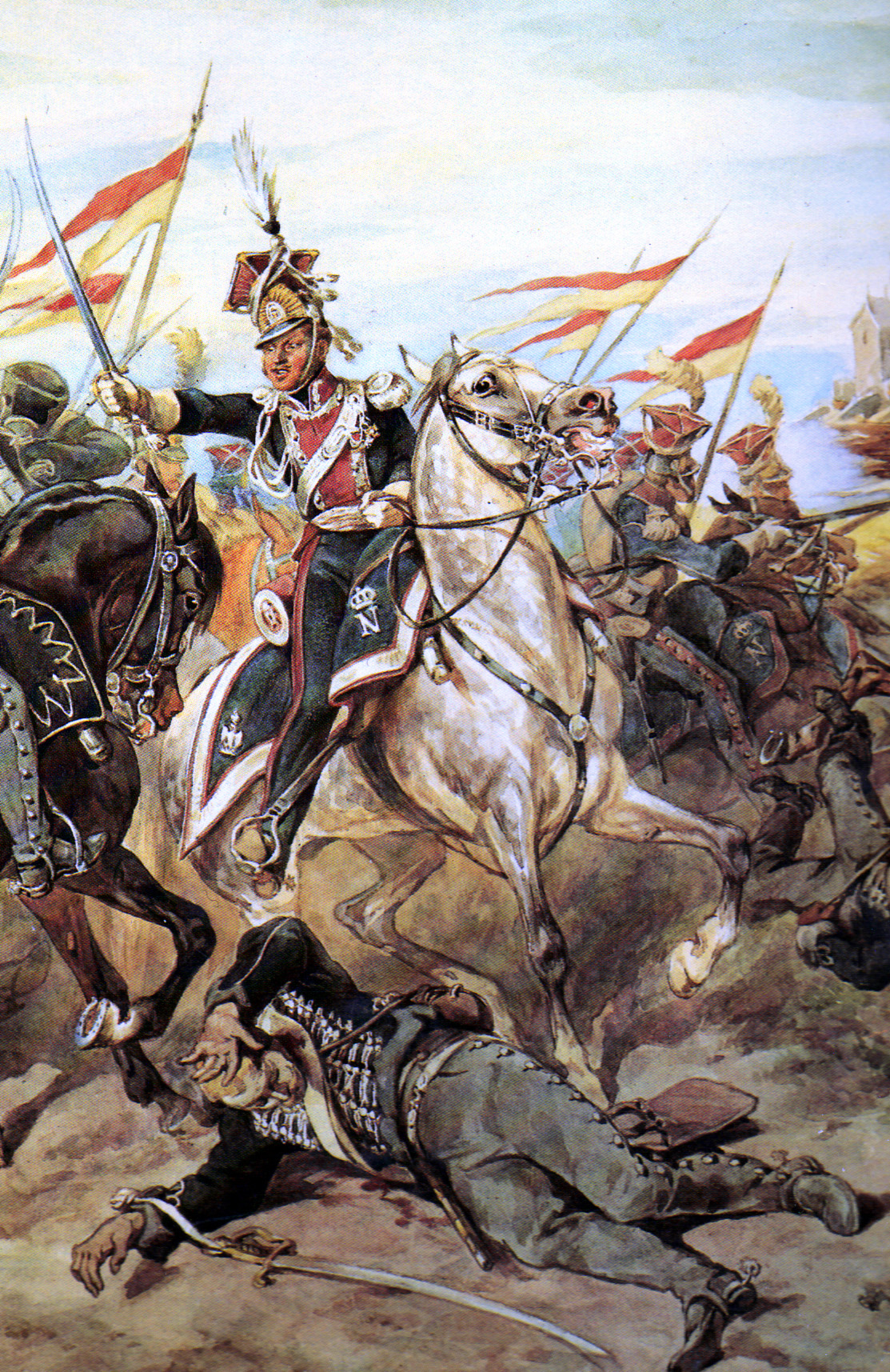
Polish 1st Light Cavalry Regiment of the Imperial Guard during the Battle of Peterswalde.

Chevau-légers (pronounced [ʃəvoleʒe] from French cheval—horse—and léger—light) was a generic French name for light cavalry and medium cavalry.

Their history began in the late 15th and early 16th centuries, when the heavy cavalry forces of the French Compagnies d'Ordonnance were undergoing a massive structural reorganization. Initially, the companies combined the gendarmes (fully armoured men-at-arms) along with lighter coutiliers and "archers" in the same mounted formation, with the better armoured men forming the foremost ranks. However, as time passed the lighter horsemen were increasingly separated into independent formations of medium cavalry, bearing lighter armour and much shorter lances than the gendarmes. These lighter formations eventually gained the name of "chevau légers". A similar development also happened in the organization of the Austrian and Spanish cavalry with the growth of caballería ligera formations.

Their original similarities to lancer units meant that in the armies of the Napoleonic Wars the title came to be applied to both the sword armed medium cavalry and the lance-armed light cavalry units interchangeably, depending on the regional custom. Examples of this include the famous Polish 1st Light Cavalry Regiment of the French Guards and the 2e régiment de chevau-légers lanciers de la Garde Impériale, both subtitled Chevau-légers despite being lance-armed light cavalry, while Austrian and many of the German states retained Chevau-légers that were actually sword-armed medium cavalry.
