= Regiment "Genova Cavalleria" (4th) =

Active Italian Army dragoon unit

- Reggimento "Genova Cavalleria" (4°)
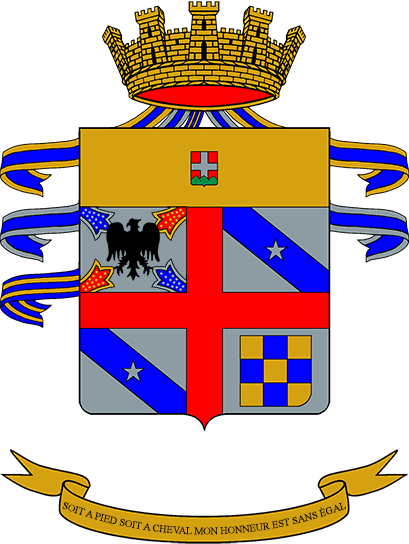
- Regimental coat of arms
- Active: 26 Jan. 1683 – 10 May 1799; 1 Jan. 1815 – 1 Aug. 1821; 1 Aug. 1821 – 10 Sept. 1943; 1 Feb. 1949 – today
- Country: Italy
- Branch: Italian Army
- Part of: Cavalry Brigade "Pozzuolo del Friuli"
- Garrison/HQ: Palmanova
- Motto: "Soit à pied soit à cheval mon honneur est sans ègal"
- Anniversaries: 21 April 1796 – Battle of Mondovì
- Decorations: 2× Gold Medals of Military Valor; 2× Silver Medals of Military Valor; 1× Bronze Medal of Army Valor

Insignia
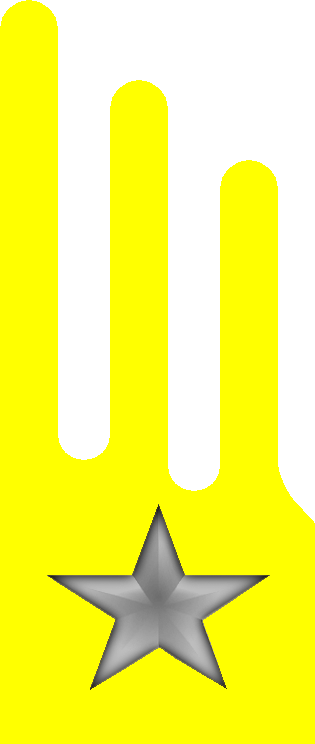
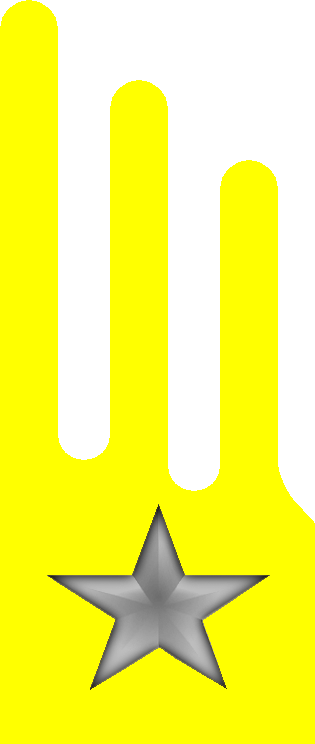
- Regimental gorget patches

The Regiment "Genova Cavalleria" (4th) (Italian: Reggimento "Genova Cavalleria" (4°)) is a cavalry unit of the Italian Army based in Palmanova in Friuli-Venezia Giulia. The regiment is the reconnaissance unit of the Cavalry Brigade "Pozzuolo del Friuli".

The regiment was formed on 1 August 1821, with a detachment of the Regiment "Dragoni del Re", that had remained loyal to King Victor Emmanuel I during a revolt in March of the same year. In 1871, when the Royal Italian Army's cavalry regiments were numbered according to their seniority, the regiment was numbered as if founded in 1821 and thus the fourth oldest by seniority. In February 1897, the Royal Italian Army allowed the regiment to inherit the traditions and honors of the Regiment "Dragoni di Sua Maestà", which was the direct predecessor of the Regiment "Dragoni del Re". Since then the regiment is the oldest Italian Army cavalry regiment and the army's only unit, whose anniversary commemorates an 18th century battle. The regiment is also the Italian cavalry's highest decorated regiment, with two Gold Medals of Military Valor, which were awarded to the regiment for its valor in the Battle of Mondovì. Furthermore, the regiment is the Italian Army's only unit, which was awarded two medals for the same battle, and the first Italian unit, that was awarded a Gold Medal of Military Valor.

In January 1683, Victor Amadeus II ordered to form a dragoon regiment, which was soon given the name Regiment "Dragoni di Sua Altezza Reale" (Regiment "Dragoons of His Royal Highness"). From 1690 to 1696, the regiment fought in the Nine Years' War. Between 1701 and 1713, the regiment fought in the War of the Spanish Succession, durich which Victor Amadeus II personally led the regiment against French forces during the Battle of Turin in 1706. The War of the Spanish Succession resulted with the transfer of the Kingdom of Sicily to the House of Savoy. On 24 December 1713, Victor Amadeus II and his wife, Anne Marie d'Orléans were crowned in the cathedral of Palermo King and Queen of Sicily. Consequently, the Regiment "Dragoni di Sua Altezza Reale" was renamed Regiment "Dragoni di Sua Maestà" (Regiment "Dragoons of His Majesty"). From 1733 to 1735, the regiment fought in the War of the Polish Succession, and from 1741 to 1748, in the War of the Austrian Succession, during which the regiment distinguished itself in the 1746 in the Battle of Rottofreddo. From 1792 to 1796, the regiment fought in the War of the First Coalition against the French Republic. On 21 April 1796, two of the regiment's squadrons charged and dispersed the French 5^{e} Régiment de dragons during the Battle of Mondovì. For this act of valor King Victor Amadeus III awarded the regiment two Gold Medals of Military Valor. In November 1798, during the War of the Second Coalition, French forces occupied Piedmont, forced King Charles Emmanuel IV into exile, and formed the Piedmontese Republic, a French client-state. In spring 1799, the regiment fought on the French side against the Austrians, which disbanded the Piedmontese Republic and its military units after their victorious campaign in Italy.

In May 1814, King Victor Emmanuel I returned from exile in Sardinia and, on 1 December of the same year, the King ordered to reform the regiment as Regiment "Dragoni del Re". In March 1821 most of the regiment's personnel participated, together with the troops of two other cavalry regiments and four infantry brigades, in a revolt against King Victor Emmanuel I, who abdicated in favor of his brother Charles Felix. After the revolt Charles Felix ordered that the three cavalry regiments and four infantry brigades should be disbanded. The personnel of a detachment of the Regiment "Dragoni del Re", which had been based during the revolt in the city of Genoa (Italian: Genova) and dispersed the rebels there, was used to form the Regiment "Dragoni del Génévois". On 3 January 1832, that regiment was renamed Regiment "Genova Cavalleria". In 1848–49, the regiment fought in the First Italian War of Independence and in 1859 in the Second Italian War of Independence. In 1866, the regiment fought in the Third Italian War of Independence. In February 1897, the regiment was allowed to inherit the awards and traditions of the Regiment "Dragoni del Re". I

During World War I the regiment formed together with the Regiment "Lancieri di Novara" (5th) the II Cavalry Brigade of the 1st Cavalry Division "Friuli". The two regiments fought dismounted in the trenches of the Italian Front. In 1916, the two regiments fought dismounted in the trenches of the Italian Front. In September 1916, the Regiment "Genova Cavalleria" (4th) distinguished itself in the Seventh Battle of the Isonzo at Monfalcone, for which the regiment was awarded a Silver Medal of Military Valor. In October 1917, after the Italian defeat in the Battle of Caporetto, the II Cavalry Brigade stalled, together with the Brigade "Bergamo", the Austro-Hungarian advance in the Battle of Pozzuolo del Friuli, which allowed the Italian 3rd Army to retreat intact over the Tagliamento river. For their conduct at Pozzuolo del Friuli both regiments of the II Cavalry Brigade were awarded a Silver Medal of Military Valor. During World War II the regiment was deployed in occupied Yugoslavia on anti-partisan duty. After the announcement of the Armistice of Cassibile on 8 September 1943 the regiment's depot in Rome organized an ad hoc battle group, which, with other units, defended Rome against invading German forces.

In November 1946, the Italian Army formed the 4th Dragoons Reconnaissance Group, which received the regiment's traditions and yellow gorget patches. In 1949, the group was expanded to 4th Armored Cavalry Regiment "Genova Cavalleria". In 1957, the regiment was assigned to the Cavalry Brigade, which in 1959 was renamed Cavalry Brigade "Pozzuolo del Friuli". In 1975, the regiment was disbanded and its I Squadrons Group became an autonomous unit and was renamed 4th Mechanized Squadrons Group "Genova Cavalleria". The squadrons group was assigned the traditions and standard of the Regiment "Genova Cavalleria" (4th). In 1993, the squadrons group lost its autonomy and entered the Regiment "Genova Cavalleria" (4th). The same year the regiment was equipped with wheeled Centauro tank destroyers.

The regiment's anniversary falls on 21 April 1796, to commemorate the regiment's conduct during the Battle of Mondovì, for which the regiment was awarded two Gold Medals of Military Valor. As one of the two Italian Army dragoon regiments, whose history dates back to the 17th century, the regiment's enlisted personnel is addressed as "Dragoon" (Italian: Dragone).

== History ==
=== Formation ===
On 26 January 1683, Victor Amadeus II, Duke of Savoy issued a decree to form the first permanent cavalry regiment in his dominions. With the same decree Victor Amadeus II nominated Manfredo Giuseppe Scaglia, Count of Verrua as the regiment's first commander and established that the regiment had to be mustered within the following two months. The regiment, which was initially named Dragoons of Verrua, consisted of a staff of 18 officers and six companies of 50 dragoons each. As the regiment's troops were dressed in blue uniforms the regiment was also known as the "Dragons Bleus". A few months after its founding the regiment, which was based in Pinerolo, was given the name Regiment "Dragoni di Sua Altezza Reale" (Regiment "Dragoons of His Royal Highness").

In 1684, the regiment added two additional companies. On 7 October 1689, a second dragoon regiment was formed, which was initially known as Dragons Verts due to their green uniforms. On 4 July 1690, in preparation for the entry of Savoy into the Nine Years' War, a third dragoon regiment was formed, which was initially known as Dragons Jaunes due to their yellow uniforms. During the same year the Dragons Verts were given the name Regiment "Dragoni del Génévois" (Regiment "Dragoons of Génévois"), while the Dragons Jaunes were given the name Regiment "Dragoni di Piemonte" (Regiment "Dragoons of Piedmont"). While the Regiment "Dragoni di Piemonte" remained at its garrison to recruit and train its freshly levied troops, the regiments "Dragoni di Sua Altezza Reale" and "Dragoni del Génévois" fought on 18 August 1690 in the Battle of Staffarda. In January 1691, the Regiment "Dragoni di Sua Altezza Reale" was sent to reinforce the Regiment "Dragoni di Piemonte" at Avigliana Castle, which blocked the route to Turin to the French. On 28 May 1691, French troops stormed the castle, and while the garrison's infantry troops were taken prisoner, the two dragoons regiments escaped the same fate on their horses.

On 23 July 1692, two additional cavalry regiments were formed: the Regiment Cavaglià, which was soon renamed Cavalry Regiment "Piemonte Reale" and the Regiment Montbrison, which was renamed Cavalry Regiment "Savoia". In 1693, the Savoyard Army's three dragoon regiments added a ninth company and then fielded 36 officers and 450 dragoons. On 4 October 1693, all five Savoyard cavalry regiments fought in the Battle of Marsaglia. In 1696, the Regiment "Dragoni di Sua Altezza Reale" fought in the Siege of Valenza. On 29 August 1696, France and Savoy signed the Treaty of Turin, which ended the latter's involvement in the war, followed on 20 September 1697, by the Peace of Ryswick, which ended the Nine Years' War. Consequently, the Savoyard Army's three dragoon regiments were reduced from nine to eight companies, with each company fielding 35 dragoons. On 22 November 1699, the Cavalry Regiment "Savoia" was disbanded and its personnel and horses transferred to the Cavalry Regiment "Piemonte Reale" and Regiment "Dragoni di Sua Altezza Reale".

=== Cabinet Wars ===
==== War of the Spanish Succession ====
In March 1701, Duke Victor Amadeus II joined the War of the Spanish Succession on the French side. At the time the Savoyard Army's dragoon regiments fielded a staff and eight companies, which were grouped in four squadrons. Each company fielded 60 dragoons, while the regiment's staff consisted of 30 officers. On 15 August 1702, the regiments "Dragoni di Sua Altezza Reale", "Dragoni del Génévois", "Piemonte Reale" and "Savoia" fought in the Battle of Luzzara. In 1703, Victor Amadeus II entered secret negotiations with the anti-French Second Grand Alliance and in October of that year declared war on France. On 24 December of the same year, the Regiment "Dragoni di Sua Altezza Reale" added a fifth squadron of two companies and then fielded some 700 men.

By 1706, France had occupied most of the territories of Victor Amadeus II, leaving only his capital Turin in his possession. On 2 June 1706, a French army led by Louis de la Feuillade began to besiege Turin. Victor Amadeus II left the Austrian general Philipp von Daun in command of defences of Turin and escaped from the city on 17 June with 7,000 Austrian and Savoyard cavalry. Two days later the French closed the siege ring around the city. Meanwhile, further East, a French field army under Philippe II, Duke of Orléans maneuvered to prevent an Imperial army led by Austrian field marshal Prince Eugene of Savoy from coming to the relief of Turin. Attempting to buy time for Prince Eugene, Victor Amadeus II spent the next two months attacking French supply lines with his cavalry. On 15 August, Prince Eugene began his advance on Turin, easily evading Orléans' covering force. On 29 August, he reached Carmagnola south of Turin, where he was joined by Victor Amadeus II. Aware of Prince Eugene's approach, Orléans joined La Feuillade, and their combined force made three assaults on Turin between 27 August and 3 September. On 5 September, the Savoyard-Imperial army concentrated at Collegno, between the Dora Riparia and the Stura di Lanzo rivers near a weak spot in the French lines. On 7 September, Prince Eugene divided his force into eight columns and ordered an all out attack on the French forces. Victor Amadeus II personally led his cavalry regiments into the fray and, after crossing the Stura di Lanzo river, charged the Duke of Orleans and his entourage. Wounded by a cavalier of the Cavalry Regiment "Piemonte Reale" Orleans retreated from the battlefield, while Victor Amadeus II with the call "A moi mes dragons" led the Regiment "Dragoni di Sua Altezza Reale" against a French cavalry regiment coming to the aid of the Duke of Orleans. The charge dispersed the French cavalry regiment and the Savoyard dragoons captured the French regiment's timpani. Afterwards Victor Amadeus II led the regiments "Dragoni di Sua Altezza Reale" and "Dragoni del Génévois" to the bridges over the Po river to block the French's route of escape.

The next day, the allied cavalry was sent in pursuit of the fleeing French forces. For the courage shown in the previous day's battle Victor Amadeus II allowed the Regiment "Dragoni di Sua Altezza Reale" to keep and use the captured timpani. These timpani remained in service with the regiment until 1821.

On 12 July 1711, the regiments "Dragoni di Sua Altezza Reale", "Dragoni del Génévois", and "Savoia" captured Conflans, liberated Annecy and Chambéry, and drove the fleeing French back to Montmélian. On 14 March 1713, France and Savoy signed a truce, while the other belligerents signed the first of the treaties of the Peace of Utrecht, which transferred the Kingdom of Sicily and parts of the Duchy of Milan to Savoy and confirmed the 1708 transfer of the Duchy of Montferrat to the House of Savoy. On 27 March of the same year, the Regiment "Dragoni di Sua Altezza Reale" transferred two of its companies to the Regiment "Dragoni di Piemonte", while the remaining eight companies were grouped into two squadrons.

In October 1713, Victor Amadeus II and his wife, Anne Marie d'Orléans, travelled from Nice to Palermo, where, on 24 December 1713, they were crowned in the cathedral of Palermo King and Queen of Sicily. Consequently, the Regiment "Dragoni di Sua Altezza Reale" was renamed Regiment "Dragoni di Sua Maestà" (Regiment "Dragoons of His Majesty").

==== War of the Polish Succession ====
On 3 September 1730, Victor Amadeus II abdicated the throne and his son ascended the throne as King Charles Emmanuel III of Sardinia, who had been the commanding officer of the Regiment "Dragoni di Piemonte" from 1722 to 1729. On 1 February 1733, King Augustus II of Poland died and King Louis XV of France supported his father-in-laws Stanisław Leszczyński's claim to the throne, which was opposed by Austria, Prussia, Saxony and Russia. Throughout summer of 1733, the French prepared for the war and after secret negotiations with Charles Emmanuel III the Treaty of Turin was signed, which allowed the French to move their armies through Sardinian territory and promised the Duchy of Milan to Charles Emmanuel III. On 10 October 1733, the War of the Polish Succession began and Charles Emmanuel III immediately invaded the Duchy of Milan with 50,000 French-Spanish and Sardinian troops and on 3 November Milan, albeit not the city's fortress, surrendered to Charles Emmanuel III. In December 1733, the five Sardinian cavalry regiments were increased from eight to ten companies of 50 men per company.

On 29 June 1734, the French-Sardinian armies, which included the regiments "Dragoni di Piemonte", "Piemonte Reale" and "Savoia", clashed with Austrian forces in the Battle of San Pietro near Parma. On 19 September 1734, Charles Emmanuel III was personally present when the French-Sardinian army, including all five Sardinian cavalry regiments, defeated the Austrians in the Battle of Guastalla. In October 1735, the war ended with a preliminary peace agreement, which was ratified in the Treaty of Vienna in November 1738. Although Charles Emmanuel III did not receive the Duchy of Milan, he was compensated with the Milanese territories West of the Ticino river, including Novara and Tortona.

On 23 November 1736, the Royal Sardinian Army formed a sixth cavalry regiment with men and horses drawn from the existing five cavalry regiments. The core of the new regiment consisted of a Hussars company, which had been formed on 20 July 1734 with Hungarian exiles, who wished to fight against Austria. The new regiment, which consisted, like all other Sardinian cavalry regiments, of ten companies was given the name Regiment "Dragoni della Regina" (Regiment "Dragoons of the Queen").

In 1737, each dragoon and cavalry company was issued five rifled carabines, which had greater accuracy than the standard firearms provided to the Sardinian cavalry. In the four dragoon regiments, the men equipped with these carabiners were given the name "Granatieri" (Grenadiers), while in the two cavalry regiments they were given the name "Carabinieri" (Carabiniers). If needed, each regiment could unite these men in a company of 50 men.

==== War of the Austrian Succession ====
On 20 October 1740, Emperor Charles VI died, which led to the First Silesian War, which in turn triggered the War of the Austrian Succession. In 1741, an army of 40,000 Spaniards and Neapolitans marched North from central Italy with the aim to conquering the Duchy of Milan. The aggressiveness of the Spanish in Italy led to Empress Maria Theresa of Austria and Charles Emmanuel III to sign, on 1 February 1742, the Convention of Turin, which formed an alliance between the two countries. Immediately afterwards, Sardinian forces, including 18 cavalry squadrons of 110 men each, were sent to occupy the Duchy of Modena, whose ruler, Francesco III d'Este, Duke of Modena had allied himself with the Spanish. In May 1742, all six Sardinian cavalry regiments clashed with Spanish forces in the Emilia region in northern Italy. Meanwhile, another Spanish Army had crossed France and occupied the Duchy of Savoy. In September 1742, Charles Emmanuel III led the majority of his army, including the regiments "Dragoni di Sua Maestà" and "Dragoni di Piemonte", over the Little St Bernard Pass and by 15 October the entire Duchy of Savoy had been liberated. However, in early December, the Spanish were reinforced and invaded Savoy again, which forced Charles Emmanuel III to retreat to Piedmont. In the meantime in northern Italy the Spanish Army had crossed into the Duchy of Modena, where, on 8 February 1743, the Austrian-Sardinian and Spanish armies clashed in the Battle of Campo Santo. At Campo Santo the regiments "Savoia" and "Dragoni della Regina" fought bravely and suffered heavy casualties, including the latter regiment's commanding officer Colonel Filippo Perucard Ballone.

On 13 September 1743, Charles Emmanuel III, Maria Theresa and Britain signed the Treaty of Worms, intended to expel Spain from Italy. In return for Sardinia's support, the Austrians ceded all their territories west of the river Ticino and Lake Maggiore, along with their lands South of the Po river, to Charles Emmanuel III. In return, Charles Emmanuel III renounced his claim to the Duchy of Milan, guaranteed the Pragmatic Sanction, and provided 40,000 troops, paid for by Britain. The following month, French forces invaded Piedmont through the Val Varaita and at Casteldelfino a Sardinian blocking force, which included the grenadier companies of the regiments "Dragoni di Sua Maestà", "Dragoni del Génévois", "Dragoni di Piemonte" and "Dragoni della Regina", stopped the invasion in the First Battle of Casteldelfino. In 1744, France and Spain planned to jointly invade Piedmont and the cavalry's grenadiers and carabiniers, as well as dismounted dragoons, were deployed along with infantry units to defend the mountain passes across the Alps. On 19 July 1744, the French-Spanish army won the Second Battle of Casteldelfino, which opened the way through the Val Varaita into Piedmont. Once clear of the mountains the French-Spanish Army turned South and besieged Cuneo. On 30 September 1744, Charles Emmanuel III attempted to lift the siege of Cuneo in the Battle of Madonna dell'Olmo, during which the Regiment "Dragoni di Piemonte" was called forth to stabilize the Sardinian front in a critical moment and did so at the cost of more than 50 of its men.

On 26 June 1745, the Republic of Genoa declared war on Sardinia and allowed a French-Spanish Army to cross into Piedmont through its territory. On 27 September 1745, a French-Spanish-Genovan army defeated Charles Emmanuel III in the Battle of Bassignano. To cover the retreat of the six Sardinian cavalry regiments, the regiments' grenadiers and carabiniers were sent to cover the retreat with precise rifle fire. Initially the grenadiers and carabiniers held the enemy cavalry at bay, until a French brigade of dragoons overcame them and charged the last of the retreating Sardinian cavalry regiments, the Regiment "Dragoni di Piemonte", which lost 9 officers and 160 dragons in the ensuing fight.

The following year, on 16 June 1746, the Austrians defeated the French and Spanish in the Battle of Piacenza. By August of the same year, the Sardinian Army was encamped at Borghetto Lodigiano, while the Austrian Army was at Piacenza. On 8 August 1746, the regiments "Dragoni di Sua Maestà", "Dragoni di Piemonte", and "Savoia" detached each a squadron of two cavalry companies, which were sent to Piacenza to support the Austrians. On 10 August, the Austrians and French-Spanish forces clashed in the Battle of Rottofreddo along the Tidone river. Over the course of the day, the three Sardinian squadrons charged they enemy seven times: around 8h in the morning the squadrons charged enemy infantry to allow the Austrians to position themselves for the battle. Sometime after 11h the squadrons charged enemy units, which attempted to occupy the farm houses along the Tidone river. Afterwards the "Dragoni di Sua Maestà" and "Dragoni di Piemonte" charged the French Régiment du duc d'Anjou, with the "Dragoni di Sua Maestà" capturing one of the regiment's battalion and two of its flags, while the "Dragoni di Piemonte" captured one flag. At this moment three squadrons of the French Régiment de Dauphin-cavalerie charged the two Sardinian squadrons, which sacrificed a rearguard to 30 dragoons to allow the remainder of the squadrons to return to their own lines with the captured flags and prisoners. Shortly afterwards French troops tried to occupy houses along the Via Emilia and the squadron of the regiment "Savoia" was sent forward to charge and disperse the enemy. After 14h the three Sardinian squadrons charged enemy cavalry a further three times, during which the squadrons captured a standard of the French Régiment du Dauphin dragons and a standard of the Spanish Regimiento "Lusitania", 10.º de Dragones.

Negotiations between Britain and France had been taking place at Breda since June 1746; the terms they agreed were then imposed on the other parties at Aachen, where between 18 October 1748 and 21 January 1749 all parties signed the Treaty of Aix-la-Chapelle, which ended the war.

=== Victor Amadeus III's reforms ===
On 20 February 1773, King Charles Emmanuel III died and was succeeded by his son Victor Amadeus III, who set out to reform the Royal Sardinian Army. The army's cavalry regiments were assigned to the newly formed Department of the Cavalry, which consisted of a Wing of Dragoons and a Wing of Cavalry. Both wings consisted of two brigades of two regiments. On 28 August 1774, Victor Amadeus III ordered to complete the reform by forming two new cavalry regiments. On 16 September 1774, the regiments "Dragoni di Sua Maestà", "Dragoni di Piemonte" and "Dragoni della Regina" ceded each two companies to help form the Regiment "Dragoni del Chiablese", while the regiments "Dragoni del Génévois", "Piemonte Reale" and "Savoia" ceded each two companies to help form the Cavalry Regiment "Aosta". At the same time the Regiment "Dragoni del Génévois" was renamed Regiment "Cavalleggeri di Sua Maestà" (Regiment "Chevau-légers of His Majesty"). Each regiment consisted of a staff and eight companies grouped in four squadrons. After the reform the Sardinian Cavalry, which excluded the Dragoons of Sardinia stationed in Sardinia, consisted of the following units:

Department of the Cavalry
Wing of Dragoons		Wing of Cavalry	
Brigade "Dragoni di Sua Maestà"	Brigade "Dragoni di Piemonte"	Brigade "Cavalleggeri di Sua Maestà"	Brigade "Piemonte Reale"
Regiment "Dragoni di Sua Maestà"	Regiment "Dragoni di Piemonte"	Regiment "Cavalleggeri di Sua Maestà"	Cavalry Regiment "Piemonte Reale"
Regiment "Dragoni della Regina"	Regiment "Dragoni del Chiablese"	Cavalry Regiment "Savoia"	Cavalry Regiment "Aosta"

Victor Amadeus III also ordered to issue the cavalry regiments identical standards: cavalry regiments were issued a square standard, while dragoon regiments were issued a square standard with a dual swallowtail. The newly formed chevau-léger regiment was issued a square standard with a single central triangle protruding from the square. All cavalry regiment's were issued the same azure uniform, albeit with different colored cuffs, collars, buttons, and lining, whose color combination was unique and reflected in the colors of the regiment's standard. Furthermore, Victor Amadeus III regulated the training of new recruits, introduced the rank of Sergeant, and codified the cavalry's regimental music.

=== French Revolutionary Wars ===
==== War of the First Coalition ====
On 21 September 1792, French forces invaded the Duchy of Savoy and on 29 September the County of Nice. These unprovoked French attacks led to King Victor Amadeus III joining the War of the First Coalition against the French Republic. At the time the Sardinian cavalry fielded some 4,000 troops in eight regiments, each of which consisted of four squadrons of two companies. Additionally in Sardinia the Corps of Light Dragoons of Sardinia consisted of two squadrons of two companies. In Savoy the Regiment "Cavalleggeri di Sua Maestà" and two squadrons of the Regiment "Dragoni della Regina" resisted with infantry units the French invasion, but soon had to retreat over the Little Saint Bernard Pass to Aosta. In Nice two squadrons of the Regiment "Dragoni di Sua Maestà", two squadrons of the Regiment "Dragoni di Piemonte" and one squadron of the Cavalry Regiment "Aosta" fought against the French invaders, albeit also in this case the outnumbered Sardinian troops had to retreat into Piedmont. In June of the following year, an attempt by the French Army of Italy to invade Piedmont was defeated by Austrian-Sardinian forces in the First Battle of Saorgio. An attempt by Sardinia to liberate Savoy from French occupation was defeated in September of the same year in the Battle of Epierre.

During the winter of 1792–93, the French attempts to land in Sardinia were defeated by local troops and the Light Dragoons of Sardinia. On 21 May 1793, King Victor Amadeus III established a new reward for non-commissioned officers and soldiers of the Royal Sardinian Army and Royal Sardinian Navy, who had performed exceptional acts of valor. The Gold Medal of Military Valor and Silver Medal of Military Valor were to be awarded by a regiment's commanding officer in front of the entire regiment assembled in arms. On 7–8 September 1793, a Sardinian attempt to drive the French out of Nice failed, but during the attack and following retreat the regiments "Dragoni di Sua Maestà" and "Dragoni della Regina" distinguished themselves. On 1 October of the same year, in the Tarentaise Valley French forces clashed with troops of the Regiment "Dragoni del Chiablese", during which Sergeant Girolamo Musso distinguished himself. For the valor shown Musso was awarded, as first among the members of the cavalry, a Silver Medal of Military Valor.

In April 1794, the Army of Italy went on the offensive and defeated the Austrian-Sardinian forces in the Second Battle of Saorgio. On 21 September of the same year the Army of Italy won the First Battle of Dego, but the French did not follow their victory with an invasion of Piedmont and instead occupied part the Western part of the Republic of Genoa. On 3 February 1795, the two squadrons of the Light Dragoons of Sardinia were transferred to Piedmont. In summer of 1795, a joint Austrian-Sardinian Army defeated the Army of Italy in the Battle of Monte Settepani, but in turn the Army of Italy defeated the allies in the Battle of Loano on 23–24 November of the same year.

==== Montenotte campaign ====
On 27 March 1796, Napoleon Bonaparte arrived in Italy and took command of the Army of Italy. On 10 April, Austrian forces defeated a French brigade in the Battle of Voltri near Genoa. Two days later, on 12 April, Napoleon counterattacked and defeated an Austrian-Sardinian Army in the Battle of Montenotte. Over the next two days, 13 and 14 April, the two sides clashed in smaller battles in Liguria, which Napoleon, as the victor, named the Battle of Millesimo. On 14–15 April, Napoleon defeated the Austrians and Sardinians in the Second Battle of Dego, followed by a French victory over Sardinian forces the next day, 16 April, in the Battle of Ceva. As the Austrians now retreated towards Lombardy, Napoleon turned his attention to the Sardinians and drove the Sardinian army relentlessly westward toward the fortress of Cuneo and the plains of Piedmont.

On 18 April, the Sardinians retreated into a strong position behind the Corsaglia river to the east of Mondovì. On 20 April, the two sides clashed with the fiercest fighting occurring in and around the town of San Michele Mondovì. During the night of 20–21 April, the Sardinians retreated further behind the Ellero river. However, the rapid French pursuit caught up with the Sardinian rearguard in the village of Vicoforte. The Sardinian forces then began a hasty retreat and the Sardinian cavalry was deployed to cover the infantry's retreat. Napoleon ordered General Henri Christian Michel de Stengel, who commanded the 1st Cavalry Division, which consisted of the 1er Régiment de hussards, 5^{e} Régiment de dragons, 20^{e} Régiment de dragons, 22^{e} Régiment de chasseurs à cheval and 24^{e} Régiment de chasseurs à cheval, to cross the Ellero river and prevent the escape of the Sardinian Army.

Instead of charging blindly into the fray, Stengel took a small escort on a reconnaissance ride along the Tanaro river. At the confluence of Ellero and Tanaro Stengel found the Ellero river's other side occupied by the Regiment "Dragoni del Chiablese" and therefore decided to ride towards Briaglia, where Napoleon's aide-de-camp Colonel Joachim Murat and the 5^{e} Régiment de dragons caught up with him. Murat informed Stengel that Napoleon had ordered to hurry with the cavalry's deployment. Stengel then assumed command of the 5^{e} Régiment de dragons and ordered Murat ride back to the Tanaro river and bring up the 20^{e} Régiment de dragons, while General Marc Antoine de Beaumont was ordered to ride and fetch the 1er Régiment de hussards and 22^{e} Régiment de chasseurs à cheval. Stengel and the 300 troops under his command then crossed the Ellero and moved towards the road from Mondovì to Cherasco, which was clogged by the retreating Sardinian Army. Instead of attacking Stengel arrayed his forces in a line and waited for reinforcements. Now aware of the French cavalry the I and III squadrons of the Regiment "Dragoni di Sua Maestà", which had been covering the Sardinian retreat since morning, moved to the Mondovì to Cherasco road, where the two squadrons lined up parallel to the road and then charged the French cavalry. In the ensuing melee Stengel was gravely wounded and taken prisoner, while three of his staff officers killed. Within minutes the 5^{e} Régiment de dragons suffered heavy losses and broke. Pursued by the Sardinian dragoons, the French troops fled back across the Ellero river.

On 22–24 April, the regiments "Dragoni di Sua Maestà", "Dragoni di Piemonte" and "Dragoni della Regina" covered the Sardinian retreat and repeatedly clashed with French cavalry units under the command of Colonel Murat, who led the pursuit. However, the defeat at Mondovì and the retreat of the Austrian army towards northeastern Italy, left King Victor Amadeus III no other option but to sign on 28 April the Armistice of Cherasco. On 5 May 1796, the Regiment "Dragoni di Sua Maestà" was awarded two Gold Medal of Military Valor by order of King Victor Amadeus III, who declared that "one [Gold Medal] is not enough to reward so much valor". The King also commanded that the two medals were affixed to the regiment's standard, which began the Italian military's tradition to affix all awards to its units flags and standards.

On 15 May 1796, Sardinia signed Treaty of Paris, which forced Sardinia out of the First Coalition. The treaty also codified the transfer of the Duchy of Savoy and the County of Nice to France, gave the French Army free passage through the Kingdom of Sardinia, and imposed a limit of 10,000 troops on the Royal Sardinian Army. On 16 October of the same year, King Victor Amadeus III died and his eldest son Charles Emmanuel IV ascended the throne. Ten days later, on 26 October 1796, the new king ordered to reform and reduce the size of the Royal Sardinian Army and, on the same day, the army's two youngest cavalry regiments: "Dragoni del Chiablese" and "Aosta" were disbanded and their squadrons distributed among the remaining regiments. Similarly, the two squadrons of Light Dragoons of Sardinia were also disbanded and their companies assigned to other regiments. Thus the Regiment "Dragoni di Sua Maestà" incorporated the I Squadron of the Regiment "Dragoni del Chiablese" and the 1st Company of the Light Dragoons of Sardinia. As part of the reform the company level was abolished and after the reform each of the remaining six cavalry regiments consisted of four squadrons.

==== War of the Second Coalition ====
On 29 November 1798, the War of the Second Coalition began and French forces invaded Piedmont. Already on 6 December 1798, the French occupied Turin and took King Charles Emmanuel IV prisoner. On 8 December 1798, the King was forced to sign a document of abdication, which also ordered his former subjects to recognise French laws and his troops to obey the orders of the French Revolutionary Army. Afterwards, King Charles Emmanuel IV was released and went into exile on the island of Sardinia, while his former territories became the French controlled Piedmontese Republic. On 9 December 1798, the Sardinian troops were released from their oath of allegiance to the King and sworn to the Piedmontese Republic. Soon afterwards, the Regiment "Dragoni di Sua Maestà" was renamed 1st Cavalry Regiment and sent to Ferrara.

In January 1799, the regiment was renamed 1st Piedmontese Dragoons Regiment (Italian: 1° Reggimento Dragoni Piemontesi), while the 5th Cavalry Regiment (former Regiment "Dragoni della Regina") and 6th Cavalry Regiment (former Cavalry Regiment "Savoia") were disbanded. At the time, the 1st Piedmontese Dragoons Regiment received two squadrons from the disbanded 5th Cavalry Regiment. In spring of 1799, the regiment fought with the French Army of Italy against the Austrian and Russian armies. On 5 April 1799, the regiment fought in the Battle of Magnano, which the Austrians won. After series of further battles the French were driven out of Italy. With the French retreat the Piedmontese Republic dissolved and the 1st Piedmontese Dragoons Regiment, like all regiments of the Piedmontese Republic, was disbanded on 10 May 1799 by the victorious Austrians.

In May 1800, Napoleon returned to Italy with a 60,000-man Army and in the following weeks defeated the Austrians in the Marengo campaign. On 14 June 1800, Napoleon won the Battle of Marengo and the next day the Austrian General Michael von Melas signed the Convention of Alessandria, which obliged the Austrians to retreat behind the Po and Mincio rivers. The French then created the Subalpine Republic to rule over the former territories of the kings of Sardinia. The new government in Turin then formed a dragoon regiment and a hussar regiment with personnel drawn from the disbanded Sardinian cavalry regiments. On 26 August 1801, Napoleon decreed that the military units of the Subalpine Republic were to be integrated the French Revolutionary Army. Thus the dragoon regiment became the 21^{e} Régiment de dragons, while the hussar regiment became the 26^{e} Régiment de chasseurs à cheval. Both regiments served in the campaigns of the Napoleonic Wars until May 1814, when they were disbanded after the Napoleon's abdication.

=== Restoration ===
On 4 June 1802, the exiled King Charles Emmanuel IV abdicated and the throne of the Kingdom of Sardinia passed to his younger brother Victor Emmanuel I. Due to French annexation of Piedmont Victor Emmanuel I only ruled the island of Sardinia for the next twelve years. On 6 April 1814, Napoleon abdicated and on 11 April the winners of the War of the Sixth Coalition exiled him to the island of Elba. On 20 May 1814, King Victor Emmanuel I returned from exile in Sardinia to Turin. Four days later, on 24 May 1814, the King ordered to begin the process of rebuilding the Royal Sardinian Army and the first four cavalry regiments ordered to reform were the Regiment "Dragoni di Sua Maestà", which was renamed Regiment "Dragoni del Re", Regiment "Dragoni della Regina", Regiment "Dragoni di Piemonte", and Regiment "Cavalleggeri di Sua Maestà", which was renamed Regiment "Cavalleggeri del Re".

The process of reforming the cavalry regiments proved to be difficult as Victor Emmanuel I forbade to take officers and soldiers into service, who had served in Napoleon's French Imperial Army, and for a lack of horses. In July 1814, the Victor Emmanuel I ordered to reform the Cavalry Regiment "Piemonte Reale", which was renamed Regiment "Piemonte Reale Cavalleria". In August 1814, the Sardinian government bought 1,400 light cavalry horses from Austria, which were taken from the Imperial Austrian Army's cavalry regiments leaving Italy. The first 600 horses were delivered immediately and the remainder in December. Due to the lack of heavy cavalry horses the Regiment "Dragoni di Piemonte" was now destined to become a Chevau-léger regiment and renamed Regiment "Cavalleggeri di Piemonte". On 1 December 1814, Victor Emmanuel I ordered to reform the Cavalry Regiment "Savoia", which was renamed Regiment "Savoia Cavalleria". Due to a lack of qualified volunteers, Victor Emmanuel I relented and also allowed officers and soldiers, who had served in the regiments of Napoleon's French Imperial Army, to join the reformed cavalry regiments.

On 1 January 1815, all six cavalry regiments were reformed and the Sardinian cavalry then consisted of the dragoon regiments "Dragoni del Re" and "Dragoni della Regina", which were formed in Turin, the Chevau-léger regiments "Cavalleggeri del Re" and "Cavalleggeri di Piemonte", which were formed in Carignano, and the heavy cavalry regiments "Piemonte Reale Cavalleria" and "Savoia Cavalleria", which were formed in Venaria Reale. Besides the six regiments based in Piedmont the cavalry also included the Regiment "Cavalleggeri di Sardegna" in Sardinia, which had been out of Napoleon's reach and thus never been disbanded. Each regiment consisted of a staff and six squadrons, which were grouped into three divisions. The divisions were commanded by and named for the three highest-ranking officers of a regiment: the first division was commanded by and named for the regiment's Colonel, the second division for the regiment's Lieutenant Colonel, and the third division for the regiment's Major. The squadrons, which were numerated 1st to 6th, were commanded by a captain and consisted of 100 men, grouped into two half ranks of 50 men, which in turn were commanded by a Subaltern. In total each regiment fielded 635 men and 548 horses.

In September 1814, the Congress of Vienna began, at which the European powers decided the new layout of the European political and constitutional order after the downfall of the Napoleon. The Congress confirmed the return of the Duchy of Savoy and the County of Nice to Sardinia, and by October had decided that the Republic of Genoa would not be reestablished and its territory given to the Kingdom of Sardinia. On 7 January 1815, the British forces in Genoa handed control of the city to the Piedmontese General Ignazio Thaon di Revel and the former Republic was incorporated into the Kingdom of Sardinia as Duchy of Genoa.

On 26 February 1815, Napoleon escaped from Elba and landed on 1 March 1815 in Golfe-Juan in France. This triggered the War of the Seventh Coalition, in which the Kingdom of Sardinia fought against France. The Royal Sardinian Army quickly formed a corps, which included the regiments "Cavalleggeri del Re" and "Cavalleggeri di Piemonte", that moved to secure Savoy. The corps then advanced to Grenoble, which was attacked on 6 July. On 9 July the city surrendered and the Sardinian forces moved to occupy Lyon, which surrendered to an Austrian-Sardinian force on 11 July. On 15 July 1815, Napoleon surrendered to Captain Frederick Maitland of the Royal Navy and was taken as prisoner to England. After the war the Sardinian forces occupied the Dauphiné region between the Duchy of Savoy and the County of Nice. On 20 November 1815, the Treaty of Paris was signed, which ended the Napoleonic wars and the Regiment "Cavalleggeri di Piemonte" left the Dauphiné and moved to Chambery in the Duchy of Savoy.

On 2 June 1819, the Regiment "Cavalleggeri di Sardegna" was merged with the Corps of Musketeers of Sardinia and thus the Sardinian cavalry was reduced to six regiments. On 23 June of the same year, the Regiment "Savoia Cavalleria", due to continuing lack of heavy horses, was reorganized as a Chevau-léger regiment and renamed Regiment "Cavalleggeri di Savoia". The same year, the three Chevau-léger regiments were issued a shako, while the following year the dragoon regiments and cavalry regiment were issued a metal Dragoon helmet. At the time the dragoons were armed with a flintlock musket, two flintlock pistols, and a sabre, while the cavaliers of the Regiment "Piemonte Reale Cavalleria" were armed with a flintlock musket, two flintlock pistols, and a straight cavalry sword. The Chevau-légers were armed with a flintlock musket or carabine with a shorter barrel, two flintlock pistols, and a sabre.

=== Revolt of 1821 ===
In January 1820, mutinous troops compelled King Ferdinand VII of Spain to accept a liberal constitution. The Spanish example spread to Sicily, where on 15 June 1820 rebels seized the local arsenal. On 1 July 1820, troops and Carbonari rose up in Naples and King Ferdinand I of the Two Sicilies was forced to grant a constitution on 6 July. In November of the same year the revolutionary parliament of Naples used the Army of the Two Sicilies to suppress the revolt in Sicily. In January 1821, Ferdinand I left Naples to participate in the Congress of Laibach, which authorized an Austrian intervention to quell the liberal uprising in Naples. The following month 50,000 Austrian troops invaded Naples.

Meanwhile, in the Kingdom of Sardinia, King Victor Emmanuel I had abolished after his return from exile the freedoms granted by the Napoleonic Code and established an oppressive absolutist rule. The widespread resentment to this kind of rule, the wish for a constitution and a desire by a part of the Royal Sardinian Army's officers corps to declare war on Austria to aid the revolutionaries in Naples resulted in a conspiracy led by Annibale Santorre, Count of Santarosa to overthrow the Sardinian government and declare war on Austria. In the night of 6 to 7 March, Santorre and three fellow conspirators met with Prince Charles Albert, Prince of Carignano, a cousin of King Victor Emmanuel I and the second in line to the throne Sardinia, who did not dissuade them from their intentions. The next day, on 7 March 1821, the Austrian forces defeated the Neapolitan rebels in the Battle of Rieti, but nonetheless during the night from 9 to 10 March the Sardinian conspirators began their coup. In Alessandria the troops of the Regiment "Dragoni del Re" arrested their officers and, together with the troops of the Brigade of "Genova", took control of the city's citadel. However, in Turin the rebels were forced by loyal troops, which included the Regiment "Piemonte Reale Cavalleria", to abandon the city and move to Alessandria. In Pinerolo 300 troops of the Regiment "Cavalleggeri del Re" joined the rebellion and left for Alessandria. The Regiment "Dragoni della Regina" in Vercelli however ignored the pleas of its deputy commander to join the rebellion and followed the regiment's commander to Novara. Likewise, a small number of the dragons of the Regiment "Dragoni del Re", who did not wish to join the rebellion, left Alessandria and joined the loyal forces in Turin. However, the biggest setback for the rebellion was the arrest of the Colonel Carlo Morozzo, Count of San Michele, commander of the Regiment "Cavalleggeri di Piemonte", who had been tasked with bringing his regiment from Fossano to Moncalieri to arrest King Victor Emmanuel I.

On 12 March, troops of the Brigade of "Monferrato" rebelled and took over the citadel in Turin. King Victor Emmanuel I sent Charles Albert to treat with the troops, who refused to compromise on their demands. On his return to the Royal Palace of Turin, Charles Albert was followed by an immense crowd, which was dispersed by the Regiment "Piemonte Reale Cavalleria" before the palace's gates. Later on the same day, King Victor Emmanuel I, unwilling to grant a liberal constitution or call for a foreign military intervention, abdicated in favor of his brother, Charles Felix. Because Charles Felix was in Modena at the time, Victor Emmanuel nominated Charles Albert as regent until Charles Felix's arrival. Immediately after his abdication Victor Emmanuel, escorted by troops of the Regiment "Cavalleggeri di Savoia", left Turin for exile in Nice. In the evening of 13 March, Regent Charles Albert, under pressure by the rebellious troops and population of Turin, published a proclamation conceding to a Savoyard version of the Spanish Constitution of 1812. However, King Charles Felix sent word from Modena that the concession of the constitution was null and void, that he had request Austria to intervene, and that Charles Albert was ordered to move with all loyal forces to Novara. At midnight on 21 March 1821, Charles Albert secretly departed Turin with the regiments "Piemonte Reale Cavalleria" and "Cavalleggeri di Savoia.

Meanwhile, in Novara, after the arrival of 200 dragoons of the Regiment "Dragoni del Re" outside the city's walls, the Regiment "Dragoni della Regina" abandoned its posts and joined with the rebellion. In the evening of 21 March, the rebellion reached Genoa, where a violent crowd attempted to storm the government palace. However, a small detachment of the Regiment "Dragoni del Re" charged the crowd and dispersed it after a brief fight. On 23 March, Charles Albert arrived in Novara, but six days later King Charles Felix ordered him to depart immediately for exile in the Grand Duchy of Tuscany. By then also the Brigade of "Saluzzo" and the Brigade of "Alessandria" had joined the rebellion, which amassed its troops in Alessandria. Of the six Sardinian cavalry regiments, 270 troops of the Regiment "Dragoni del Re", 300 troops of the Regiment "Dragoni della Regina", 350 troops of the Regiment "Cavalleggeri del Re", and 160 troops of the Regiment "Cavalleggeri di Piemonte" had joined the rebellion and assembled in Alessandria – some 1,080 troops in total. On the other side the government could count on the regiments "Piemonte Reale Cavalleria" and "Cavalleggeri di Savoia", and four squadrons of the Regiment "Cavalleggeri di Piemonte" – some 1,250 troops.

On 4 April 1821, loyal forces left Novara with the intent to reach Turin and reestablish royal authority in the city. The next day, the rebel forces left Alessandria and moved to intercept the loyal forces. On 6 April, the loyal forces fell back to Novara, where on 7 April the rebels arrived outside the city. During the night of 7 to 8 April, Austrian forces crossed the Ticino river and by morning a combined force of loyal and Austrian forces attacked the rebels from two sides. Now aware of the strength of the Austrian forces, the rebels retreated towards Vercelli, with the cavalry units covering the retreat against pursuing Austrian hussars. Once the rebels reached Vercelli, their army dissolved and the Austro-Sardinian forces occupied the city. The Austrian forces then moved to suppress the rebellion in Alessandria, while the Sardinian forces, with the three loyal cavalry regiments in front, moved to suppress the rebellion in Turin. On 10 April, Turin surrendered, followed by Alessandria one day later. On 19 April 1821, King Charles Felix appointed Ignazio Thaon di Revel as Lieutenant General of the Kingdom and tasked him with restoring order in the state.

On 31 May 1821, the four infantry brigades (Brigade of "Monferrato", Brigade of "Saluzzo", Brigade of "Alessandria", and Brigade of "Genova"), which had participated in the rebellion, were stricken from the rolls of the Royal Sardinian Army and their personnel dismissed from service. On 1 August 1821, the three cavalry regiments (Regiment "Dragoni del Re", Regiment "Dragoni della Regina", Regiment "Cavalleggeri del Re"), which had sided with the rebels were disbanded. On the same day, the detachment of the Regiment "Dragoni del Re", which had dispersed the rebels in Genova on 21 March, was used form a new dragoon regiment in Pinerolo, which was named Regiment "Dragoni del Génévois". The Génévois was a dukedom surrounding the city of Geneva and Duke of Génévois was one of the titles of the House of Savoy. Although that name "Dragoni del Génévois" had already been used between 1690 and 1774 by the regiment, which would become the Regiment "Cavalleggeri del Re", the new regiment was not allowed any association with earlier regiments and therefore i.e. the timpani captured in 1706 by the Regiment "Dragoni di Sua Altezza Reale" and the two Gold Medals of Military Valor awarded in 1796 to the Regiment "Dragoni di Sua Maestà" were transferred to state treasury. The troops of the three disbanded regiments, who had refused to join the rebellion, were divided among the four remaining cavalry regiments, each of which consisted of a staff and six squadrons grouped into three divisions.

After these events the Sardinian cavalry consisted of one heavy cavalry regiment (Regiment "Piemonte Reale Cavalleria"), two chevau-léger regiments (Regiment "Cavalleggeri di Piemonte", Regiment "Cavalleggeri di Savoia") and one dragoon regiment (Regiment "Dragoni del Génévois"). In the following years the Regiment "Dragoni del Génévois" was expanded from six to eight squadrons, which were grouped into four divisions. At the time the regiment fielded 900 troops and 784 horses. On 24 December 1828, Regiment "Dragoni del Génévois", together with the other three cavalry regiments, ceded some of its personnel to help form a new Regiment "Dragoni di Piemonte".

On 27 April 1831, King Charles Felix died and Charles Albert ascended to the throne. On 29 August of the same year, all five Royal Sardinian Army cavalry regiments were reduced from eight to six squadrons and a depot squadron, which was to be formed in wartime and train new recruits. On the same date the division level was abolished. Later in the same year, on 3 November 1831, the personnel of the disbanded squadrons was used to reform the Regiment "Aosta Cavalleria". On 3 January 1832, the six Royal Sardinian Army cavalry regiments were renamed uniformly as "Cavalleria". At the same time the Regiment "Dragoni del Génévois" was renamed Regiment "Genova Cavalleria" in honor of Prince Ferdinando of Savoy, Duke of Genoa. The troops of five regiments, including the Regiment "Genova Cavalleria", were equipped with a flintlock musket, two flintlock pistols, and a sabre, while the troops of the Regiment "Piemonte Reale Cavalleria" continued to be equipped with a flintlock musket, two flintlock pistols, and a straight cavalry sword. With name change the identifying color of the Regiment "Genova Cavalleria" was defined as yellow, which is still used as the color of the regiment's gorget patches today.

On 7 March 1835, the six cavalry regiments were grouped into two brigades: the I Brigade consisted of the regiments "Nizza Cavalleria", "Savoia Cavalleria" and "Novara Cavalleria", while the II Brigade consisted of the regiments "Piemonte Reale Cavalleria", "Genova Cavalleria" and "Aosta Cavalleria". On 15 March 1836, the 6th Squadron of all six cavalry regiments was reorganized as a depot squadron. During the same year the troops of one squadron of each regiment, with the exception of the Regiment "Piemonte Reale Cavalleria", replaced their flintlock musket with a lance. On 4 October of the same year, the number of brigades was increased from two to three and the regiments were reassigned: the I Brigade consisted now of the regiments "Nizza Cavalleria" and "Genova Cavalleria", the II Brigade of the regiments "Piemonte Reale Cavalleria" and "Novara Cavalleria", and the III Brigade of the regiments "Savoia Cavalleria" and "Aosta Cavalleria".

In 1841, all six regiments were uniformly organized and equipped: the troops of the regiments' first four squadrons were equipped with a flintlock musket, two flintlock pistols, and a sabre, while the troops of the regiments' fifth squadron were equipped with a lance, two flintlock pistols, and a sabre. On 1 January 1842, the six regiments disbanded their depot squadrons. In 1843, each regiments equipped a second squadron with lances. On 17 March 1845, all six regiments replaced their flintlock muskets and flintlock pistols with a percussion pistolone — a pistol with a shoulder stock and were issued lances. Afterwards all of the regiment's troops were equipped with a lance, a pistolone and a sabre.

=== Italian Wars of Independence ===
==== First Italian War of Independence ====
In 1848 revolutionary riots broke out in many parts of Europe, including numerous places in Italy. In March 1848, the revolts also spread into the Austrian Empire, where Milan (Five Days of Milan) and Venice (Republic of San Marco) rebelled against the House of Habsburg. The battles were particularly heated in Milan, where the commander of the army of Lombardy–Venetia, Marshal Josef Radetzky, was forced to abandon the city. As a result of this, other revolts broke out in Lombardy–Venetia. With Vienna itself in revolt, the Austrian Empire was tottering. On 23 March, one day after the end of the Five Days of Milan, King Charles Albert of Sardinia declared war on Austria. Thus began the First Italian War of Independence.

On the same day King Charles Albert declared war the Royal Sardinian Army's six cavalry regiments reformed their depot squadrons. At the start of the campaign the cavalry's I Brigade was attached to the I Army Corps, while the II Brigade was attached to the II Army Corps, while the III Brigade was attached to the army reserve division. On 25 March 1848, King Charles Albert ordered to issue all cavalry regiments a 60 cm wide square standard in the colors of the Italian flag with the arms of Savoy displayed in the center of the white pale. After the start of the war the regiment's 1st Squadron clashed with Austrian forces at Marcaria and then the regiment was engaged against enemy forces at Villafranca. On 30 April 1848, the regiment fought in the Skirmish of Pastrengo and, on 6 May, in the Battle of Santa Lucia. On 30 May the regiment fought in the Battle of Goito. On 18 July 1848, during the Second Battle of Governolo the Regiment "Genova Cavalleria" captured the flag of the Austrian 52nd Infantry Regiment "Erzherzog Franz Karl". On 27 July, the regiment fought in the Battle of Volta Mantovana, after which King Charles Albert ordered a retreat towards Milan. On 9 August, the Austrian General Heinrich von Heß and the Sardinian General Carlo Canera di Salasco signed the Armistice of Salasco, which stated that Charles Albert's troops would withdraw from the whole of the Kingdom of Lombardy–Venetia, and the Duchy of Parma and Piacenza and Duchy of Modena and Reggio. Thus ended the war's First Campaign.

On 1 March 1849, the Sardinian Chamber of Deputies voted for the resumption of the war, with 94 votes in favour and 24 against. King Charles Albert decided that hostilities would resume on 20 March and, as stipulated in the 1848 armistice, the Austrians were informed about the continuation of the war eight days before the hostilities resumed. Charles Albert then massed his army near Novara. At noon on 20 March, the whole Austrian Army crossed the Ticino river at Pavia and marched North towards Mortara and Vigevano. On 21 March 1849, the Regiment "Genova Cavalleria" fought in the Battle of Sforzesca and two days later, on 23 March 1849, the regiment fought in the Battle of Novara, which resulted in a decisive defeat of the Sardinian forces. In the evening of the same day, King Charles Albert abdicated in favour of his son Victor Emmanuel. On 24 March, the new king met with Radetzky at Vignale and agreed to an armistice, which ended the short Second Campaign of the First Italian War of Independence.

After the defeat in the First Italian War of Independence the Kingdom of Sardinia reformed its military and, on 3 January 1850, the Regiment "Genova Cavalleria" ceded its 6th Squadron to form the depot squadron of the newly formed Regiment "Cavalleggeri di Monferrato". On the same date, the Regiment "Genova Cavalleria" was assigned to the Royal Sardinian Army's heavy cavalry and reduced to a staff, four squadrons, and a depot squadron. On 22 September 1852, the Sardinian War Ministry ordered that the four line cavalry regiments, including the Regiment "Genova Cavalleria", as well as the regiments "Cavalleggeri di Novara" and "Cavalleggeri di Aosta", should be armed with lance, sabre and pistolone.

==== Second Italian War of Independence ====
On 21 July 1858, French Emperor Napoleon III and the Prime Minister of Sardinia Camillo Benso, Count of Cavour met in Plombières and reached a secret verbal agreement on a military alliance between the French Empire and the Kingdom of Sardinia against the Austrian Empire. On 9 March 1859, Sardinia mobilized its army, followed by Austria on 9 April. On 23 April, Austria delivered an ultimatum to Sardinia demanding its demobilization. Upon Sardinia's refusal, Austria declared war on 26 April and three days later the Austrians crossed the Ticino river into Piedmont. Consequently, France honored its alliance with Sardinia and declared war on Austria on 3 May 1859, which led to the Second Italian War of Independence.

In the early stages of the war the Regiment "Genova Cavalleria" participated in the Sardinian advance across the Sesia river and, on 30 May 1859, the regiment fought in the Battle of Vinzaglio. On 11 July 1859, Emperor Napoleon III and Emperor Franz Joseph I met at Villafranca and concluded the Armistice of Villafranca, which ended the war. After the conclusion of the armistice the French and Sardinian armies occupied Lombardy. On 16 September 1859, the Royal Sardinian Army's nine cavalry regiments ceded one squadron each to help form three new Chevau-légers regiments and the three squadrons ceded by the cavalry regiments "Piemonte Reale Cavalleria", "Savoia Cavalleria", and "Genova Cavalleria" were used to form the Regiment "Cavalleggeri di Milano".

After having observed French cuirassier regiments, like the 12th Cuirassier Regiment, during the Second Italian War of Independence, the Royal Sardinian Army decided in October 1859 to reorganize its four line cavalry regiments as cuirassier regiments. Consequently, on 19 October 1859, the four regiments were renamed and the Regiment "Genova Cavalleria" was redesigned Regiment "Corazzieri di Genova" (Regiment "Cuirassiers of Genoa"). However, the four regiments were never issued cuirasses and, on 6 June 1860, the four regiments resumed their original names.

==== Third Italian War of Independence ====
On 20 June 1866, the Third Italian War of Independence between the Kingdom of Italy and the Austrian Empire began. During the war the Regiment "Genova Cavalleria" formed, together with the Regiment "Savoia Cavalleria", the I Cavalry of Brigade of the Line Cavalry Division. The division was assigned to the Army of the Mincio, which operated along the Mincio river. On 24 June 1866, two corps of the Army of the Mincio were defeated in the Battle of Custoza and the Line Cavalry Division was sent to cover the Italian retreat over the Mincio river. The focus of the campaign then shifted to the Army of the Po, which operated along the Po river and advanced from there into the Veneto.

In 1868–70, the regiment operated in Campania in southern Italy to suppress the anti-Sardinian revolt, which had erupted after the Kingdom of Sardinia had annexed the Kingdom of the Two Sicilies. During this time the regiment was based in Caserta and from 1870 in Naples.

On 10 September 1871, the regiment was renamed 4th Cavalry Regiment (Genova), and on 5 November 1876, Cavalry Regiment "Genova" (4th). In 1887, the regiment provided personnel and horses for the formation of the Mounted Hunters Squadron, which fought in the Italo-Ethiopian War of 1887–1889. In 1895–96, the regiment provided 69 enlisted for units deployed to Italian Eritrea for the First Italo-Ethiopian War.

In February 1897, the Cavalry Regiment "Genova" (4th) was allowed to resume the traditions of the Regiment "Dragoni del Re". Consequently, the regiment was returned the two Gold Medals of Military Valor, which had been awarded to the Regiment "Dragoni di Sua Maestà" in 1796. The two medals were then affixed to the regiment's standard, where they can still be found today. On 16 December 1897, the regiment was renamed Regiment "Genova Cavalleria" (4th).

On 1 October 1909, the regiment ceded its 3rd Squadron to help form the Regiment "Lancieri di Mantova" (25th). In 1911–12, the regiment provided 66 enlisted to units deployed for the Italo-Turkish War.

=== World War I ===
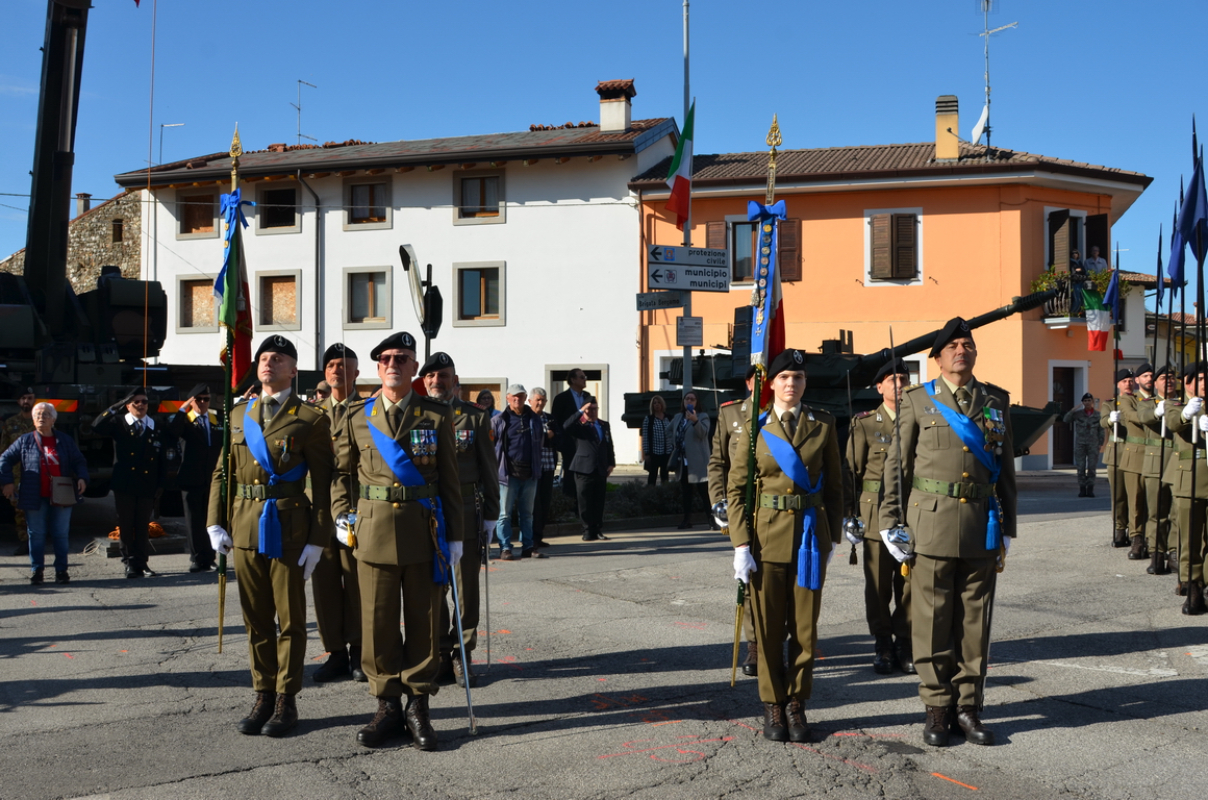
Regiment "Genova Cavalleria" (4th) and Regiment "Lancieri di Novara" (5th) standards at the 107th anniversary commemoration of the Battle of Pozzuolo del Friuli

At the outbreak of World War I the regiment consisted of a command, a depot, and two cavalry groups, with the I Group consisting of three squadrons and the II Group consisting of two squadrons and a machine gun section. Together with the Regiment "Lancieri di Novara" (5th) the regiment formed the II Cavalry Brigade, which was assigned to the 1st Cavalry Division "Friuli". In April 1916, the division was dismounted for service in the trenches of the Italian front. After being dismounted the regiment was reinforced by the dismounted 1st Squadron of the Regiment "Piemonte Reale Cavalleria" (2nd). On 11 May 1916, the 1st Cavalry Division "Friuli" entered the trenches at Plave in the center of the Isonzo front. In late July 1916, the 1st Cavalry Division "Friuli" and 4th Cavalry Division "Piemonte" switched places on the front, with the 1st Cavalry Division "Friuli" entering the trenches at Monfalcone below the Karst plateau, while the 4th Cavalry Division "Piemonte" entered the trenches at Plave. From 4 to 12 August 1916, the 1st Cavalry Division "Friuli" fought in the Sixth Battle of the Isonzo at Monfalcone. In September 1916, the 1st Cavalry Division fought in the Seventh Battle of the Isonzo, during which the Regiment "Genova Cavalleria" (4th) attacked, conquered and then defended Hill 144 to the east of Monfalcone. In December 1916, the 1st Cavalry Division "Friuli" was mounted on horses again and held in reserve.

In 1917, the regiment's depot in Pordenone formed the 733rd Dismounted Machine Gunners Company as reinforcement for the regiment. On 24 October 1917, the Imperial German Army and Austro-Hungarian Army began the Battle of Caporetto and already on the first day of the battle the German 14th Army broke through the Italian lines at Kobarid. All mounted Italian cavalry regiments were sent forward to cover the retreat of the Italian 2nd Army and 3rd Army from the Isonzo front. To keep the 3rd Army's path to the Tagliamento river bridges at Codroipo and at Latisana open the II Cavalry Brigade under Brigadier General Emo Capodilista and the infantry Brigade "Bergamo" under Colonel Piero Balbi were sent to Pozzuolo del Friuli and ordered to delay the enemy. The cavalry units arrived in Pozzuolo in the late afternoon of 29 October. A roll call on the morning of 30 October showed that the cavalry brigade consisted of 968 men. By 11h the first enemy vanguards arrived opposite the Italian line and 1 hour later the 4th Squadron of the Regiment "Lancieri di Novara" (5th) charged the flank of the Austro-Hungarian forces, which retreated. Around the same time the Brigade "Bergamo" arrived in Pozzuolo and the commanders of the two brigades decided that the II Battalion of the 25th Infantry Regiment and III Battalion of the 26th Infantry Regiment would defend Pozzuolo, while the "Lancieri di Novara" would cover the left and the "Genova Cavalleria" the right flank of Pozzuolo. The remainder of the Brigade "Bergamo" would continue to Carpeneto and block the road to Codroipo there.

Around 14h three Austro-Hungarian and German divisions attacked the Italian line: the German 5th Infantry Division attacked Carpeneto, while the Austrio-Hungarian 60th Infantry Division attacked Pozzuolo, and the German 117th Infantry Division attacked the "Genova Cavalleria". With the "Genova Cavalleria" under heavy attack the lancers of the Regiment "Lancieri di Novara" (5th) began to harass the left flank of the enemy in repeated cavalry charges. By 17:30 the cavalry brigade had suffered almost 400 dead and the enemy had entered Pozzuolo. Around 18h General Capodilista ordered his troops to disengage and retreat. Colonel Balbi and the "Bergamo" troops chose to stay in Pozzuolo to cover the retreat. Fifteen minutes later the remnants of the II Cavalry Brigade rode in formation south towards Santa Maria di Sclaunicco. The last cavalry unit to leave Pozzuolo was the 4th Squadron of the "Genova Cavalleria", which executed a last suicidal charge against the enemy to cover the other units' escape. During the charge, the 4th Squadron's commanding officer Captain Ettore Laiolo was killed. By nightfall the Regiment "Lancieri di Novara" (5th) had lost 186 men, while the Regiment "Genova Cavalleria" (4th) had lost 281 men. In total the II Cavalry Brigade lost 467 of its 968 men, while the Brigade "Bergamo" lost more than 3,500 men. Ultimately however, the Battle of Pozzuolo was a success as it bought the Italian 3rd Army the time to escape across the Tagliamento river.

On 24 October 1918, the Royal Italian Army began the Battle of Vittorio Veneto and on 29 October the Regiment "Genova Cavalleria" (4th) crossed the Piave river at the island of Grave di Papadopoli. The next day, on 30 October, the regiment, like all cavalry regiments, was ordered to pursue the retreating Austro-Hungarian armies. The regiment advanced to Fiaschetti, where it captured the bridge over the Livenza river.

For its conduct during the Seventh Battle of the Isonzo the Regiment "Genova Cavalleria" (4th) was awarded a Silver Medal of Military Valor, which was affixed to the regiment's standard. Furthermore, for their conduct at Pozzuolo del Friuli the two regiments of the II Cavalry Brigade, "Genova Cavalleria" (4th) and "Lancieri di Novara" (5th), were both awarded a Silver Medal of Military Valor, which were affixed to the two regiments' standards. Moreover, Captain Ettore Laiolo, the commanding officer of the "Genova Cavalleria" regiment's 4th Squadron, and Lieutenant Carlo Castelnuovo delle Lanze, the commanding officer of the regiment's machine gun section, were both awarded posthumously Italy's highest military honor, the Gold Medal of Military Valor for their conduct and sacrifice at Pozzuolo.

=== Interwar years ===
After the war the Royal Italian Army disbanded the second groups of all thirty cavalry regiments, while the first groups were reduced to two squadrons. On 21 November 1919, 14 cavalry regiments were disbanded and their groups transferred to 14 of the remaining cavalry regiments. One of the disbanded regiments was the Regiment "Lancieri di Mantova" (25th), whose remaining group was renamed II Squadrons Group "Lancieri di Mantova". Afterwards, the squadrons group, which remained based in Bologna and retained the disbanded regiment's standard, joined the Regiment "Genova Cavalleria" (4th).

On 20 May 1920, the Royal Italian Army disbanded five additional cavalry regiments, among them the Regiment "Lancieri di Milano" (7th), which ceded one of its remaining squadrons to the Regiment "Genova Cavalleria" (4th). On the same date, the Regiment "Genova Cavalleria" (4th) retired its lances and was renamed Regiment "Genova Cavalleria". On 1 July 1920, the traditions and standard of the Regiment "Lancieri di Mantova" (25th) were entrusted to the Regiment "Genova Cavalleria". On 24 May 1925, the standard of the disbanded Regiment "Lancieri di Mantova" (25th) was transferred to the Shrine of the Flags, which at the time was located in Castel Sant'Angelo, for safekeeping.

In 1926, the regiment moved from Pordenone to Bologna, and in 1933 from Bologna to Rome. On 17 April 1930, the 2nd Fast Division was formed in Bologna. On 15 June 1930 the II Cavalry Brigade, with the regiments Regiment "Genova Cavalleria", Regiment "Cavalleggeri di Aosta", and Regiment "Cavalleggeri Guide" entered the division. On 1 October 1934 the 2nd Artillery Regiment for Cavalry Division was formed and assigned to the division. On 1 January 1935, the division and brigade received the name "Emanuele Filiberto Testa di Ferro". On the same date the brigade was reorganized and the Regiment "Genova Cavalleria" left the division.

=== Second Italo-Ethiopian War ===
In June 1935, in preparation for the Second Italo-Ethiopian War, the regiment formed the I Machine Gunners Squadrons Group "Genova" and II Machine Gunners Squadrons Group "Genova". In August 1935, the two groups, together with the III and IV machine gunners squadrons groups formed by the Regiment "Lancieri di Aosta" (6th), were deployed to Italian Somaliland. The four squadrons groups fielded a combined 126 officers, 239 non-commissioned officers and 5,421 troops. On 3 October 1935, the Italians invaded Ethiopia. In January 1936, after the defeating the Ethiopians in the Battle of Ganale Doria the four squadrons groups rapidly advanced to Neghelli, which was occupied on 20 January. In the following months the squadrons groups participated in the defeat of the Ethiopian forces in the South of the country, and between June and December 1936 the squadrons groups conquered the Galla-Sidamo region. On 1 January 1937, the four groups were given the honor title "Cavalieri di Neghelli" ("Knights of Neghelli"). In late spring 1937, the I and II squadrons groups returned to Italy and were disbanded.

On 7 April 1939 the regiment's II Squadrons Group, together the I and II platoons of the regiment's 5th Machine Gunners Squadron, participated in the Italian invasion of Albania.

=== World War II ===
At the outbreak of World War II the regiment consisted of a command, a command squadron, the 5th Machine Gunners Squadron, and the I and II squadrons groups, which both consisted of two mounted squadrons. The regiment fielded 37 officers, 37 non-commissioned officers, 798 enlisted troops and 818 horses. The regiment was equipped with one car, six motorcycles, 16 trucks, 36 Breda mod. 30 light machine guns, and 12 Fiat mod. 35 heavy machine guns. In April 1941, the regiment was attached to the 3rd Cavalry Division "Principe Amedeo Duca d'Aosta" for the invasion of Yugoslavia. From January to July 1942, the regiment was stationed in Croatia, where it fought Yugoslav partisans.

On 1 August 1942, the regiment joined, together with the Regiment "Nizza Cavalleria" and Regiment "Piemonte Reale Cavalleria", the 2nd Cavalry Division "Emanuele Filiberto Testa di Ferro". On 13 November 1942, the division moved to southern France, which had been occupied by German-Italian forces three days earlier in the operation Case Anton. The division initially garrisoned Nice, before assuming coastal defense duties between Antibes and Saint Tropez. In December the division moved further East and replaced the 58th Infantry Division "Legnano" along the coast from Antibes to Menton.

On 4 September 1943, the division was recalled to Italy in preparation for the announcement of the Armistice of Cassibile and the expected German reaction. In the evening of 8 September 1943, the Armistice of Cassibile, which ended hostilities between the Kingdom of Italy and the Anglo-American Allies, was announced by General Dwight D. Eisenhower on Radio Algiers and by Marshal Pietro Badoglio on Italian radio. Germany reacted by invading Italy. On 9 September, the 2nd Cavalry Division "Emanuele Filiberto Testa di Ferro" blocked German attempts to enter Turin. The next day most of the division moved towards the Val Maira and Val Varaita valleys in an attempt to keep the retreat route for the Italian units in southern France open. On 10 September 1943, the Regiment "Genova Cavalleria" was forced to surrender to overwhelming German forces near Dronero.

During the war the regiment's depot in Rome formed the:

- III Dismounted Group "Genova Cavalleria"
- IV Dismounted Group "Genova Cavalleria"
- IV Machine Gunners Group "Genova Cavalleria"
- X Road Movement Battalion "Genova Cavalleria"
- XIX Dismounted Support Group "Genova Cavalleria"
- XXVII Dismounted Group "Genova Cavalleria"
- XXIX Dismounted Group "Genova Cavalleria"
- XXXIX Machine Gunners Group "Genova Cavalleria"
- LIII Dismounted Group "Genova Cavalleria"
- LIV Dismounted Group "Genova Cavalleria"
- LV Dismounted Group "Genova Cavalleria"

In November 1941, the IV Machine Gunners Group "Genova Cavalleria" was attached to the German Afrika-Division z. b. V. in North Africa, with which it fought in the Western Desert Campaign.

The III Dismounted Group "Genova Cavalleria" and IV Dismounted Group "Genova Cavalleria" were assigned to the Harbor Defense Command Civitavecchia of the 220th Coastal Division, which was responsible for the coastal defense of northern Lazio between the rivers Chiarone and Astura.

The XXVII Dismounted Group "Genova Cavalleria" was sent to the island of Corsica. After the announcement of the Armistice of Cassibile the group fought, together with the 20th Infantry Division "Friuli", 44th Infantry Division "Cremona", 225th Coastal Division, 226th Coastal Division and local resistance units, against the German Sturmbrigade Reichführer-SS and 90th Panzergrenadier Division, which were retreating through Corsica to the harbor of Bastia in the island's north. After the Germans had left Corsica the group was transferred to Sardinia and in August 1944 to Bari in Southern Italy, where it was assigned to the Territorial Command of Bari. In January 1945, the XXVII Group "Genova Cavalleria" was attached to the British Eighth Army's 56th Area Command in Siena. In May 1945 the group took part in the liberation of Milan.

After the announcement of the Armistice of Cassibile, the regiment's depot in Rome organized an ad hoc battle group under command of Captain Franco Vannetti Donnini, which, together with troops from the 12th Infantry Division "Sassari", 21st Infantry Division "Granatieri di Sardegna", 135th Armored Cavalry Division "Ariete", and Regiment "Lancieri di Montebello" defended Rome against German forces. On 10 September the Italian troops and hundreds of civilian volunteers were forced to fall back to Porta San Paolo for a last stand. By 17:00 the Germans broke the line of the Italian defenders, who had suffered 570 dead, including Captain Vannetti Donnini, who was posthumously awarded Italy's highest military honor the Gold Medal of Military Valor. Soon afterwards the remaining units surrendered to the Germans as the flight of the Italian King Victor Emmanuel III from Rome made further resistance senseless.

=== Cold War ===
On 10 September 1946, the Italian Army decided to form five divisional reconnaissance groups, among them the 4th Dragoons Reconnaissance Group (Italian: Gruppo Esplorante 4° Dragoni), which received the traditions and yellow gorget patches of the Regiment "Genova Cavalleria" (4th). On 20 November 1946, the group became operational in Albenga. In 1947 the group moved from Albenga to Palmanova, where it joined the Infantry Division "Mantova". On 1 February 1949, the group was expanded to 4th Armored Cavalry Regiment "Genova Cavalleria". The regiment, which upon its formation received the standard of Regiment "Genova Cavalleria" (4th), consisted of a command, a command squadron, and three squadrons groups with M26 Pershing tanks. The same year the regiment provided a mixed squadron for the security corps of the Trust Territory of Somaliland, which was under Italian administration. The deployment of the squadron lasted until 1951 and it consisted of a command platoon, two armored car platoons with Staghound T17, and a tank platoon with Stuart M3A3 tanks. On 1 April 1957, the regiment was assigned, together with the 2nd Armored Cavalry Regiment "Piemonte Cavalleria", 5th Armored Cavalry Regiment "Lancieri di Novara" and 8th Self-propelled Field Artillery Regiment, to the newly formed Cavalry Brigade. On 4 November 1958, the 4th Armored Cavalry Regiment "Genova Cavalleria" was renamed Regiment "Genova Cavalleria" (4th), while on 1 January 1959, the Cavalry Brigade was renamed Cavalry Brigade "Pozzuolo del Friuli".

During the 1975 army reform the army disbanded the regimental level and newly independent battalions were granted for the first time their own flags, respectively in the case of cavalry units, their own standard. On 30 September 1975, the Regiment "Genova Cavalleria" (4th) and the regiment's III Squadrons Group were disbanded. The next day, on 1 October 1975, the regiment's I Squadrons Group was reorganized and renamed 4th Mechanized Squadrons Group "Genova Cavalleria", while the regiment's II Squadrons Group was reorganized and renamed 28th Tank Squadrons Group "Cavalleggeri di Treviso". Both squadrons groups were assigned to the Armored Brigade "Pozzuolo del Friuli", which also included the 5th Tank Squadrons Group "Lancieri di Novara", 120th Self-propelled Field Artillery Group "Po", and Logistic Battalion "Pozzuolo del Friuli". The 4th Mechanized Squadrons Group "Genova Cavalleria" consisted of a command, a command and services squadron, three mechanized squadrons with M113 armored personnel carriers, and a heavy mortar squadron with M106 mortar carriers with 120mm mod. 63 mortars. At the time the squadrons group fielded 896 men (45 officers, 100 non-commissioned officers, and 751 soldiers).

On 12 November 1976, the President of the Italian Republic Giovanni Leone assigned with decree 846 the standard and traditions of the Regiment "Genova Cavalleria" (4th) to the 4th Mechanized Squadrons Group "Genova Cavalleria".

For its conduct and work after the 1976 Friuli earthquake the squadrons group was awarded a Bronze Medal of Army Valor, which was affixed to the squadrons group's standard and added to its coat of arms.

=== Recent times ===
On 13 September 1993, the 4th Mechanized Squadrons Group "Genova Cavalleria" lost its autonomy and the next day the squadrons group entered the Regiment "Genova Cavalleria" (4th). On the same day, the standard and traditions of the Regiment "Genova Cavalleria" (4th) were transferred from the squadrons group to the regiment. The regiment consisted of a command, a command and services squadron, and a squadrons group with three armored squadrons equipped with wheeled Centauro tank destroyers. In 1993, the regiment deployed a Centauro platoon to Somalia for the United Nations Operation in Somalia II.

== Organization ==
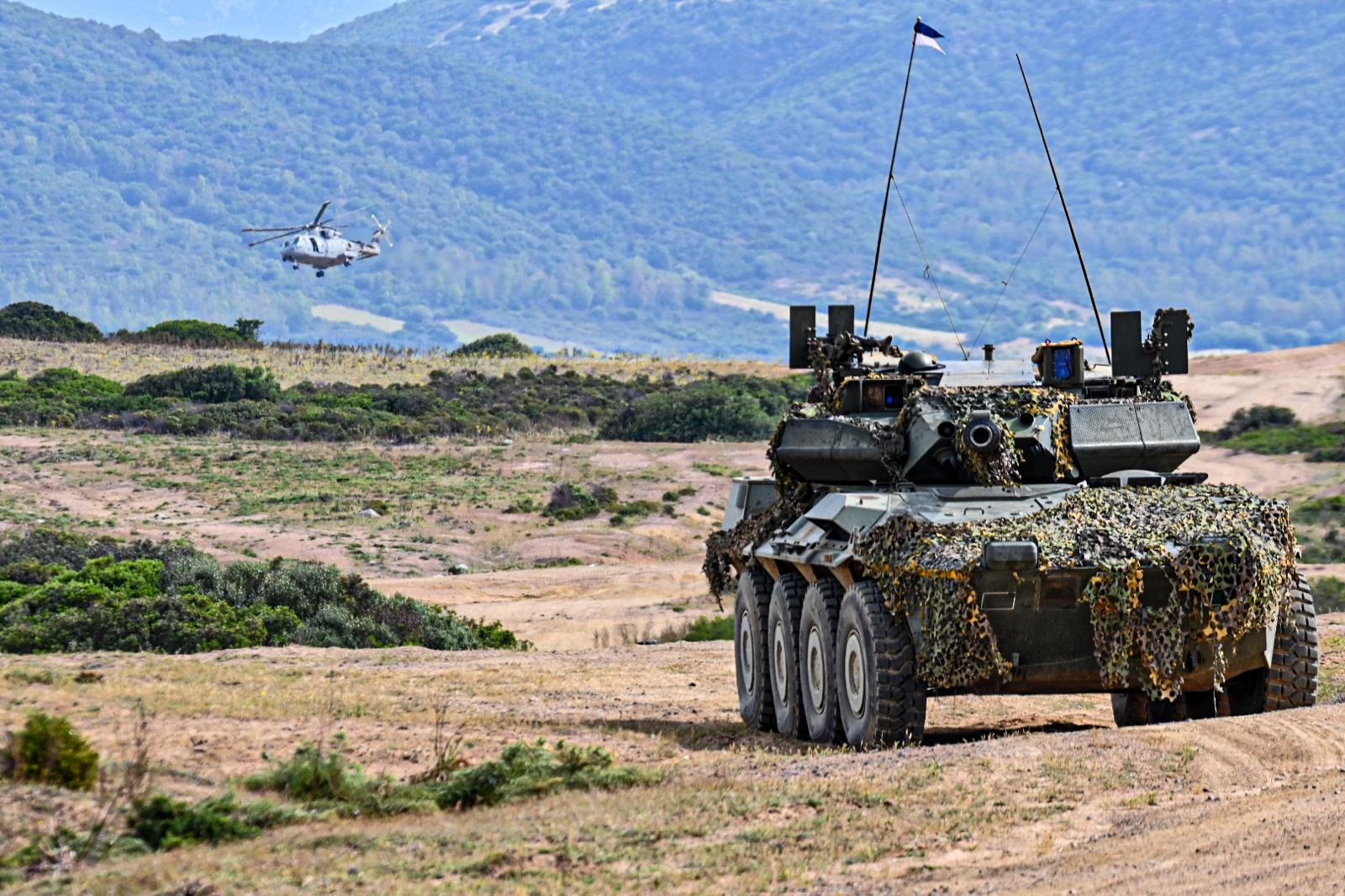
Regiment "Genova Cavalleria" (4th) Centauro tank destroyer and an Italian Navy UH-101 Merlin helicopter during exercise Mare Aperto 24/1 in Capo Teulada

As of 2025 the Regiment "Genova Cavalleria" (4th) is organized as follows:

- Regiment "Genova Cavalleria" (4th), in Palmanova
  - Command and Logistic Support Squadron
  - 1st Reconnaissance Squadrons Group
    - 1st Reconnaissance Squadron
    - 2nd Reconnaissance Squadron
    - 3rd Reconnaissance Squadron
    - Heavy Armored Squadron

The three reconnaissance squadrons are equipped with Lince vehicles and Centauro tank destroyers, which are scheduled to be replaced by Lince 2 vehicles and Freccia EVO Reconnaissance vehicles. The Heavy Armored Squadron is equipped with Centauro tank destroyers, which are being replaced by Centauro 2 tank destroyers.

== See also ==
- Cavalry Brigade "Pozzuolo del Friuli"
