= Battle of Pozzuolo =

1917 battle at Pozzuolo del Friuli, Italy

Battle of Pozzuolo del Friuli
- Part of Italian Front (World War I)
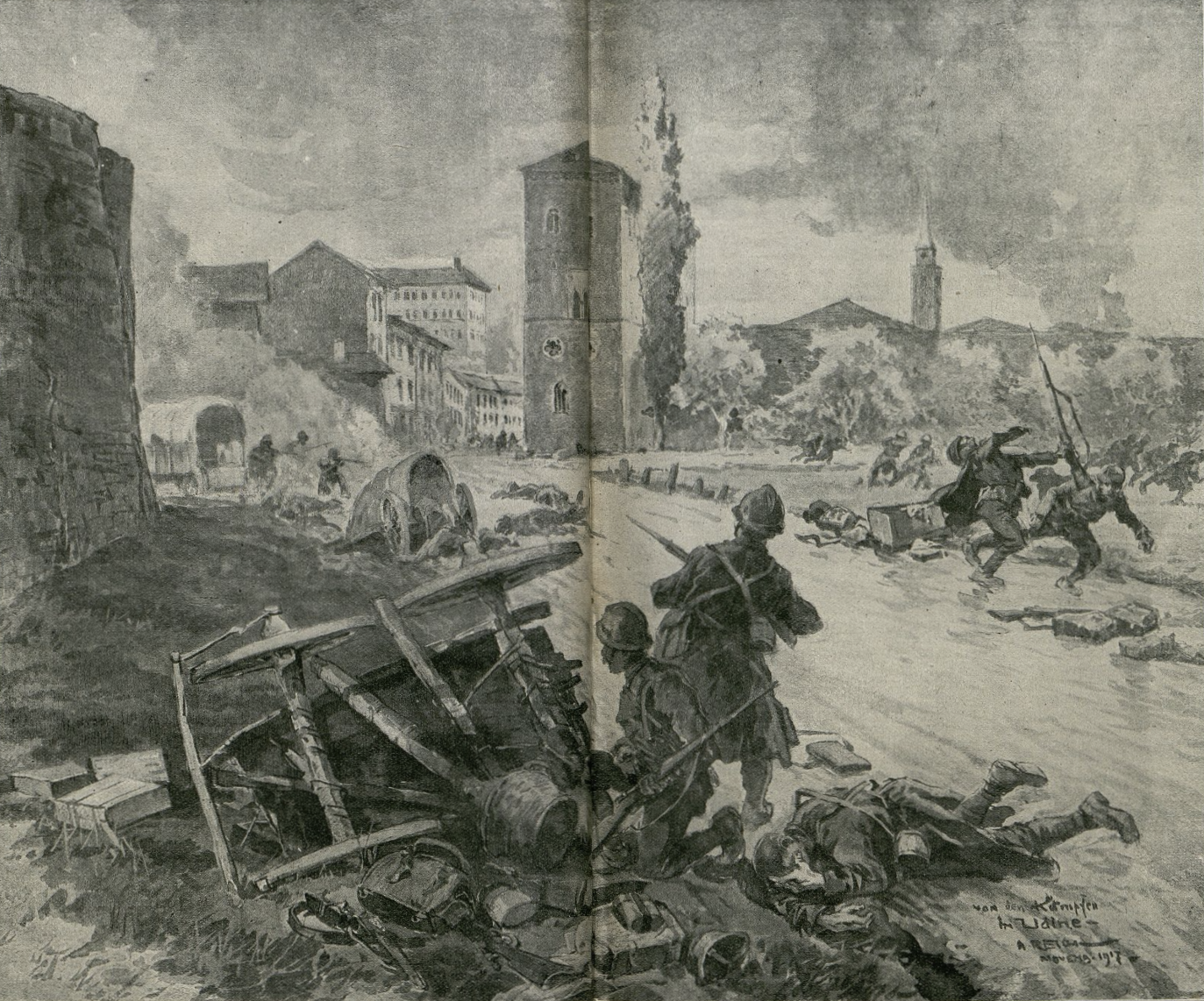
Date	30 October 1917
Location	Pozzuolo del Friuli
Result	Italian victory

Belligerents
Italy	Austria-Hungary; Germany

Commanders and leaders
(Kingdom of Italy) Giorgio Emo di Capodilista	(Austria-Hungary) Svetozar Boroević

Strength
1 cavalry brigade 1 infantry brigade	1 division Austrian Kaiserschützen; 2 German Army divisions

The Battle of Pozzuolo del Friuli was fought during World War I on 30 October 1917, between the Italian II Cavalry Brigade and two infantry battalions of the Brigade "Bergamo", against two divisions of the German Imperial Army and one division of the Austro-Hungarian Army at Pozzuolo del Friuli.

== Prelude ==
On 24 October 1917, Austro-Hungarian forces, reinforced by German units, commenced the Battle of Caporetto. The German forces were able to break into the Italian front line at Caporetto and rout the Italian forces opposing them. The breakthrough forced the Italian 3rd Army to retreat westwards behind the Piave river. However, due to the rapid advance of the Austro-Hungarian and German forces towards the Venetian Plain, the 3rd Army's line of retreat was in danger of being cut off and encircled. Therefore, the II Cavalry Brigade under Brigadier General Emo Capodilista and the Brigade "Bergamo", under Colonel Piero Balbi were sent to Pozzuolo del Friuli and ordered to delay the enemy long enough for the 3rd Army to escape across the Tagliamento river over the bridges at Codroipo and at Latisana. The II Cavalry Brigade consisted of the Regiment "Genova Cavalleria" (4th) and Regiment "Lancieri di Novara" (5th).

== Battle ==
The cavalry units arrived in Pozzuolo del Friuli in the late afternoon of 29 October, while the "Bergamo" units arrived after a forced march at noon on 30 October 1917. The two commanders decided that the II Battalion of the 25th Infantry Regiment and III Battalion of the 26th Infantry Regiment would defend Pozzuolo, while the "Lancieri di Novara" would cover the left and the "Genova Cavalleria" the right flank of Pozzuolo. The remainder of the Brigade "Bergamo" would continue to Carpeneto and block the road to Codroipo there. A roll call on the morning of the 30 October showed that the cavalry brigade consisted of only 968 men.

All morning patrols of the cavalry regiments had encountered advance parties of the German 117th Infantry Division. By 14:00 the Italians were under attack by three enemy divisions: the German 5th Infantry Division attacked Carpeneto, while the Austro-Hungarian 60th Infantry Division attacked Pozzuolo, and the German 117th Infantry Division attacked the "Genova Cavalleria". With the "Genova Cavalleria" under heavy attack the lancers of the "Lancieri di Novara" began to harass the left flank of the enemy in repeated cavalry charges.

By 17:30 the cavalry brigade had suffered almost 400 dead and the enemy had entered the village of Pozzuolo. Around 18h General Capodilista ordered his troops to disengage and retreat. Colonel Balbi and the "Bergamo" troops remained in Pozzuolo to cover the retreat. Fifteen minutes later the remnants of the II Cavalry Brigade rode in formation south towards Santa Maria di Sclaunicco. The last unit to leave Pozzuolo was the 4th Squadron of the "Genova Cavalleria", which executed a last suicidal charge against the enemy to cover the other units' escape. By nightfall the brigade had lost 467 of its 968 men, while the "Bergamo" units were completely destroyed.

After the battle the standards of the two cavalry regiments were awarded a Silver Medal of Military Valour, while the brigade's commander general Emo Capodilista was promoted to major general and awarded the Military Order of Savoy. In total 176 medals and awards were given to the men of the "Bergamo" and the cavalry brigade, among those two Gold Medals of Military Valour in memoriam: one to the commander of the Machine Gunners Squadron of the "Genova Cavalleria" Lieutenant Carlo Castelnuovo delle Lanze, and the other to the commander of the 4th Squadron of the "Genova Cavalleria" Captain Ettore Laiolo, who had perished in his squadron's suicidal last charge.

== Aftermath ==
The Italian victory at the Battle of Pozzuolo del Friuli gave the 3rd Army enough time to cross the Tagliamento river. After the army had retreated behind the Piave river the II Cavalry Brigade was brought back to full strength and fought in 1918 in the final battles of the war on the Italian front: the Battle of the Piave River in June 1918 and the Battle of Vittorio Veneto in October 1918.

== See also ==
- Cavalry Brigade "Pozzuolo del Friuli"
