= Regiment "Cavalleggeri di Treviso" (28th) =

Active Italian Army cavalry unit

- Reggimento "Cavalleggeri di Treviso" (28°)
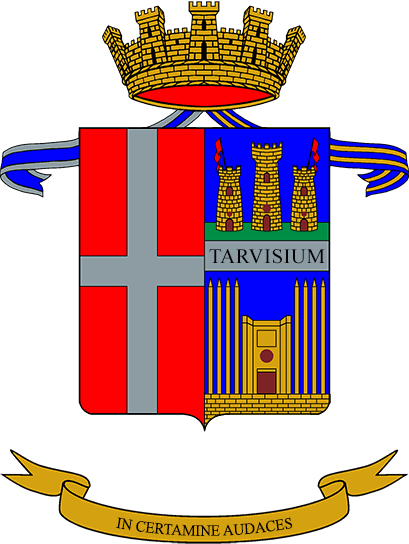
- Regimental coat of arms
- Active: 1 Oct. 1909 — 21 Nov. 1919; 1 Oct. 1975 — 31 March 1991; 1 Oct. 2022 — today
- Country: Italy
- Branch: Italian Army
- Part of: Cavalry Brigade "Pozzuolo del Friuli"
- Garrison/HQ: Gorizia
- Motto: "In certamine audaces"
- Anniversaries: 15 May 1916 - Battle of Monfalcone
- Decorations: 1× Silver Medal of Military Valor; 1× Bronze Medal of Army Valor

Insignia
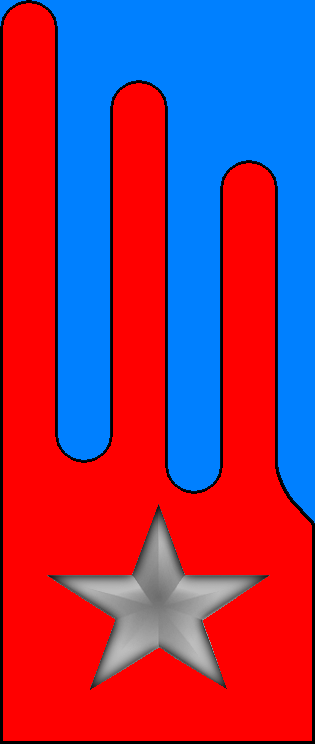
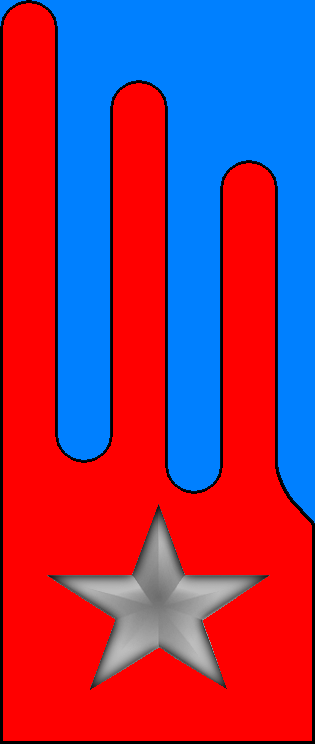
- Regimental gorget patches

The Regiment "Cavalleggeri di Treviso" (28th) (Italian: Reggimento "Cavalleggeri di Treviso" (28°) - "Chevau-légers of Treviso") is a cavalry unit of the Italian Army named for the city of Treviso in Veneto. In 1909, the Royal Italian Army formed the regiment, which served during World War I on the Italian front. For its conduct in the Battle of Monfalcone in May 1916 the regiment was awarded a Silver Medal of Military Valor. After the end of World War I, the regiment was disbanded and its traditions assigned to the Regiment "Cavalleggeri di Alessandria".

In 1975, the regiment's name, standard, and traditions were assigned to the 28th Tank Squadrons Group "Cavalleggeri di Treviso", which was assigned to the Armored Brigade "Pozzuolo del Friuli". After the end of the Cold War, the 8th Tank Squadrons Group "Cavalleggeri di Treviso" was disbanded in 1991. On 1 October 2022, the regiment's name, standard and traditions were assigned to the Command and Tactical Supports Unit "Pozzuolo del Friuli" of the Cavalry Brigade "Pozzuolo del Friuli". The regiment's anniversary falls on 15 May 1916, the second day of the Austro-Hungarian Army's attack towards Monfalcone, during which the Regiment "Cavalleggeri di Treviso" (28th) distinguished itself, for which the regiment was awarded a Silver Medal of Military Valor. As the regiment is a Chevau-léger unit, its enlisted personnel is addressed as "Chevau-léger" (Italian: Cavalleggero).

== History ==
=== Formation ===
On 1 October 1909, the Royal Italian Army formed the Regiment "Cavalleggeri di Treviso" (28th) in Florence with the third squadrons of five existing Chevau-léger regiments. The new regiment was organized as follows:

- Regiment "Cavalleggeri di Treviso" (28th), in Florence
  - 1st Squadron — former 3rd Squadron/ Regiment "Cavalleggeri di Saluzzo" (12th)
  - 2nd Squadron — former 3rd Squadron/ Regiment "Cavalleggeri di Alessandria" (14th)
  - 3rd Squadron — former 3rd Squadron/ Regiment "Cavalleggeri di Lucca" (16th)
  - 4th Squadron — former 3rd Squadron/ Regiment "Cavalleggeri di Caserta" (17th)
  - 5th Squadron — former 3rd Squadron/ Regiment "Cavalleggeri di Catania" (22nd)
  - Regimental depot

In 1911–12, the regiment provided seven officers and 295 enlisted to units deployed for the Italo-Turkish War.

=== World War I ===
At the outbreak of World War I the regiment consisted of a command, a depot, and two cavalry groups, with the I Group consisting of three squadrons and the II Group consisting of two squadrons and a machine gun section. Together with the Regiment "Cavalleggeri Guide" (19th) the regiment formed the VIII Cavalry Brigade, which was assigned to the 4th Cavalry Division "Piemonte". In April 1916, the division was dismounted for service in the trenches of the Italian front. After being dismounted the regiment was reinforced by the dismounted 1st Squadron of the Regiment "Cavalleggeri di Lucca" (16th). On 11 May 1916, the 4th Cavalry Division "Piemonte" entered the trenches at Monfalcone below the Karst plateau. In the night from 14 to 15 May 1916, just before the start of the Austro-Hungarian Asiago offensive, the Austro-Hungarian Army launched a surprise diversionary attack on the Italian positions at Monfalcone. The Austro-Hungarian attack drove the Italian cavalry troops off the important Height 93, which the VIII Cavalry Brigade, supported by the 15th Bersaglieri Regiment and the XI Cyclists Battalion of the 11th Bersaglieri Regiment, retook the following day. The next day, on May 16, the Italian units pushed the Austro-Hungarian troops back to their starting lines.

On 28 June 1916, the Italian forces launched an attack on the Austro-Hungarian positions on the flanks of the Karst plateau, during which the Regiment "Cavalleggeri di Treviso" (28th) operated at Selz to the North of Monfalcone. In late July 1916, the 1st Cavalry Division "Friuli" and 4th Cavalry Division "Piemonte" switched places on the front, with the 1st Cavalry Division "Friuli" entering the trenches at Monfalcone below the Karst plateau, while the 4th Cavalry Division "Piemonte" entered the trenches at Plave in the center of the Isonzo front. On 28 December 1916, the Regiment "Cavalleggeri di Treviso" (28th) was awarded a Silver Medal of Military Valor for its conduct at Monfalcone in May and at Selz in June.

In 1917, the regiment's depot in Florence formed the 734th Dismounted Machine Gunners Company as reinforcement for the regiment. In 1918, the regiment fought in the decisive Battle of Vittorio Veneto.

=== Interwar years ===
After the war the Royal Italian Army disbanded the second groups of all thirty cavalry regiments, while the first groups were reduced to two squadrons. On 21 November 1919, 14 cavalry regiments were disbanded and their groups transferred to 14 of the remaining cavalry regiments. One of the disbanded regiments was the Regiment "Cavalleggeri di Treviso" (28th), whose group was renamed II Squadrons Group "Cavalleggeri di Treviso". Afterwards, the squadrons group, which remained based in Florence and retained the disbanded regiment's standard, was assigned to the Regiment "Cavalleggeri di Alessandria" (14th) in Lucca.

On 20 May 1920, the Royal Italian Army disbanded five additional cavalry regiments, among them the Regiment "Cavalleggeri di Lodi" (15th), whose 3rd Squadron of the II Squadrons Group "Cavalleggeri di Udine" was transferred to the Regiment "Cavalleggeri di Alessandria" (14th). On 1 July 1920, the II Squadrons Group "Cavalleggeri di Treviso" and one its squadrons were disbanded. On the same day, the traditions and standard of the Regiment "Cavalleggeri di Treviso" (28th) were entrusted to the Regiment "Cavalleggeri di Alessandria", which moved from Lucca to Florence and took over the barracks of the disbanded II Squadrons Group "Cavalleggeri di Treviso". On 24 May 1925, the standard of the Regiment "Cavalleggeri di Treviso" (28th) was transferred to the Shrine of the Flags, which at the time was located in Castel Sant'Angelo, for safekeeping.

=== Cold War ===
During the 1975 army reform the army disbanded the regimental level and newly independent battalions were granted for the first time their own flags, respectively in the case of cavalry units, their own standard. On 30 September 1975, the Regiment "Genova Cavalleria" (4th) was disbanded and the next day, on 1 October 1975, the regiment's II Squadrons Group in Palmanova became an autonomous unit and was renamed 28th Tank Squadrons Group "Cavalleggeri di Treviso". The squadrons group was assigned to the Armored Brigade "Pozzuolo del Friuli" and consisted of a command, a command and services squadron, and three tank squadrons equipped with Leopard 1A2 main battle tanks. At the time the squadrons group fielded 434 men (32 officers, 82 non-commissioned officers, and 320 soldiers).

On 12 November 1976, the President of the Italian Republic Giovanni Leone assigned with decree 846 the standard and traditions of the Regiment "Cavalleggeri di Treviso" (28th) to the squadrons group.

For its conduct and work after the 1976 Friuli earthquake the squadrons group was awarded a Bronze Medal of Army Valor, which was affixed to the squadrons group's standard and added to its coat of arms.

After the end of the Cold War the Italian Army began to draw down its forces and the Cavalleggeri di Treviso were one of the first units to disband. On 31 March 1991, the squadrons group was disbanded and, on 8 May 1991, the standard of the Regiment "Cavalleggeri di Treviso" (28th) was transferred to the Shrine of the Flags in the Vittoriano in Rome for safekeeping.

=== Reactivation ===
On 1 October 2022, the name, standard and traditions of the Regiment "Cavalleggeri di Treviso" (28th) were assigned to the Command and Tactical Supports Unit "Pozzuolo del Friuli" of the Cavalry Brigade "Pozzuolo del Friuli". On the same date the unit was renamed Command and Tactical Supports Unit "Cavalleggeri di Treviso" (28th).

== Organization ==
As of 2024 the Command and Tactical Supports Unit "Cavalleggeri di Treviso" (28th) is organized as follows:

- Command and Tactical Supports Unit "Cavalleggeri di Treviso" (28th), in Gorizia
  - Command and Logistic Support Squadron
  - Signal Company

== See also ==
- Armored Brigade "Pozzuolo del Friuli"
