= Logistic Battalion "Pozzuolo del Friuli" =

Inactive Italian Army brigade logistics unit

- Battaglione Logistico "Pozzuolo del Friuli"
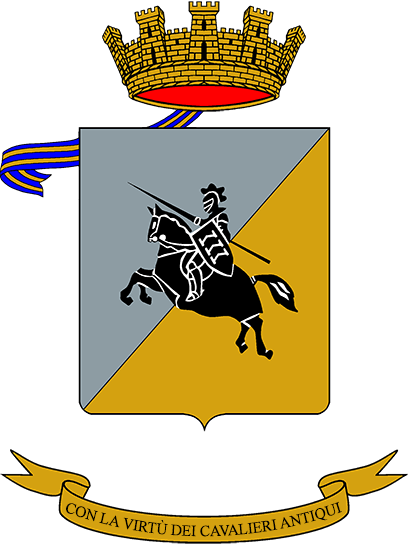
- Battalion coat of arms
- Active: 1 Nov. 1975 — 1 Feb. 2002
- Country: Italy
- Branch: Italian Army
- Type: Military logistics
- Part of: Cavalry Brigade "Pozzuolo del Friuli"
- Garrison/HQ: Visco
- Motto(s): "Con la virtù dei cavalieri antiqui"
- Anniversaries: 22 May 1916 - Battle of Asiago
- Decorations: 1× Bronze Medal of Army Valor

Insignia
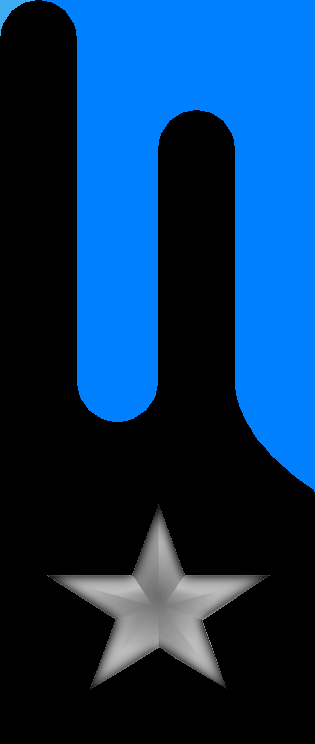
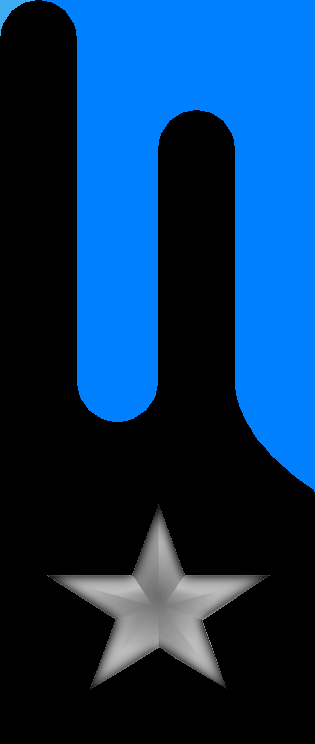
- Unit gorget patches

The Logistic Battalion "Pozzuolo del Friuli" (Italian: Battaglione Logistico "Pozzuolo del Friuli") is an inactive military logistics battalion of the Italian Army, which was assigned to the Cavalry Brigade "Pozzuolo del Friuli". The battalion's anniversary falls, as for all units of the Italian Army's Transport and Materiel Corps, on 22 May, the anniversary of the Royal Italian Army's first major use of automobiles to transport reinforcements to the Asiago plateau to counter the Austro-Hungarian Asiago Offensive in May 1916.

== History ==
The battalion is the spiritual successor of the logistic units of the Royal Italian Army's cavalry divisions, which participated in October 1918 in the Battle of Vittorio Veneto:

- 1st Cavalry Division "Friuli"
- 2nd Cavalry Division "Veneto"
- 3rd Cavalry Division "Lombardia"
- 4th Cavalry Division "Piemonte"

=== Cold War ===
On 1 October 1975, as part of the 1975 army reform, the Cavalry Brigade "Pozzuolo del Friuli" was split into the Armored Brigade "Pozzuolo del Friuli" and Armored Brigade "Vittorio Veneto". On 1 November 1975, the Logistic Battalion "Pozzuolo del Friuli" was formed in Visco and assigned to the brigade. The battalion consisted of a command, command platoon, a supply and transport company, a medium workshop, and a vehicle park. At the time the battalion fielded 692 men (38 officers, 85 non-commissioned officers, and 569 soldiers).

On 12 November 1976, the President of the Italian Republic Giovanni Leone granted with decree 846 the battalion a flag.

For its conduct and work after the 1976 Friuli earthquake the battalion was awarded a Bronze Medal of Army Valor, which was affixed to the battalion's flag and added to the battalion's coat of arms.

In 1981, the battalion added a reserve medical unit. On 1 December 1981, the battalion was reorganized and consisted then of the following units:

- Logistic Battalion "Pozzuolo del Friuli", in Visco
  - Command and Services Company
  - Supply Company
  - Maintenance Company
  - Medium Transport Company
  - Medical Unit (Reserve)

=== Recent times ===
On 1 February 2002, the Logistic Battalion "Pozzuolo del Friuli" was disbanded and the battalion's flag was transferred to the Shrine of the Flags in the Vittoriano in Rome for safekeeping.

== See also ==
- Military logistics
