= 117th Infantry Division (German Empire) =

- 117. Infanterie-Division
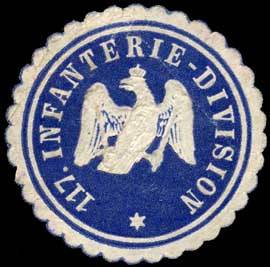
- Active: 2 April 1915 – 1919
- Country: German Empire
- Branch: Army
- Type: Infantry
- Size: Approx. 12,500
- Engagements: World War I: Second Battle of Artois; Battle of Loos; Battle of the Somme; Battle of Caporetto; German spring offensive; Battle of the Lys; Meuse-Argonne Offensive

The 117th Infantry Division (117. Infanterie-Division) was a formation of the Imperial German Army in World War I. The division was formed on April 2, 1915, and organized over the next several weeks. It was part of a wave of new infantry divisions formed in the spring of 1915. The division was disbanded in 1919, during the demobilization of the German Army after World War I.

The division was formed primarily from the excess infantry regiments of regular infantry divisions that were being triangularized. The division's 233rd Infantry Brigade staff had been the staff of the 23rd Reserve Infantry Brigade of the 12th Reserve Division, which came to the new division along with the 22nd Reserve Infantry Regiment. The 11th Reserve Infantry Regiment had been part of the 11th Reserve Division. The 157th Infantry Regiment came from the 12th Infantry Division. The division was recruited in Silesia.

== Combat chronicle ==
The 117th Infantry Division began fighting on the Western Front in World War I, entering the line in the Champagne region. It then fought in the Second Battle of Artois and the Autumn Battle by La Bassée and Arras, which included the Battle of Loos. It remained in the trenches in Flanders and the Artois until February 1916, and then was in the line on the Yser until July. It then fought in the Battle of the Somme. In August 1916, the division was transferred to the Eastern Front, arriving in Carpathia later in the month. It faced the Russians in Carpathia until late 1917, when it went into combat against the Romanians. In October 1917, the division was transferred to Italy, and went into the line on the Isonzo Front. It fought in the Battle of Caporetto, the Battle of Pozzuolo, and the follow-on offensive to the Piave River. The division remained in Italy until March 1918, when it returned to the Western Front. It fought in the Battle of the Lys, also known at the Fourth Battle of Ypres. It remained in the line, and fought against several Allied offensives, including the Meuse-Argonne Offensive. It was facing the Allies between the Meuse and Beaumont when the Armistice came into effect. Allied intelligence rated the division as second class.

== Order of battle on formation ==
The order of battle of the 117th Infantry Division on April 5, 1915, was as follows:

- 233. Infanterie-Brigade
  - Reserve-Infanterie-Regiment Nr. 11
  - Reserve-Infanterie-Regiment Nr. 22
  - 4. Schlesisches Infanterie-Regiment Nr. 157
- 1.Eskadron/Kürassier-Regiment Graf Geßler (Rheinisches) Nr. 8
- 2.Eskadron/Kürassier-Regiment Graf Geßler (Rheinisches) Nr. 8
- Feldartillerie-Regiment Nr. 233
- Fußartillerie-Batterie Nr. 117
- Pionier-Kompanie Nr. 233

== Late-war order of battle ==
The division underwent relatively few organizational changes over the course of the war. Cavalry was reduced, artillery and signals commands were formed, and combat engineer support was expanded to a full pioneer battalion. The order of battle on May 16, 1918, was as follows:

- 233. Infanterie-Brigade
  - Reserve-Infanterie-Regiment Nr. 11
  - Reserve-Infanterie-Regiment Nr. 22
  - 4. Schlesisches Infanterie-Regiment Nr. 157
- 1.Eskadron/Kürassier-Regiment Graf Geßler (Rheinisches) Nr. 8
- Artillerie-Kommandeur 117
  - Feldartillerie-Regiment Nr. 233
  - Fußartillerie-Bataillon Nr. 88
- Pionier-Bataillon Nr. 117
  - Pionier-Kompanie Nr. 233
  - Pionier-Kompanie Nr. 263
  - Minenwerfer-Kompanie Nr. 117
- Divisions-Nachrichten-Kommandeur 117
