= Cavalry Brigade "Pozzuolo del Friuli" =

Brigade of the Italian Army

- Brigata di Cavalleria "Pozzuolo del Friuli"
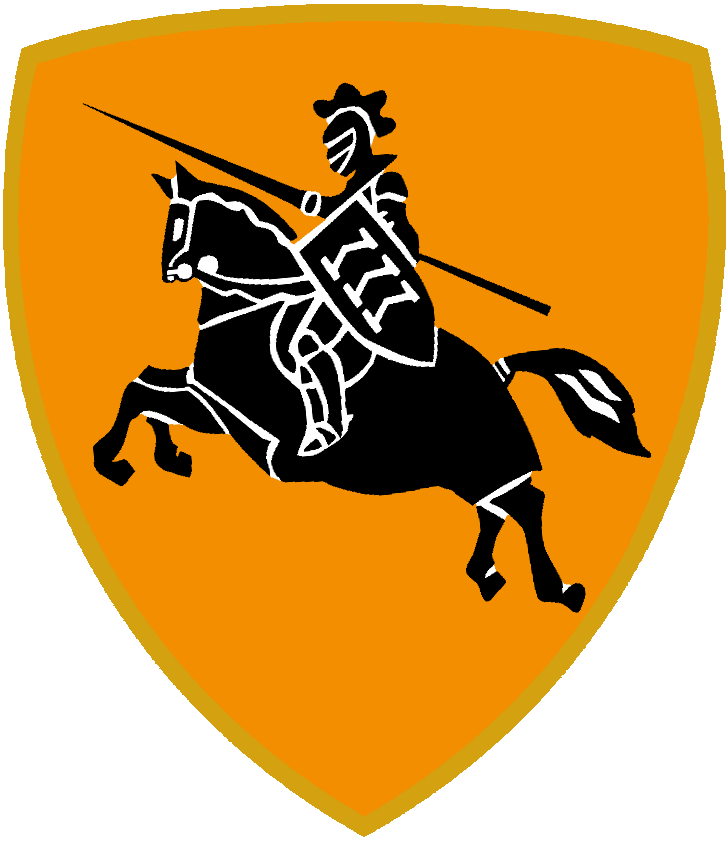
- Coat of arms of the Cavalry Brigade "Pozzuolo del Friuli"
- Founded: 1835
- Country: Italy
- Branch: Italian Army
- Role: Cavalry
- Size: Brigade
- Part of: Multinational Division South
- Garrison/HQ: Gorizia, Italy
- Engagements: World War I; World War II; Yugoslav Wars; Bosnian War; SFOR; Kosovo War; KFOR; War in Afghanistan; ISAF; Iraq War; Multinational force in Iraq

Commanders
- Current commander: Brigadier Ugo Cillo, EI (79th commanding officer)
- Notable commanders: General Emo Capodilista, EI

The Cavalry Brigade "Pozzuolo del Friuli" is a brigade of the Italian Army, based in the Friuli-Venezia Giulia and Veneto regions. The Brigade consists of a command unit, a cavalry regiment, an amphibious infantry regiment, an artillery regiment, an engineer regiment and a logistic regiment. The brigade is part of the Multinational Division South.

== History ==
=== Constitution ===
The origins of the Cavalry Brigade "Pozzuolo del Friuli" date back to the Kingdom of Sardinia, where on 7 March 1835 the Cuirassier regiments "Piemonte Reale" and "Genova Cavalleria", and the lancers regiment "Lancieri di Aosta" were combined to form the II Cavalry Brigade. On 4 October 1836 the "Genova" and "Aosta" were replaced by the lancer regiment "Lancieri di Novara".

=== First Italian War of Independence ===
During the First Italian War of Independence the brigade's two regiment were attached to infantry divisions and fought at the battles of Pastrengo, Santa Lucia, Volta Mantovana, Mortara, Sforzesca, and Novara. After the conclusion of the war with the Armistice of Vignale on 24 March 1849 the brigade received the returning Cuirassier regiments "Savoia Cavalleria" and "Genova Cavalleria" on 2 April 1849. With the war over the brigade was disbanded on 10 November 1849.

=== Second Italian War of Independence ===
The brigade was quickly raised again on the eve of the Second Italian War of Independence in 1859 as II Cuirassier Brigade and consisted of the cuirassier regiments "Savoia Cavalleria" and "Genova Cavalleria". Together with the I Cuirassier Brigade with the regiments "Nizza Cavalleria" and "Piemonte Reale Cavalleria" the brigade formed the army's cavalry division. The brigade fought in the battles of Palestro and Vinzaglio. After the war the brigade was garrisoned in Milan with its regiments in Turin and Vigevano. In 1863 the brigade was once more disbanded.

=== Third Italian War of Independence ===
However, again on the eve of war, this time the Third Italian War of Independence in 1866, the brigade was once more activated with the cuirassier regiments "Savoia Cavalleria" and "Genova Cavalleria" and formed once again with the I Cuirassier Brigade, with the regiments "Nizza Cavalleria" and "Piemonte Reale Cavalleria" the army's sole cavalry division. After the war the fate of the brigade was in balance once more until the government issued a decree on 4 December 1870 to establish permanent cavalry brigades.

=== World War I ===
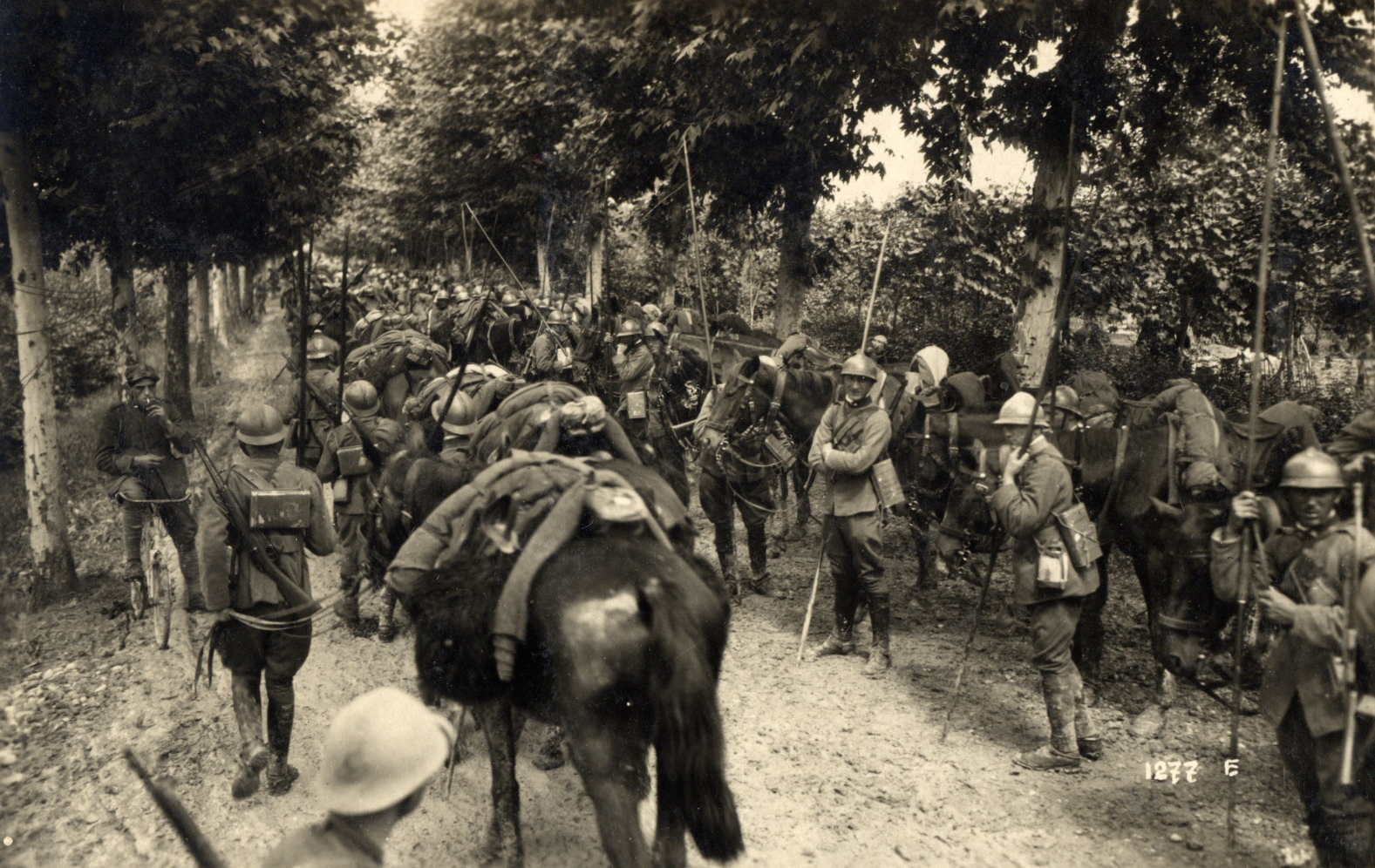
Italian lancers during World War 1

At the outbreak of World War I the II Cavalry Brigade consisted of the Regiment "Genova Cavalleria" (4th) and the Regiment "Lancieri di Novara" (5th). The brigade was part of the 1st Cavalry Division "Friuli" and based in the region of Friuli. The brigade was the first Italian unit to cross the border with Austria-Hungary on 24 May 1915, when its regiments advanced to the take the bridges over the Isonzo river at Pieris. From May 1916 onward the brigade served as line infantry on the Italian Front. During the Seventh Battle of the Isonzo the brigade conquered Height 144 overlooking Doberdò and held it against repeated Austrian counterattacks. In December 1916 the brigade was taken out of the front and mounted again on horses.

==== Battle of Pozzuolo del Friuli ====
In 1917 the brigade covered the flight of the remnants of the Italian 3rd Army after the disastrous Battle of Caporetto. With Central Power troops advancing rapidly towards the Venetian Plain the 3rd Army was in danger of being encircled. Therefore, the II Cavalry Brigade under Brigadier General Emo Capodilista, and the II/25th Battalion and III/26th Battalion of the Infantry Brigade "Bergamo" under Colonel Piero Balbi were sent to Pozzuolo del Friuli and ordered to delay the enemy long enough for the 3rd Army to escape over the bridges at Codroipo and at Latisana across the Tagliamento river.

The II Cavalry Brigade and the two Bergamo battalions successfully delayed the Austro-German advance long enough for the 3rd Army to escape across the Tagliamento river. After the army had retreated behind the Piave river the II Cavalry Brigade was brought back to full strength and fought in 1918 in the final battles of the war on the Italian front: the Battle of the Piave River in June 1918 and the Battle of Vittorio Veneto in October 1918.

=== World War II ===
In 1926 the brigade was renamed as II Higher Cavalry Command and commanded four Lancer regiments: "Cavalleggeri di Novara" (5th), "Cavalleggeri di Aosta" (6th), "Cavalleggeri di Firenze" (9th) and "Cavalleggeri Vittorio Emanuele II" (10th). In June 1930 the three Higher Cavalry Commands changed names to Cavalry Brigades. In 1935 the II Cavalry Brigade was motorized and became the II Fast Brigade, which was later changed to II Fast Brigade "Emanuele Filiberto Testa di Ferro". On 1 February 1938 the brigade was elevated to division and became the 2nd Fast Division "Emanuele Filiberto Testa di Ferro".

The division participated in the Axis Invasion of Yugoslavia and remained afterwards in occupied Yugoslavia as garrison unit. In May 1942, the division was selected to convert to an armored division and started converting to the 134th Armored Division "Freccia". However, the conversion was cancelled and it returned to the Cavalry division format. In December 1942, the division moved to France as part of the Italian occupation forces and was based in Toulon. The division remained in France until the Armistice between Italy and Allied armed forces of 8 September 1943, after which it returned to Italy and disbanded within the month.

=== Cold War ===
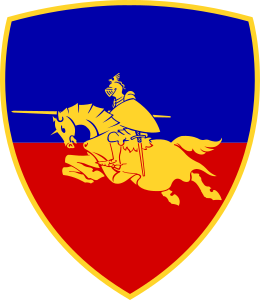
Coat of Arms of the Armored Division "Pozzuolo del Friuli"

On 1 January 1953 the Italian Army activated the Armored Division "Pozzuolo del Friuli" in Rome as its third armored division. The division consisted of the 4th Tank Regiment (three battalions with M26 Pershing tanks), 1st Bersaglieri Regiment (three battalions with M3 Half-tracks), the 1st Armored Artillery Regiment "Pozzuolo del Friuli" (three groups with M7 Priests self-propelled guns, one group with M36 tank destroyers, and one light anti-aircraft artillery group), and the I Engineer Battalion. In 1954 the division received the "Lancieri di Firenze" Armored Cavalry Squadron equipped with M8 Greyhound, which was expanded to full squadrons group by 1956.

In 1957 the army decided to concentrate its forces in the North-Eastern region of Friuli near the Yugoslav border. As first step of this realignment a Cavalry Brigade was activated in Gradisca d'Isonzo on 1 April 1957. The brigade consisted of the armored cavalry regiments "Piemonte Cavalleria", "Genova Cavalleria", and "Lancieri di Novara". Each of three regiments fielded two armored squadrons groups with M26 Pershing tanks. The remaining units of the brigade were the 8th Self-propelled Field Artillery Regiment, an engineer company, and a signal company. The brigade was part of the V Army Corps, which was tasked with defending North-Eastern Italy against a possible attack by either Yugoslav or Warsaw Pact forces. As next steps the army began the drawdown of forces of the Armored Division "Pozzuolo del Friuli" in Rome: on 1 May 1958 the 4th Tank Regiment was transferred to the Infantry Division "Legnano" and on 1 December 1958 the 1st Bersaglieri Regiment to the Infantry Division "Granatieri di Sardegna". The 1st Armored Artillery Regiment's four groups were transferred to four different artillery regiments and on 31 December 1958 the regiment itself, along with the "Lancieri di Firenze" Armored Cavalry Squadrons Group and the Armored Division "Pozzuolo del Friuli" Command, were disbanded.

On 1 January 1959 the Cavalry Brigade in Gradisca d'Isonzo changed its name to Cavalry Brigade "Pozzuolo del Friuli" and received the colours, symbols and traditions of the dissolved armored division and the preceding cavalry formations. The brigade was a mechanized brigade with one reconnaissance squadrons group, two mechanized cavalry regiments and a self-propelled artillery regiment. The brigade's structure in 1974 was as follows:

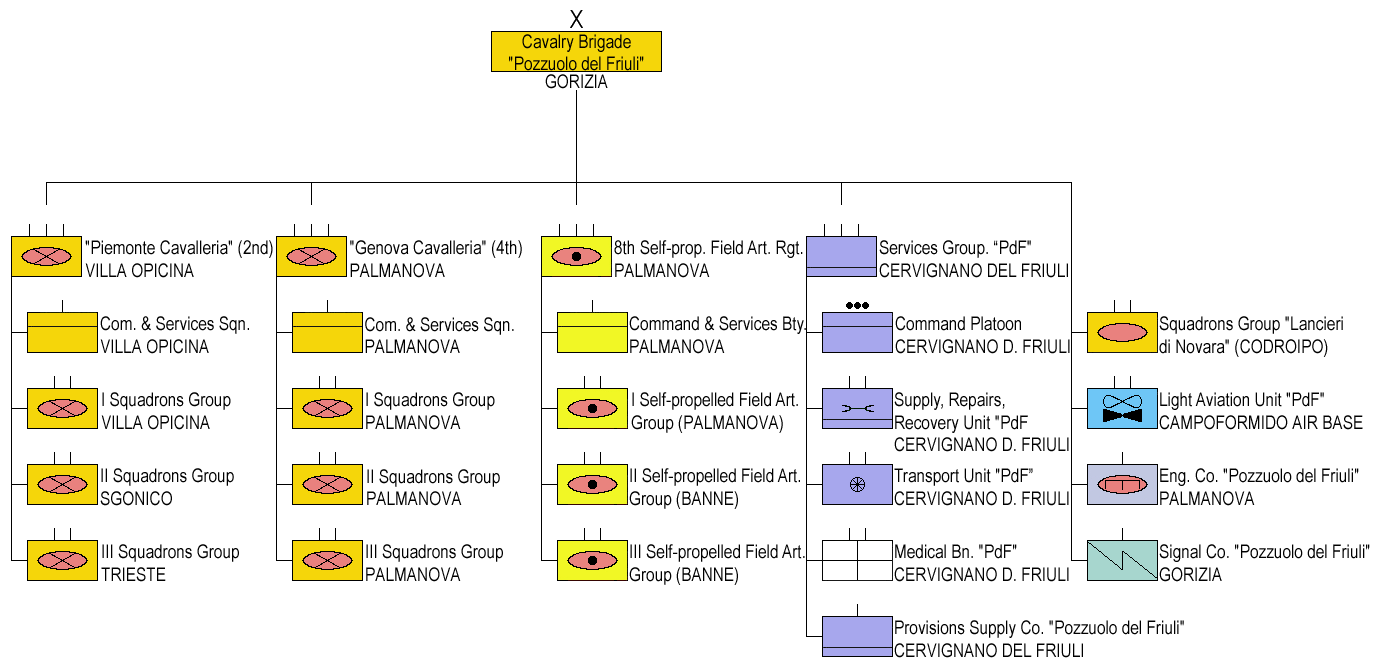
Cavalry Brigade "Pozzuolo del Friuli" in 1974

- Cavalry Brigade "Pozzuolo del Friuli", in Gorizia
  - Regiment "Piemonte Cavalleria" (2nd), in Villa Opicina
    - Command and Services Squadron, in Villa Opicina
    - I Squadrons Group, in Villa Opicina (Leopard 1 main battle tanks and M113 armored personnel carriers)
    - II Squadrons Group, in Sgonico (Leopard 1 main battle tanks and M113 armored personnel carriers)
    - III Squadrons Group, in Trieste (Leopard 1 main battle tanks and M113 armored personnel carriers)
  - Regiment "Genova Cavalleria" (4th), in Palmanova
    - Command and Services Squadron, in Palmanova
    - I Squadrons Group, in Palmanova (Leopard 1 main battle tanks and M113 armored personnel carriers)
    - II Squadrons Group, in Palmanova (Leopard 1 main battle tanks and M113 armored personnel carriers)
    - III Squadrons Group, in Palmanova (Leopard 1 main battle tanks and M113 armored personnel carriers)
  - 8th Self-propelled Field Artillery Regiment, in Palmanova
    - Command and Services Battery, in Palmanova
    - I Self-propelled Field Artillery Group, in Palmanova (M109G 155 mm self-propelled howitzers)
    - II Self-propelled Field Artillery Group, in Banne (M109G 155 mm self-propelled howitzers)
    - III Self-propelled Field Artillery Group, in Banne (M109G 155 mm self-propelled howitzers)
  - Squadrons Group "Lancieri di Novara", in Codroipo (Leopard 1A2 main battle tanks)
  - Light Aviation Unit "Pozzuolo del Friuli", at Udine-Campoformido Air Base (L-19E Bird Dog)
  - Engineer Company "Pozzuolo del Friuli", in Palmanova
  - Signal Company "Pozzuolo del Friuli", in Gorizia
  - Services Grouping "Pozzuolo del Friuli", in Cervignano del Friuli
    - Command Platoon, in Cervignano del Friuli
    - Supply, Repairs, Recovery Unit "Pozzuolo del Friuli", in Cervignano del Friuli
    - Medical Battalion "Pozzuolo del Friuli", in Cervignano del Friuli
    - Transport Unit "Pozzuolo del Friuli", in Cervignano del Friuli
    - Provisions Supply Company "Pozzuolo del Friuli", in Cervignano del Friuli

In 1975 the Italian Army undertook a major reform and the "Pozzuolo del Friuli" was split to raise a second cavalry brigade - the Armored Brigade "Vittorio Veneto" in Villa Opicina. With the reform the "Pozzuolo del Friuli" lost its independence and entered the Mechanized Division "Mantova". On 1 October 1975 the brigade had concluded its conversion to armored brigade and consisted of the following units.

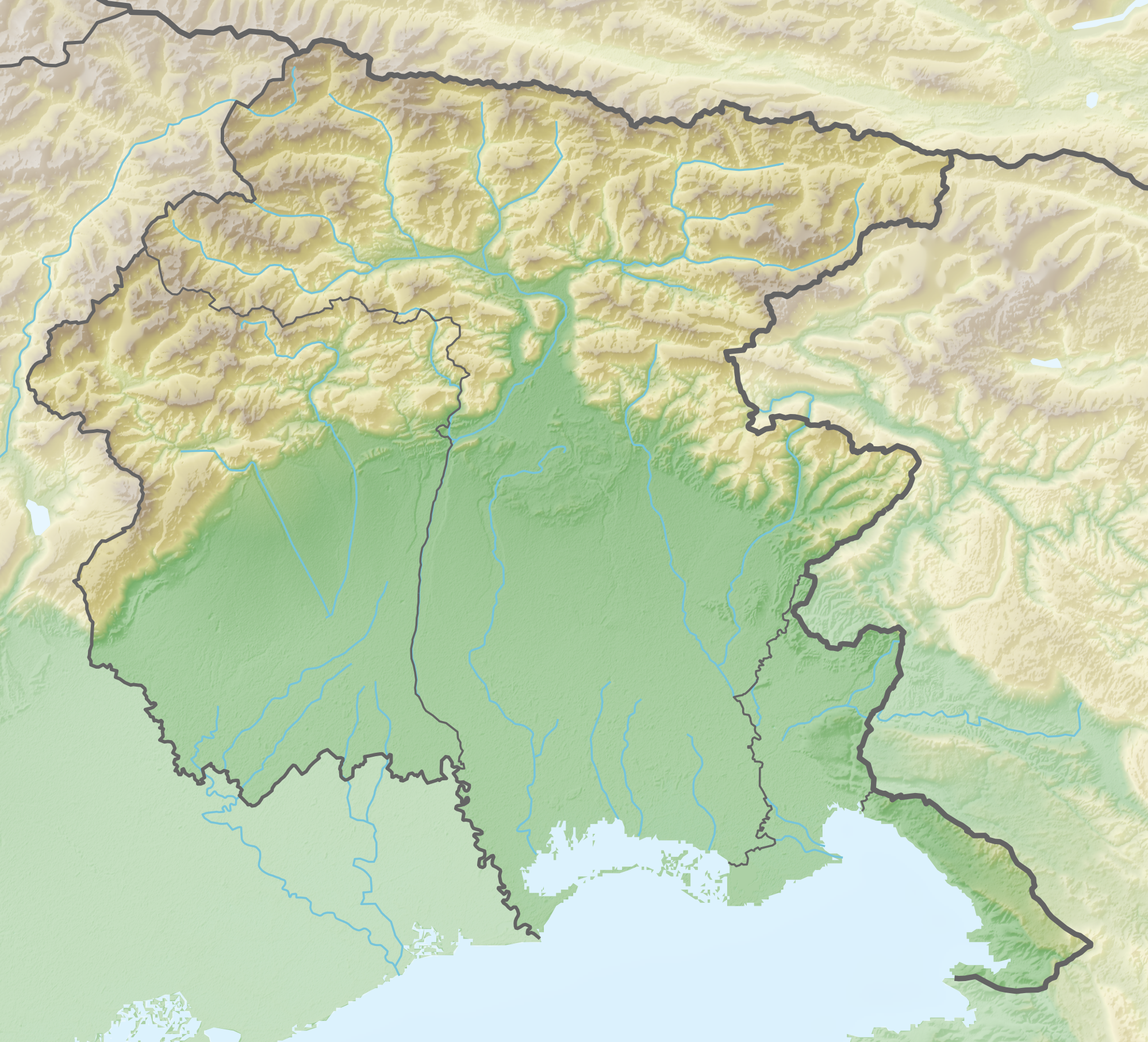
"Pozzuolo del Friuli" units in 1989
- Armored Brigade "Pozzuolo del Friuli", in Palmanova
  - Command and Signal Unit "Pozzuolo del Friuli", in Palmanova
  - 4th Mechanized Squadrons Group "Genova Cavalleria", in Palmanova (former I Squadrons Group, Regiment "Genova Cavalleria" (4th))
  - 5th Tank Squadrons Group "Lancieri di Novara", in Codroipo (Leopard 1A2 main battle tanks)
  - 28th Tank Squadrons Group "Cavalleggeri di Treviso", in Palmanova (Leopard 1A2 main battle tanks, former II Squadrons Group, Regiment "Genova Cavalleria" (4th))
  - 120th Self-propelled Field Artillery Group "Po", in Palmanova (M109G 155 mm self-propelled howitzers, former I Self-propelled Field Artillery Group, 8th Self-propelled Field Artillery Regiment)
  - Logistic Battalion "Pozzuolo del Friuli", in Visco
  - Anti-tank Squadron "Pozzuolo del Friuli", in Palmanova (BGM-71 TOW anti-tank guided missiles)
  - Engineer Company "Pozzuolo del Friuli", in Palmanova

In 1986 the Italian Army abolished the divisional level and the "Pozzuolo del Friuli" came under direct command of the 5th Army Corps. Additionally the brigade received the 7th Reconnaissance Squadrons Group "Lancieri di Milano" from the disbanded "Mantova" division. In 1989 with the end of the Cold War the army began to draw down its forces and the 7th "Lancieri di Milano" was disbanded on 11 December 1989.

In 1991 the brigade returned to use the name Cavalry Brigade "Pozzuolo del Friuli" after it had replaced its Leopard 1A2 tanks and VCC-2 armored personnel carries with wheeled Centauro tank destroyers. During the same year the 28th Tank Squadrons Group "Cavalleggeri di Treviso" and the 120th Self-propelled Field Artillery Group "Po" were disbanded on 31 March 1991, and replaced by the 2nd Mechanized Squadrons Group "Piemonte Cavalleria" and the 8th Self-propelled Field Artillery Group "Pasubio", which arrived from the disbanded Mechanized Brigade "Vittorio Veneto" on 31 July 1991. At the same time the battalions, groups, and squadrons groups of the army were allowed to return to use their traditional regimental names and so by the end of 1991 the "Pozzuolo del Friuli" brigade consisted of the following units:

- Cavalry Brigade "Pozzuolo del Friuli", in Palmanova
  - Command and Tactical Supports Unit "Pozzuolo del Friuli", in Palmanova
  - Regiment "Piemonte Cavalleria" (2nd), in Villa Opicina
  - Regiment "Genova Cavalleria" (4th), in Palmanova
  - Regiment "Lancieri di Novara" (5th), in Codroipo
  - 84th Infantry Battalion "Venezia" (Recruits Training), in Falconara Marittima
  - 8th Self-propelled Field Artillery Regiment "Pasubio", in Banne
  - Logistic Battalion "Pozzuolo del Friuli", in Visco

=== After the Cold War ===
In January 1997 the brigade lost the 84th Infantry (Recruits Training) Battalion "Venezia" and on 1 December 2000 the brigade received the Lagunari Regiment "Serenissima" in Venice and the 3rd Engineer Regiment in Udine from the disbanding Projection Forces Command. On 30 September 2001 the brigade disbanded the 8th Self-propelled Field Artillery Regiment, whose name was given to 11th Self-propelled Field Artillery Regiment "Teramo" of the Bersaglieri Brigade "Garibaldi" on 1 October 2001. As replacement the brigade received the 52nd Self-propelled Artillery Regiment "Torino" in Vercelli from the Armored Brigade "Centauro" on 1 January 2002. and the 21st Mechanized Infantry Regiment "Cremona" on 5 October 2002. The Cremona was disbanded one year later on 13 October 2003. On 31 December 2004 the 52nd Self-propelled Artillery Regiment with its heavy tracked M109 howitzers left the brigade and was replaced on 1 January 2005 by the Field Artillery Regiment "a Cavallo" in Milan, which fielded lighter FH-70 towed howitzers.

From 24 May until 5 September 2004 the brigade was the first Italian unit deployed to Iraq as part of the Multi-National Force – Iraq. The brigade has been deployed five times to Lebanon as part of the United Nations Interim Force in Lebanon.

=== 2013 reform ===
In 2013 the army decided to reduce its strength by two brigades. As part of this reform the "Pozzuolo del Friuli" was scheduled to merge with the Airmobile Brigade "Friuli". In preparation for the merger two of the Pozzuolo del Friuli's cavalry regiments were transferred to other brigades. However the reform was stopped and the disbandment of the brigade never implemented. The changes to the brigade's structure and changes of the structure in 2013 were as follows:

- Cavalry Brigade "Pozzuolo del Friuli", in Gorizia (Friuli-Venezia Giulia)
  - Command and Tactical Supports Unit "Pozzuolo del Friuli", in Gorizia
  - Regiment "Piemonte Cavalleria" (2nd), in Trieste (transferred to the Alpine Brigade "Julia" on 1 October 2014)
  - Regiment "Genova Cavalleria" (4th), in Palmanova
  - Regiment "Lancieri di Novara" (5th), in Codroipo (transferred to the 132nd Armored Brigade "Ariete" in January 2013)
  - Lagunari Regiment "Serenissima", in Venice
  - Field Artillery Regiment "a Cavallo", in Milan
  - 3rd Engineer Regiment, in Udine

== Organization ==
"Pozzuolo del Friuli" units in 2022

As of 4 October 2022 the brigade consists of the following units:

- Cavalry Brigade "Pozzuolo del Friuli", in Gorizia
  - Command and Tactical Supports Unit "Cavalleggeri di Treviso" (28th), in Gorizia
  - Regiment "Genova Cavalleria" (4th), in Palmanova (Centauro tank destroyers)
  - Lagunari Regiment "Serenissima" (Italian Army Marines), in Mestre
    - Lagunari Battalion, in Venice-Malcontenta (VTLM Lince vehicles)
    - Amphibious Tactical Support Company, on Vignole Island (AAV7-A1 amphibious assault vehicles)
  - Field Artillery Regiment "a Cavallo" (Horse Artillery), in Vercelli
    - 1st Howitzer Group "M.O. Gioacchino Bellezza", in Vercelli (FH-70 towed howitzers)
    - 2nd Horse Group "M.O. Sergio Bresciani", in Milan (ceremonial 75/27 Mod. 1912 horse-drawn guns)
  - 3rd Engineer Regiment, in Udine
  - Logistic Regiment "Pozzuolo del Friuli", in Remanzacco

All regiments are battalion sized.

=== Sea Projection Force ===
The "Pozzuolo del Friuli" forms, together with the Italian Navy's 3rd Naval Division, and San Marco Marine Brigade, the Italian Armed Forces' Sea Projection Force (Italian: Forza di proiezione dal mare). The following units of the brigade are earmarked for the Sea Projection Force:

- Lagunari Regiment "Serenissima"
- 2x Reconnaissance Squadrons from the Regiment "Genova Cavalleria" (4th)
- 2x Howitzer Batteries from the Field Artillery Regiment "a Cavallo"
- 2x Sapper Companies from the 3rd Engineer Regiment
- Logistic elements from the Logistic Regiment "Pozzuolo del Friuli"

== Equipment ==
The "Genova Cavalleria" regiment is equipped with Centauro tank destroyers and Lince light multirole vehicles. The Lagunari regiment is equipped with AAV7-A1 amphibious assault vehicles and Lince vehicles; the regiment's maneuver support company is equipped with 120 mm mortars and Spike anti-tank guided missile systems. In the near future the army plans to replace the AAV7-A1 with Amphibious Combat Vehicles. The artillery regiment of the brigade fields 18x FH-70 towed howitzers.

== Gorget patches ==
The personnel of the brigade's units wears the following gorget patches:

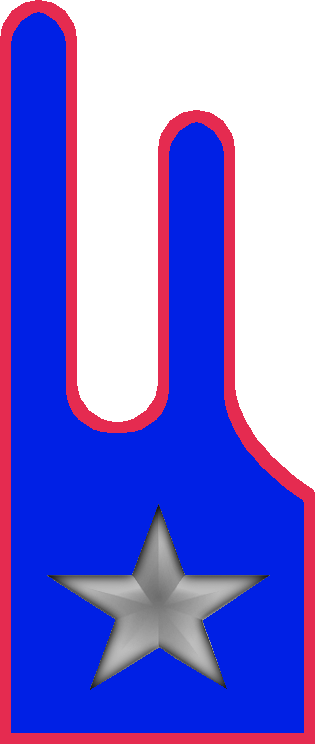
Command and Tactical Supports Unit "Cavalleggeri di Treviso" (28th)

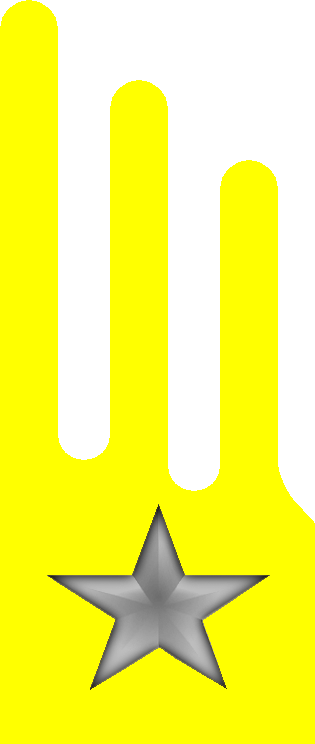
Regiment "Genova Cavalleria" (4th)

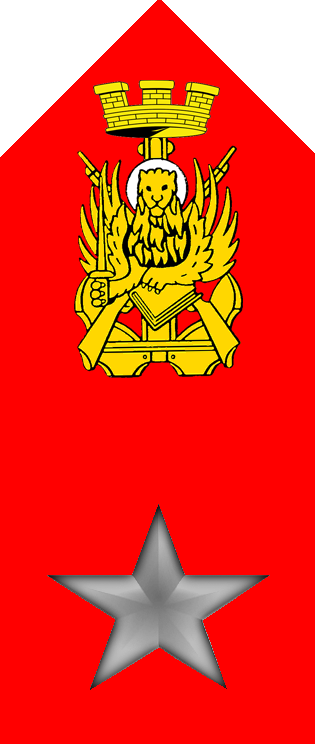
Lagunari Regiment "Serenissima"

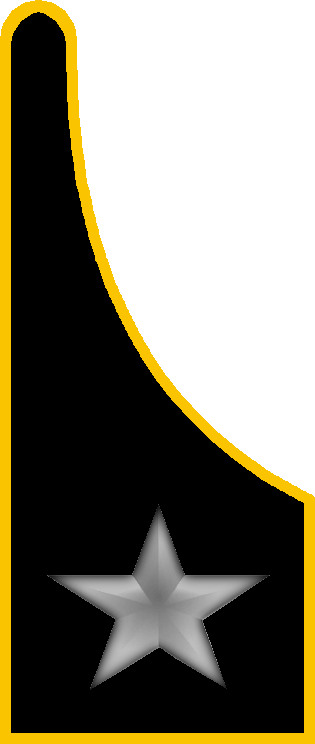
Field Artillery Regiment "a Cavallo"

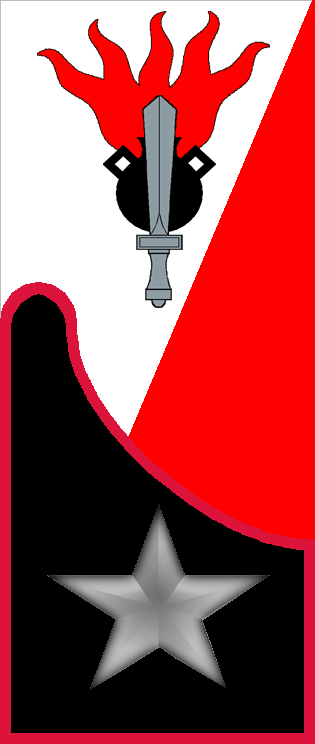
3rd Engineer Regiment

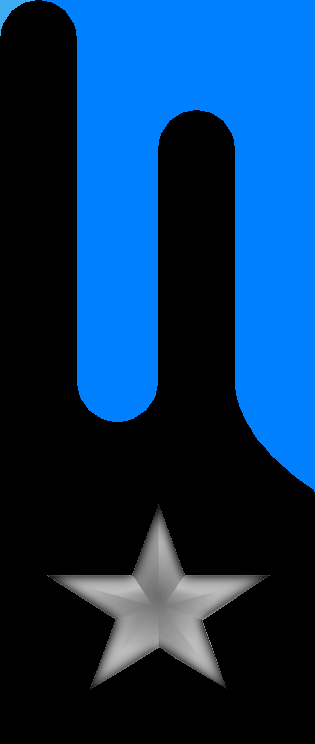
Logistic Regiment "Pozzuolo del Friuli"
