= 135th Armored Cavalry Division "Ariete" =

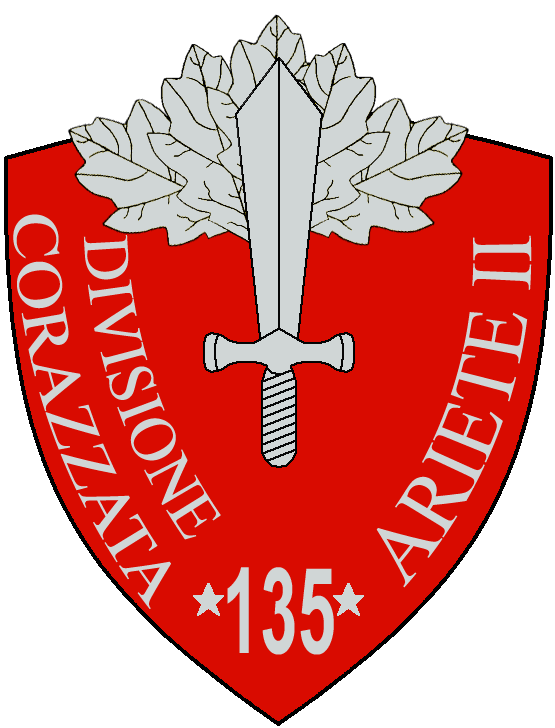
- 135th Armored Cavalry Division "Ariete" insignia
- Active: 1 April 1943 – 12 September 1943
- Country: Kingdom of Italy
- Branch: Royal Italian Army
- Type: Armored
- Size: Division
- Garrison/HQ: Ferrara
- Mottos: "Ferrea mole, Ferreo cuore"
- Colors: blue and red

Insignia
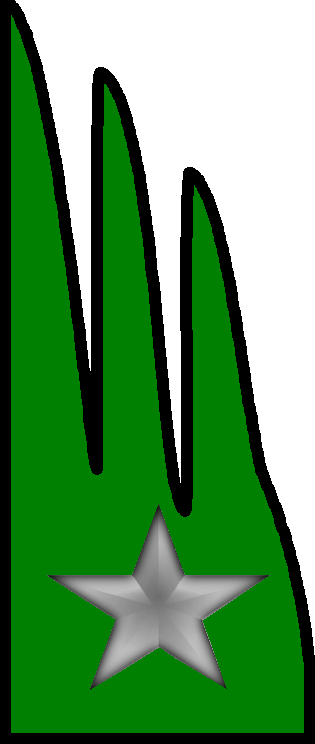
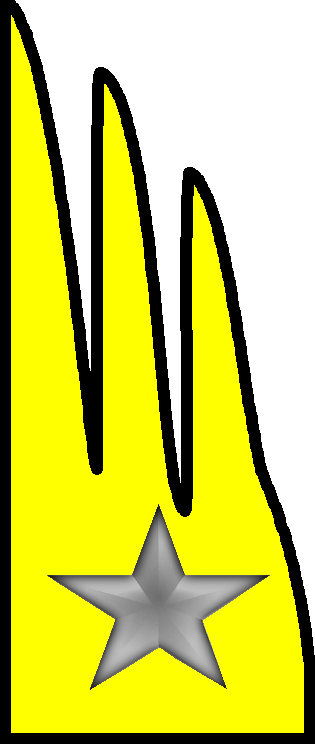
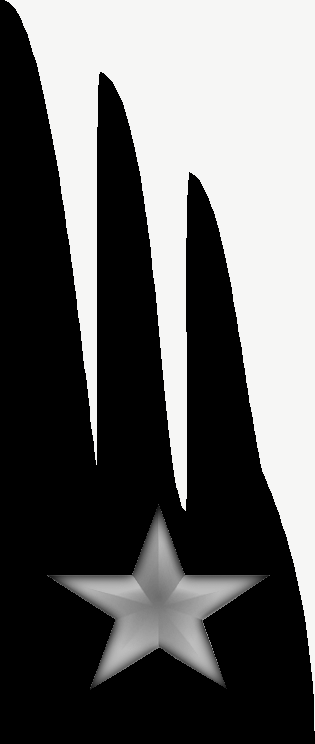
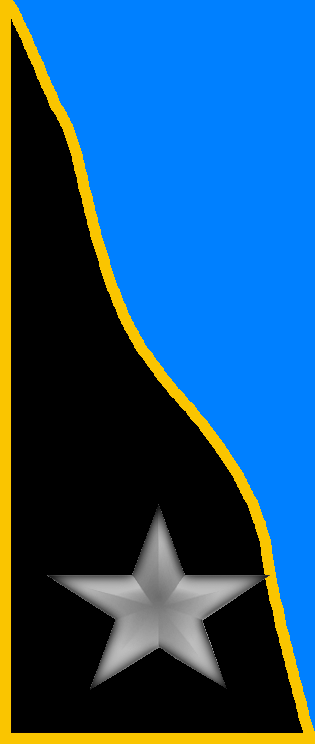
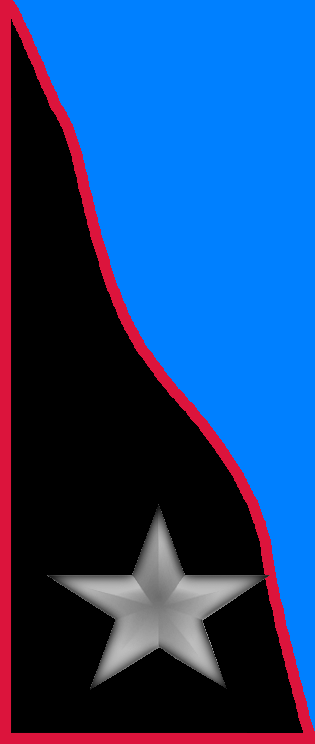
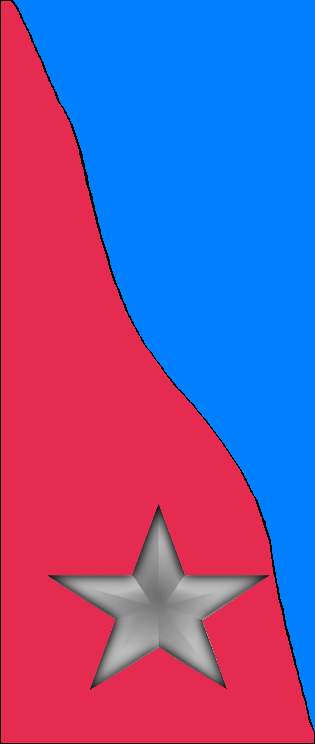
- Identification symbol: Ariete II gorget patches

The 135th Armored Cavalry Division "Ariete" (Italian: 135ª Divisione cavalleria corazzata "Ariete", colloquially also known as "135th Armored Division "Ariete II") was an armored division of the Royal Italian Army during World War II. It was formed in 1943 and named to commemorate the 132nd Armored Division "Ariete", which had distinguished itself during the Western Desert campaign and was destroyed during the Second Battle of El Alamein. After the announcement of the Armistice of Cassibile on 8 September 1943 the division fought the invading German forces South of Rome. After two days the division was forced to surrender and was disbanded by the Germans on 12 September 1943.

== History ==
The 132nd Armored Division "Ariete" had been formed in Milan in February 1939 and been sent to Libya in 1941. The division participated in all battles of the Western Desert campaign until it fought to annihilation during the Second Battle of El Alamein. On 21 November 1942 the remnants of the 132nd Armored Division "Ariete" were combined with the remnants of the 133rd Armored Division "Littorio" and 101st Motorized Division "Trieste" as Tactical Group "Ariete". The Tactical Group fought a successful rearguard action at El Agheila, but was soon afterwards disbanded. On 8 December 1942 the Ariete division was officially declared lost.

On 1 April 1943 the 135th Armored Cavalry Division "Ariete" was activated in Ferrara. The division was made up of cavalry regiments and General Raffaele Cadorna, the commander of the army's Cavalry Application School, became the division's first (and only) commander. The division remained in the Emilia region until it moved to Rome in August 1943 in the wake of the fall of the fascist regime of Benito Mussolini on 26 July 1943.

The division was assigned to the Motorized-Armored Army Corps and tasked with defense of the northern approaches to Rome on both sides of Lake Bracciano in the towns of Monterosi and Manziana. On 8 September 1943, when the Armistice of Cassibile was announced, the division's strength was 8,500 men, with 176 working tanks and armored vehicles, about 70 cannons and 92 20mm anti-aircraft guns.

On 9 September 1943 the division successfully blocked the advance of the German 3rd Panzergrenadier Division and elements of the 26th Panzer Division. In Monterosi the German vanguard was blocked by the division's mixed engineer battalion, which was supported by the Regiment "Cavalleggeri di Lucca" and the III Group of the 135th Artillery Regiment with 149/19 Mod. 37 howitzers. After the flight of the Italian King Victor Emmanuel III and his government from Rome the division was ordered on 10 September to move to Tivoli and abandon the defense of Rome. Cadorna did as ordered, but dispatched the lancers of the Regiment "Lancieri di Montebello" to the South of Rome to assist the 12th Infantry Division "Sassari" and 21st Infantry Division "Granatieri di Sardegna" in the defense of the city. The lancers under General Dardano Fenulli arrived in time to fight in the Battle of Porta Pia against the German 2. Fallschirmjäger-Division. In the late afternoon the Italian units defending Rome were told that an agreement with the Germans had been reached and ordered to surrender.

The next day, on 11 September 1943, the division's commander General Cadorna went into hiding and joined the resistance in Rome, the Clandestine Military Front of Colonel Giuseppe Cordero Lanza di Montezemolo. On 12 September 1943 the 135th Armored Cavalry Division "Ariete" was officially dissolved.

== Organization ==
During its existence the division continuously underwent changes to its organization. As the army's premier armored unit the division received the newest tanks and self-propelled guns as they came of the production lines and in turn ceded older equipment to other units. The list below is the best sourced table of organization and equipment of the division on 8 September 1943 available:

135th Armored Cavalry Division "Ariete" organization in 1943

- 135th Armored Cavalry Division "Ariete"
  - Headquarters
    - Command Squadron
    - 169th Carabinieri Section
    - 160th Field Post Office
  - Armored Reconnaissance Grouping "Lancieri di Montebello"
    - Command Squadron (4 × 20/65 mod. 35 anti-aircraft guns)
    - I Group
      - Command Squadron (4 × AB41 armored cars)
      - 1st Squadron (17 × AB41 armored cars)
      - 2nd Squadron (17 × AB41 armored cars)
      - 3rd Motorcyclists Squadron
    - II Group
      - Command Squadron (4 × Semovente da 47/32 self-propelled guns)
      - 4th Motorcyclists Squadron
      - 5th Squadron (12 × Semovente da 75/18 (on M15/42 chassis) self-propelled guns)
      - 6th Squadron (12 × Semovente da 47/32 self-propelled guns)
    - III Group (formed in summer 1943)
      - Command Squadron (4 × M15/42 tanks)
      - 7th Squadron (17 × M15/42 tanks)
      - 8th Squadron (16 × L6/40 light tanks)
      - 9th Anti-aircraft Squadron (12 × 20/65 mod. 35 anti-aircraft guns)
  - Armored Regiment "Vittorio Emanuele II"
    - Command Squadron (4 × 20/65 mod. 35 anti-aircraft guns)
    - Anti-aircraft Squadron (12 × 20/65 mod. 35 anti-aircraft guns)
    - Recovery and Repairs Squadron
    - 66th Heavy Mobile Workshop
    - 3 × Tank groups
      - each group with 3 × squadrons (10 × Semovente da 75/18 (on M15/42 chassis) and 7 × M15/42 tanks tanks per squadron)
  - Motorized Regiment "Cavalleggeri di Lucca"
    - Command Squadron (4 × 20/65 anti-aircraft guns)
    - Motorcyclists Squadron (includes 4 × AB41 armored cars)
    - Self-propelled Squadron (12 × Semovente da 75/18 (on M15/42 chassis))
    - Transport Unit
    - 3 × Dismounted groups
      - 2 × Auto-transported squadrons
      - Support Weapons and Anti-aircraft Squadron (4 × 75/18 self-propelled guns and 4 × 20/65 anti-aircraft guns)
      - Mortar Squadron (9 × 81mm Mod. 35 mortars)
  - 135th Armored Artillery Regiment "Ariete" (formed on 1 April 1943 by the depot of the 3rd Artillery Regiment "Pistoia" in Bologna)
    - Command Unit
    - I Group (12 × 100/22 mod. 14/19 howitzers)
    - II Group (12 × 100/22 mod. 14/19 howitzers)
    - CLIX Group (12 × 149/19 mod. 37 howitzers; formed by the 11th Army Corps Artillery Regiment)
    - DXXI Anti-aircraft Group (12 × 90/53 anti-aircraft guns; formed by the 4th Anti-aircraft Artillery Regiment)
  - 235th Self-propelled Anti-tank Artillery Regiment "Ariete"
    - Command Unit
    - XX Anti-tank Artillery Group (12 × 75/32 mod. 37 anti-tank guns)
    - XXI Anti-tank Artillery Group (12 × 75/32 mod. 37 anti-tank guns)
    - DCI Self-propelled Group (12 × Semovente da 105/25 self-propelled guns)
    - DCII Self-propelled Group (12 × Semovente da 105/25 self-propelled guns)
  - CXXXV Self-propelled Anti-tank Battalion (12 × Semovente da 75/34 (on M15/42 chassis) self-propelled guns)
  - CXXXV Mixed Engineer Battalion
  - 135th Medical Section
  - 135th Supply Section
  - 134th Mixed Transport Unit

== Commanding officers ==
The division's commanding officers were:

- Generale di Brigata Raffaele Cadorna (1 April 1943 - 12 September 1943)
