= Regiment "Lancieri Vittorio Emanuele II" (10th) =

Inactive Italian Army cavalry unit

- Reggimento "Lancieri Vittorio Emanuele II" (10°)
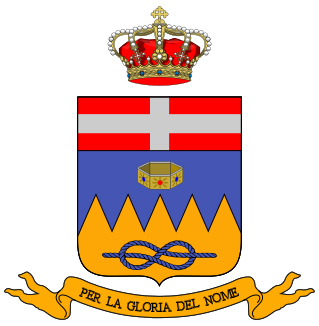
- Regimental coat of arms
- Active: 10 June 1859 — 14 Sept. 1943
- Country: Kingdom of Italy
- Branch: Royal Italian Army
- Part of: 135th Armored Cavalry Division "Ariete"
- Motto: "Per la gloria del nome"
- Anniversaries: 19 June 1918 - Battle of Monastier
- Decorations: 1× Bronze Medal of Military Valor

Insignia
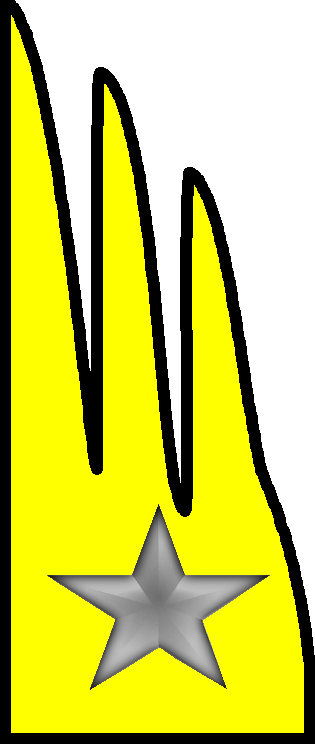
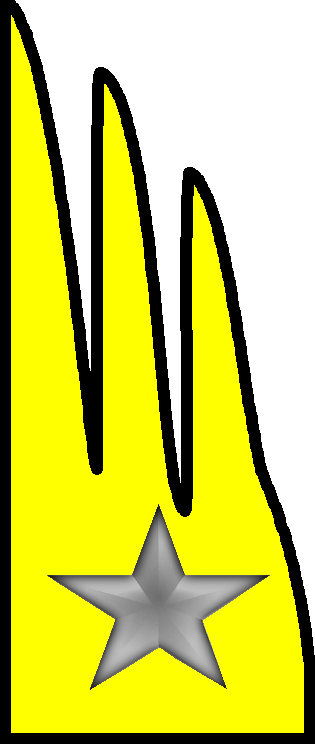
- Regimental gorget patches

The Regiment "Lancieri Vittorio Emanuele II" (10th) (Italian: Reggimento "Lancieri Vittorio Emanuele II" (10°) - "Lancers Vittorio Emanuele II") is an inactive cavalry unit of the Italian Army. In 1859, the Royal Sardinian Army formed the Regiment Vittorio Emanuele Cavalry with volunteers from Veneto and Romagna, which had arrived in Turin after the outbreak of the Second Italian War of Independence. In 1860, the regiment fought in the Sardinian campaign in central Italy and in 1866, in the Third Italian War of Independence. In World War I the regiment fought on the Italian Front. During World War II the regiment was initially assigned to the 2nd Cavalry Division "Emanuele Filiberto Testa di Ferro", with which it participated in April 1941 in the invasion of Yugoslavia. In 1942, the regiment was equipped with tanks and self-propelled guns and renamed Armored Regiment "Vittorio Emanuele II". In 1943, the regiment was assigned to the 135th Armored Cavalry Division "Ariete". After the announcement of the Armistice of Cassibile on 8 September 1943, the regiment fought against invading German forces. On 14 September 1943, the regiment's officers dissolved the regiment. The regiment's anniversary falls on 19 June 1918, the fourth day of the Second Battle of the Piave River, on which the regiment defeated an Austro-Hungarian attack near Monastier di Treviso, for which the regiment was awarded a Bronze Medal of Military Valor. As the regiment is a lancer unit, its enlisted personnel is addressed as "Lancer" (Italian: Lanciere).

== History ==
=== Italian Wars of Independence ===
==== Second Italian War of Independence ====
On 21 July 1858, French Emperor Napoleon III and the Prime Minister of Sardinia Camillo Benso, Count of Cavour met in Plombières and reached a secret verbal agreement on a military alliance between the French Empire and the Kingdom of Sardinia against the Austrian Empire. On 26 January 1859, Napoleon III signed the Franco-Sardinian Treaty, followed by King Victor Emmanuel II on 29 January 1859. On 9 March 1859, Sardinia mobilized its army, followed by Austria on 9 April. On 23 April, Austria delivered an ultimatum to Sardinia demanding its demobilization. Upon Sardinia's refusal, Austria declared war on 26 April and three days later the Austrians crossed the Ticino river into Piedmont. Consequently, France honored its alliance with Sardinia and declared war on Austria on 3 May 1859, which led to the Second Italian War of Independence.

After the declaration of war, volunteers from Veneto, which at the time was part of the Austrian Empire, and the Romagna, which was part of the papal state, arrived in Turin. On 10 June 1859, the Royal Sardinian Army formed with these volunteers the Regiment Vittorio Emanuele Cavalry (Italian: Reggimento Vittorio Emanuele Cavalleria). The regiment was named for the King of Sardinia Victor Emmanuel II and its troops were armed with lance, sabre and pistolone — a pistol with a shoulder stock. On 24 June 1859, the Sardinian, French and Austrian armies met in the Battle of Solferino. On 11 July 1859, Emperor Napoleon III and Emperor Franz Joseph I met at Villafranca and concluded the Armistice of Villafranca, which ended the war. The Regiment Vittorio Emanuele Cavalry did not see action in the war and was instead sent in July to occupy Bologna in the Papal Legations of the Romagne. On 30 November 1859, the Duchy of Parma and Piacenza, Duchy of Modena and Reggio, and the Papal Legations of the Romagne were united under the Royal Government of Emilia, which on 1 January 1860 was redesignated as the Royal Provinces of Emilia. On 11 and 12 March 1860, the Royal Provinces of Emilia voted in a plebiscite for annexation by the Kingdom of Sardinia. On 18 March 1860, the annexation act was presented to Victor Emmanuel II, one week later, on 25 March 1860, the Regiment Vittorio Emanuele Cavalry was incorporated into the Royal Sardinian Army. On 6 June of the same year, the Sardinian War Ministry ordered that the army's cavalry regiments, which were equipped with lances — with the exception of the four line cavalry regiments — were to join the new Lancers speciality. Consequently, on the same day, the Regiment Vittorio Emanuele Cavalry was renamed Regiment "Lancieri Vittorio Emanuele".

In September 1860, the regiment participated in the Sardinian campaign in central Italy, during which the regiment fought on 11 September in the occupation of Pesaro and on 18 September in the Battle of Castelfidardo. From 24 to 29 September 1860, the regiment fought in the Siege of Ancona. On 16 February 1864, the regiment ceded its 6th Squadron to help form the Regiment "Lancieri di Foggia".

==== Third Italian War of Independence ====
On 20 June 1866, the Third Italian War of Independence between the Kingdom of Italy and the Austrian Empire began. During the war the Regiment "Lancieri Vittorio Emanuele" formed, together with the Regiment "Lancieri di Firenze" and Regiment "Cavalleggeri di Monferrato", the II Cavalry Brigade of the IV Corps of the Army of the Po, which operated along the Po river. On 5 July 1866, the Army of the Po began the siege of the Austrian fortress at Borgoforte and during the night between 6 and 7 July the army crossed the Po river. On 11 July, the first forces of the Army of the Po entered Rovigo, which had been abandoned by the Austrians, as the Austrian forces in Italy had received the order to retreat towards the Isonzo river and the Trentino region. On 14 July, the Italian IV Corps ceded five divisions and the Italian I Corps one division to form the V Corps and VI Corps. Additionally the Italian II Corps and III Corps ceded both one division to form the VIII Corps. Afterwards the Army of the Po, which now consisted of the I, IV, V, VI, and VIII corps with a combined force of 14 divisions and six cavalry brigades, began a rapid advance through Veneto towards the Isonzo river without encountering Austrian forces. During the advance, the 5th Squadron of the Regiment "Lancieri Vittorio Emanuele" was the first Italian unit to enter Padua, where the squadron was informed by local railwaymen that an Austrian supply train remained at the railway station in Vicenza. The 5th Squadron's commander then commandeered one of the trains stranded at the Padua Railway Station and with ten of his men and around thirty volunteers from Padua moved to Vicenza, where the Austrian supply train and also an Austrian military magazine were captured.

On 10 September 1871, the regiment was renamed 10th Cavalry Regiment (Vittorio Emanuele), and on 5 November 1876, Cavalry Regiment "Vittorio Emanuele" (10th). In 1887, the regiment provided personnel and horses for the formation of the Mounted Hunters Squadron, which fought in the Italo-Ethiopian War of 1887–1889. In 1895-96, the regiment provided one officer and 68 enlisted for units deployed to Italian Eritrea for the First Italo-Ethiopian War. On 16 December 1897, the regiment was renamed Regiment "Lancieri Vittorio Emanuele" (10th). On 29 July 1900, Victor Emmanuel III ascended to the throne of Italy and consequently, on 30 August 1900, the regiment was renamed Regiment "Lancieri Vittorio Emanuele II" (10th). On 1 October 1909, the regiment ceded its 3rd Squadron to help form the Regiment "Lancieri di Vercelli" (26th). In 1911–12, the regiment provided 174 enlisted to units deployed for the Italo-Turkish War.

=== World War I ===
At the outbreak of World War I the regiment consisted of a command, a depot, and two cavalry groups, with the I Group consisting of three squadrons and the II Group consisting of two squadrons and a machine gun section. Together with the Regiment "Lancieri di Milano" (7th) the regiment formed the III Cavalry Brigade, which was assigned to the 2nd Cavalry Division "Veneto". On 24 May 1915, one day after Italy had declared war against the Austro-Hungarian Empire, the III Cavalry Brigade crossed the border and occupied Cervignano del Friuli and on 27 May, the city of Grado. In April 1916, the 2nd Cavalry Division was dismounted for service in the trenches of the Italian front, however once the Austro-Hungarian Army began the Asiago offensive the division was quickly mounted again and sent to guard the assembly of the Italian 5th Army around Vicenza.

In 1917, the regiment's depot in Vicenza formed the 859th Dismounted Machine Gunners Company as reinforcement for the regiment. On 24 October 1917, the Imperial German Army and Austro-Hungarian Army began the Battle of Caporetto and already on the first day of the battle the German 14th Army broke through the Italian lines at Kobarid. All mounted Italian cavalry regiments were sent forward to cover the retreat of the Italian 2nd Army and 3rd Army from the Isonzo front. The III Cavalry Brigade was assigned to cover the retreat of the 2nd Army and the Regiment "Lancieri Vittorio Emanuele II" (10th) fought delaying actions at Adegliacco on the Torre river, Torreano, San Vito di Fagagna, and then at San Daniele del Friuli. The regiment then fell back to the new Italian line along the Piave river.

On 15 June 1918, the Austro-Hungarian Army began the Second Battle of the Piave River, during which Austro-Hungarian forces crossed the Piave river. In the first days of the battle, the regiment's dismounted troops fought at Rovarè and San Pietro Novello. On 19 June, half of the regiment's 1st Squadron was encircled by Austro-Hungarian troops near Monastier di Treviso and fought its way out of the encirclement with drawn sabres. On the same day, the regiment's 2nd Squadron and Machine Gunners Squadron covered the Italian infantry's retreat from the outlying trenches at Monastier di Treviso to San Pietro Novello, while the regiment's 3rd, 4th, and 5th squadrons drove Austro-Hungarian troops back, which had broken into the Italian line at San Pietro Novello. On 23 and 24 June, the regiment fought in the Italian counterattack to dislodge the Austro-Hungarian bridgehead on the Piave Vecchia river. On 24 October 1918, the Royal Italian Army began the Battle of Vittorio Veneto and on 30 October, the regiment, like all cavalry regiments, was ordered to pursue the retreating Austro-Hungarian armies. On 4 November 1918, the regiment arrived in Gonars, where it was informed of the Armistice of Villa Giusti.

For its conduct at Monastier di Treviso and on the Piave Vecchia during the Second Battle of the Piave River and the pursuit of the fleeing enemy after Battle of Vittorio Veneto the Regiment "Lancieri Vittorio Emanuele II" (10th) was awarded a Bronze Medal of Military Valor, which was affixed to the regiment's standard.

=== Interwar years ===
After the war the Royal Italian Army disbanded the second groups of all thirty cavalry regiments, while the first groups were reduced to two squadrons. On 21 November 1919, 14 cavalry regiments were disbanded and their groups transferred to 14 of the remaining cavalry regiments. One of the disbanded regiments was the Regiment "Cavalleggeri di Aquila" (27th), whose group was renamed II Squadrons Group "Cavalleggeri di Aquila". Afterwards, the squadrons group, which remained based in Brescia and retained the disbanded regiment's standard, was assigned to the Regiment "Lancieri Vittorio Emanuele II" (10th).

On 20 May 1920, the Royal Italian Army disbanded five additional cavalry regiments, among them the Regiment "Lancieri di Montebello" (8th), whose II Squadrons Group "Cavalleggeri di Catania" in Turin was transferred to the Regiment "Lancieri Vittorio Emanuele II" (10th). On the same date, 20 May 1920, the Regiment "Lancieri Vittorio Emanuele II" ceded a squadron of its I Squadrons Group to the Regiment "Savoia Cavalleria" (3rd), retired its lances and was renamed Regiment "Cavalleggeri Vittorio Emanuele II". On 1 July 1920, the II Squadrons Group "Cavalleggeri di Aquila" and one of the squadrons group's squadrons in Brescia were disbanded, while both, the Regiment "Cavalleggeri Vittorio Emanuele II" and the II Squadrons Group "Cavalleggeri di Catania" moved to Brescia, where the regiment took over the barracks of the disbanded II Squadrons Group "Cavalleggeri di Aquila". Furthermore, on the same day, 1 July 1920, the traditions and standards of the Regiment "Cavalleggeri di Catania" (22nd) and Regiment "Cavalleggeri di Aquila" (27th) were entrusted to the Regiment "Cavalleggeri Vittorio Emanuele II". On 24 May 1925, the standards of the two disbanded regiments were transferred to the Shrine of the Flags, which at the time was located in Castel Sant'Angelo, for safekeeping.

In 1926, the regiment moved from Brescia to Bologna. On 8 February 1934, the regiment was renamed Regiment "Lancieri Vittorio Emanuele II". On 1 January 1935, the regiment was assigned, together with the Regiment "Lancieri di Novara" and Regiment "Lancieri di Firenze", to the 2nd Cavalry Division. In 1935-36, the regiment provided eight officers and 543 enlisted for units deployed to East Africa for the Second Italo-Ethiopian War.

=== World War II ===
At the outbreak of World War II the regiment was assigned to the 2nd Cavalry Division "Emanuele Filiberto Testa di Ferro" and consisted of a command, a command squadron, the 5th Machine Gunners Squadron, and the I and II squadrons groups, which both consisted of two mounted squadrons. The regiment fielded 37 officers, 37 non-commissioned officers, 798 enlisted troops and 818 horses. The regiment was equipped with one car, six motorcycles, 16 trucks, 36 Breda mod. 30 light machine guns, and 12 Fiat mod. 35 heavy machine guns. In March 1941, the regiment's 4th Squadron was sent to Albania to reinforce the Regiment "Lancieri di Milano", which was fighting in the Greco-Italian War. Between 6 and 18 April 1941, the 2nd Cavalry Division "Emanuele Filiberto Testa di Ferro" fought in the invasion of Yugoslavia. Afterwards, the division was sent to Bosnia and Herzegovina on anti-partisan duty. In October 1940, the regiment's depot in Bologna formed a new 4th Squadron, and the following month, the regiment returned to its barracks in Bologna.

On 1 January 1942, the regiment was reorganized as an armored unit and renamed Armored Regiment "Vittorio Emanuele II". Afterwards, the regiment's organization was as follows:

- Armored Regiment "Vittorio Emanuele II"
  - Command Squadron
    - Command Platoon
    - 2 × Cannon platoons, each with 2 × 20/65 mod. 35 anti-aircraft guns
  - I Tank Group
    - 3 × Squadrons
      - Command Platoon, with 2 × M15/42 radio tanks
      - 1 × Tank platoon, with 5 × M15/42 tanks
      - 2 × Self-propelled platoons, each with 5 × Semovente da 75/18 self-propelled guns
  - II Tank Group
    - same organization as I Tank Group
  - III Tank Group
    - same organization as I Tank Group
  - Anti-aircraft Squadron
    - Command Platoon
    - 4 × Cannon platoons, each with 2 × 20/65 mod. 35 anti-aircraft guns mounted on trucks
  - Recovery and Repairs Squadron
  - 66th Heavy Mobile Workshop

On 1 May 1942, the 2nd Cavalry Division "Emanuele Filiberto Testa di Ferro" was renamed 134th Armored Division "Emanuele Filiberto Testa di Ferro". On 1 August 1942, the Armored Regiment "Vittorio Emanuele II" left the division and was transferred to the Armored and Motorized Troops Inspectorate. On 1 March 1943, the regiment's depot in Bologna reformed the Motorized Regiment "Cavalleggeri di Lucca".

On 1 April 1943, both regiments, the Armored Regiment "Vittorio Emanuele II" and the Motorized Regiment "Cavalleggeri di Lucca", were assigned to the newly formed 135th Armored Cavalry Division "Ariete", which also included the Armored Reconnaissance Grouping "Lancieri di Montebello", 135th Armored Artillery Regiment "Ariete", and 235th Self-propelled Anti-tank Artillery Regiment "Ariete". The "Ariete" division remained in the Emilia region until August 1943, when it was sent to Rome after the fall of the fascist regime of Benito Mussolini on 26 July 1943. The division was assigned to the Motorized-Armored Army Corps and tasked with defense of the northern approaches to Rome on both sides of Lake Bracciano in the towns of Monterosi and Manziana.

In the evening of 8 September 1943, the Armistice of Cassibile, which ended hostilities between the Kingdom of Italy and the Anglo-American Allies, was announced by General Dwight D. Eisenhower on Radio Algiers and by Marshal Pietro Badoglio on Italian radio. At the time, "Ariete" division's strength was 8,500 men, with 176 working tanks and armored vehicles, about 70 cannons and 92 20mm anti-aircraft guns. Germany reacted by invading Italy and the next day, on 9 September 1943, the "Ariete" division successfully blocked the advance of the German 3rd Panzergrenadier Division and elements of the German 26th Panzer Division.

After the flight of King Victor Emmanuel III and his government from Rome, the division was ordered on 10 September to abandon the defense of the city and move to Tivoli further East. The division's commander General Raffaele Cadorna did as ordered, but dispatched the lancers of the Armored Reconnaissance Grouping "Lancieri di Montebello" to the South of Rome to assist the 12th Infantry Division "Sassari" and 21st Infantry Division "Granatieri di Sardegna", which continued to defend the city. The next day, on 11 September 1943, General Cadorna ordered to hide the standards and flags of the "Ariete" division's units, and then went into hiding in Rome, where he joined the Clandestine Military Front of Colonel Giuseppe Cordero Lanza di Montezemolo to fight the German occupiers. On 14 September 1943, the officers of the Armored Regiment "Vittorio Emanuele II" disbanded the regiment.

During the war the regiment's depot in Bologna formed the following dismounted units:

- Command of the 1st Dismounted Grouping "Lancieri Vittorio Emanuele II"
- II Road Movement Battalion "Lancieri Vittorio Emanuele II"
- VII Road Movement Battalion "Lancieri Vittorio Emanuele II"
- X Machine Gunners Group "Lancieri Vittorio Emanuele II"
- X Dismounted Group "Lancieri Vittorio Emanuele II"
- XI Dismounted Group "Lancieri Vittorio Emanuele II"
- XVIII Dismounted Group "Lancieri Vittorio Emanuele II"
- XXVI Dismounted Group "Lancieri Vittorio Emanuele II"

The X Machine Gunners Group "Lancieri Vittorio Emanuele II", which had been formed on 2 June 1940, was immediately sent to Libya for the upcoming invasion of Egypt. In September 1940, the group advanced with other units of the Italian 10th Army to Sidi Barrani in Egypt, where the Italian units dug in. On 9 December 1940, the British Western Desert Force began Operation Compass with the aim to drive the Italians out of Egypt. Within days the Italian 10th Army was falling apart and during the Italian retreat to Bardia the X Machine Gunners Group "Lancieri Vittorio Emanuele II" was overtaken by motorized British formations and forced to surrender.
