= Regiment "Cavalleggeri di Lucca" (16th) =

Inactive Italian Army cavalry unit

- Reggimento "Cavalleggeri di Lucca" (16°)
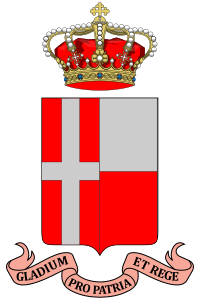
- Regimental coat of arms
- Active: 23 July 1859 — 20 May 1920; 1 March 1943 — 12 Sept. 1943
- Country: Kingdom of Italy
- Branch: Royal Italian Army
- Part of: 135th Armored Cavalry Division "Ariete"
- Motto: "Gladium pro Patria et Rege"
- Anniversaries: 6 August 1918 - Battle of Sheq Marinas

Insignia
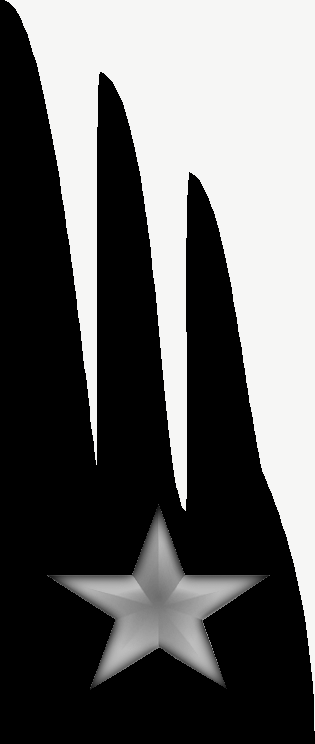
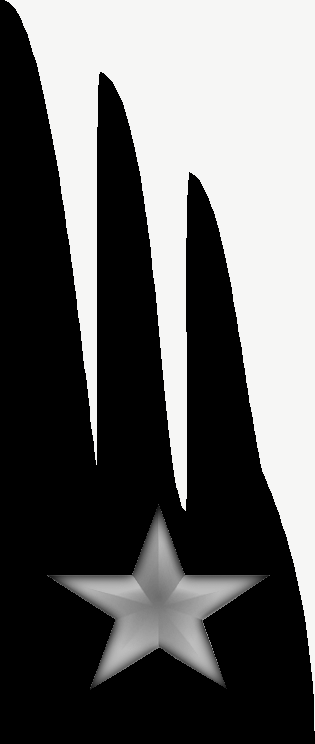
- Regimental gorget patches

The Regiment "Cavalleggeri di Lucca" (16th) (Italian: Reggimento "Cavalleggeri di Lucca" (16°) - "Chevau-légers of Lucca") is an inactive cavalry unit of the Italian Army named for the city of Lucca in Tuscany. The regiment was formed shortly after the Second Italian War of Independence by the Provisional Government of Tuscany of the Grand Duchy of Tuscany. In 1860, the regiment was incorporated into the Royal Sardinian Army. In 1866, the regiment fought in the Third Italian War of Independence. In 1912-14, the regiment was deployed to Libya for the Italo-Turkish War. In World War I the regiment fought on the Italian front, the Albanian front, and the Macedonian front. After the war the regiment was disbanded and its traditions assigned to the Regiment "Cavalleggeri Guide".

In 1943, the regiment was reformed as motorized unit and assigned to the 135th Armored Cavalry Division "Ariete". After the announcement of the Armistice of Cassibile on 8 September 1943 the regiment fought against German forces, which tried to occupy Rome. On 12 September 1943, the regiment was disbanded by the victorious Germans. The regiment's anniversary falls on 6 August 1918, the day the regiment fought against Austro-Hungarian Army forces at Sheq Marinas in Albania. As the regiment is a Chevau-léger unit, its enlisted personnel is addressed as "Chevau-léger" (Italian: Cavalleggero).

== History ==
=== Italian Wars of Independence ===
==== Second Italian War of Independence ====
On 21 July 1858, French Emperor Napoleon III and the Prime Minister of Sardinia Camillo Benso, Count of Cavour met in Plombières and reached a secret verbal agreement on a military alliance between the French Empire and the Kingdom of Sardinia against the Austrian Empire. On 26 January 1859, Napoleon III signed the Franco-Sardinian Treaty, followed by King Victor Emmanuel II on 29 January 1859. On 9 March 1859, Sardinia mobilized its army, followed by Austria on 9 April. On 23 April, Austria delivered an ultimatum to Sardinia demanding its demobilization. Upon Sardinia's refusal, Austria declared war on 26 April and three days later the Austrians crossed the Ticino river into Piedmont. Consequently, France honored its alliance with Sardinia and declared war on Austria on 3 May 1859.

On 27 April 1859, Leopold II, Grand Duke of Tuscany refused popular demands to join the war against Austria, which led to an uprising in Florence, the capital of the Grand Duchy of Tuscany. As the Tuscan Army sided with the people, Leopold II fled the same day to the Austrian garrison in Bologna in the Papal Legations of the Romagne. The evening of the same day, 27 April 1859, the city council of Florence formed the Provisional Government of Tuscany, which was led by Ubaldino Peruzzi, Vincenzo Malenchini, and Alessandro Danzini. The next day Victor Emmanuel II nominated the Sardinian ambassador in Florence Carlo Bon Compagni di Mombello as new head of state of the Grand Duchy.

On 23 May 1859, the 5th French Corps landed in Livorno and on 29 May the Grand Duchy of Tuscany joined the Franco-Sardinian alliance against Austria. On 12 July 1859, the Second Italian War of Independence ended with the Armistice of Villafranca, which called for the rulers of the Grand Duchy of Tuscany, the Duchy of Modena and Reggio, and the Duchy of Parma and Piacenza, which all had fled their nations, to be restored to their thrones. However neither Sardinia nor the Sardinian installed governments in the three nations wished for a return of the rulers. On 23 July 1859, the Tuscan National Assembly ordered to form a Tuscan Chevau-légers Division (Italian: Divisione Cavalleggeri Toscani). On 14 November 1859, the division was renamed Regiment "Cavalleggeri di Lucca". The regiment was based in Pisa and consisted of a staff, and two squadrons. Each squadron fielded five officers and 120 Chevau-légers, while the staff consisted of twelve officers and non-commissioned officers.

On 8 December 1859 the Grand Duchy of Tuscany, Duchy of Parma, Duchy of Modena and the Papal Legations were merged into the United Provinces of Central Italy. On 11 and 12 March 1860, the Royal Provinces of Emilia and the Grand Duchy of Tuscany voted in a plebiscite for annexation by the Kingdom of Sardinia. On 18 March 1860, the annexation act was presented to King Victor Emmanuel II and one week later, on 25 March 1860, the Regiment "Cavalleggeri di Lucca" and the other Tuscan cavalry regiment, the Regiment "Cavalleggeri di Firenze", were incorporated into the Royal Sardinian Army. As one of the Royal Sardinian Army's light cavalry regiments, the regiment's troops were armed with musket, pistol, and sabre. However already on 6 June 1860, the Sardinian War Ministry ordered that the army's light cavalry regiments would be equipped henceforth only with sabre and pistol.

==== Third Italian War of Independence ====
In 1862, the regiment operated in the area of Cerignola and Stornarella in southern Italy to suppress the anti-Sardinian revolt, which had erupted after the Kingdom of Sardinia had annexed the Kingdom of the Two Sicilies. In 1864, the regiment operated in the area of San Fele and Rapolla against the rebels. Overall the regiment lost 25 troops in combat in the South. On 16 February of the same year, the regiment ceded its 2nd Squadron to help form the Regiment "Cavalleggeri di Caserta". In 1866, during the Third Italian War of Independence, the regiment formed, together with the Regiment "Lancieri di Aosta" and the Guides Regiment, the Cavalry Brigade of the I Corps of the Army of the Mincio, which operated along the Mincio river. On 24 June 1866, the I Corps fought in the Battle of Custoza.

On 10 September 1871, the regiment was renamed 16th Cavalry Regiment (Lucca) and, on 5 November 1876, Cavalry Regiment "Lucca" (16th). On 1 October 1883, the regiment ceded its 6th Squadron to help form the Cavalry Regiment "Padova" (21st). In 1887, the regiment provided personnel and horses for the formation of the 1st Africa Cavalry Squadron and the Mounted Hunters Squadron, which fought in the Italo-Ethiopian War of 1887–1889. On 1 November of the same year, the regiment ceded one of its squadrons to help form the Cavalry Regiment "Umberto I" (23rd). In 1895-96, the regiment provided one officer and 71 enlisted for units deployed to Italian Eritrea for the First Italo-Ethiopian War. On 16 December 1897, the regiment was renamed Regiment "Cavalleggeri di Lucca" (16th). On 1 October 1909, the regiment ceded its 3rd Squadron to help form the Regiment "Cavalleggeri di Treviso" (28th). In 1903, one of the regiment's platoons was sent to Tianjin in China to garrison the Italian concession of Tianjin, which had been ceded by China to Italy after the Eight-Nation Alliance's intervention in China during the Boxer Rebellion.

=== Italo-Turkish War ===
In January 1912, the regiment's command was deployed, together with the regiment's 2nd and 3rd squadrons, to Benghazi in Libya for the Italo-Turkish War. In Benghazi the regiment incorporated two squadrons of the Regiment "Cavalleggeri di Piacenza" (18th), which had arrived in the city in November 1911. On 1 May 1912, the regiment fought in the Battle of Due Palme and later in the same year in the Battle of Al Qawarishah. On 27 June 1912, the regiment's depot in Saluzzo formed 6th Squadron and 7th Squadron, which were sent to Libya as reinforcements for the regiment. In 1914, the regiment's command, 2nd Squadron, and 3rd Squadron were repatriated. The 6th and 7th squadrons remained in Libya until January 1915, when the two squadrons were repatriated and moved to Palermo, as the Regiment "Cavalleggeri di Lucca" (16th) did not have space for them at its base in Saluzzo. In Palermo the 6th Squadron and 7th Squadron formed a group, which, on 29 April 1915, joined the newly formed Regiment "Cavalleggeri di Palermo" (30th) as that regiment's second group.

=== World War I ===
At the outbreak of World War I the regiment consisted of a command, a depot, and two cavalry groups, with the I Group consisting of three squadrons and the II Group consisting of two squadrons and a machine gun section. On 24 May 1915, the day Italy entered the war, the regiment was assigned to the II Army Corps. Unlike the cavalry regiments, which were assigned to the army's 1st and 4th cavalry divisions, the Regiment "Cavalleggeri di Lucca" (16th) was not dismounted for the war. In April 1916, the regiment's 1st Squadron was dismounted and attached to the Regiment "Cavalleggeri di Treviso" (28th), with which the squadron served in the trenches at Monfalcone at the foot of the Karst plateau on the Italian front. In August 1916, the two squadrons of the Regiment "Cavalleggeri di Lucca" (16th) were assigned to a provisional cavalry brigade, which fought in the Sixth Battle of the Isonzo and was the first Italian unit to enter the conquered city of Gorizia.

In December 1916, the regiment's I Group was assigned to the Italian 35th Division, which consisted of the Brigade "Sicilia" and the Brigade "Cagliari". The 35th Division was sent to the Macedonian front, where it arrived towards the end of the Monastir offensive, during which the Allied Army of the Orient pushed the Imperial German Army and Bulgarian Army North into Macedonia. In February 1917, the regiment's II Group was sent to the Principality of Albania, where the Italian XVI Corps had established a front along the Vjosa river in Southern Albania to protect the important port of Vlorë from the Austro-Hungarians, which had occupied the rest of Albania.

In 1917, the regiment's depot in Saluzzo formed the 1499th Dismounted Machine Gunners Company as reinforcement for the regiment. In March 1918, the regiment's command was sent to Albania, where it took command of the II Group. The front in southern Albania remained static until July 1918, when the Italian forces went on the offensive to push the Austro-Hungarian troops beyond the Seman river. On 7 July 1918, Italian forces crossed the Vjosa river and attacked towards Mallakastër and Fier. The Austro-Hungarian troops fell back and on 9 July Italian forces reached the Seman river. After a short break the Italian units fell back to the hills South of the river, where they defeated a series of Austro-Hungarian counterattacks. On 6 August 1918, the Regiment "Cavalleggeri di Lucca" (16th) distinguished itself in combat at Sheq Marinas against the Austro-Hungarian forces.

On 15 September 1918, the Allied Army of the Orient began the Vardar offensive on the Macedonian front. During the offensive, the regiment's I Group advanced to Prilep in Macedonia and from there to Skopje. On 29 September, Bulgaria signed the Armistice of Salonica and the next day at noon, the Bulgarian Army surrendered. The I Group then rode to Kumanovo and from there to Kyustendil in Bulgaria. On 15 October 1918, the I Group entered, together with other allied forces, Bulgaria's capital Sofia. With the Bulgarian surrender, the Austro-Hungarian position in Albania became untenable and consequently, in early October 1918, Italian units observed large fires along the entire Austro-Hungarian line. Italian patrols sent forward to reconnoiter, reported that the Austro-Hungarian forces had burned their supplies and fled Albania. Italian cavalry units were sent to pursue the fleeing Austro-Hungarians and the II Group of the Regiment "Cavalleggeri di Lucca" (16th) advanced to Durrës and Lezhë, and on 4 November the group arrived in Bar in Montenegro.

=== Interwar years ===
In December 1918, the I Group in Sofia was attached to the Regiment "Cavalleggeri di Lodi" (15th). On 31 January 1919, the command of the Regiment "Cavalleggeri di Lucca" (16th) and the II Group embarked in Vlorë in Albania and were repatriated, while the I Group remained in Sofia in Bulgaria. In 1919, the Royal Italian Army disbanded the second groups of all thirty cavalry regiments, while the first groups were reduced to two squadrons. On 21 November 1919, 14 cavalry regiments were disbanded and their groups transferred to 14 of the remaining cavalry regiments. One of the disbanded regiments was the Regiment "Cavalleggeri di Padova" (21st), whose group was renamed II Squadrons Group "Cavalleggeri di Padova". Afterwards, the squadrons group, which remained based in Verona and retained the disbanded regiment's standard, joined the Regiment "Cavalleggeri di Lucca" (16th).

On 20 May 1920, the Royal Italian Army reformed the Regiment "Cavalleggeri Guide" and disbanded five additional cavalry regiments, among them the Regiment "Cavalleggeri di Lucca" (16th). On the same day, the II Squadrons Group "Cavalleggeri di Padova" and that group's 4th Squadron were disbanded, while the group's 3rd Squadron was transferred to the Regiment "Cavalleggeri di Monferrato" (13th). During the same month, May 1920, the regiment's I Squadrons Group left Bulgaria and returned to Italy, where the squadrons group joined the Regiment "Cavalleggeri Guide". On 1 July 1920, the traditions and standards of the Regiment "Cavalleggeri di Lucca" (16th) and the Regiment "Cavalleggeri di Padova" (21st) were entrusted to the Regiment "Cavalleggeri Guide". On 24 May 1925, the standards of the two disbanded regiments were transferred to the Shrine of the Flags, which at the time was located in Castel Sant'Angelo, for safekeeping.

=== World War II ===
On 1 March 1943, the regiment was reformed in Bologna by the depot of the Armored Regiment "Vittorio Emanuele II" as Motorized Regiment "Cavalleggeri di Lucca". The reformed regiment consisted of the following units:

- Motorized Regiment "Cavalleggeri di Lucca"
  - Command Squadron
    - Command Platoon
    - 2 × Cannon platoons, each with 2 × 20/65 mod. 35 anti-aircraft guns
  - Motorcyclists Squadron
    - Command Platoon
    - 2 × Motorcyclist platoons
    - Motorcyclists Machine Gunners Platoon
    - Armored Car Platoon, with 4 × AB41 armored cars
  - Self-propelled Squadron
    - Command Platoon
    - 3 × Self-propelled platoons, each with 4 × Semovente da 75/18 self-propelled guns
  - Transport Unit
    - Command Section
    - 3 × Heavy transport sections
  - 3 × Dismounted groups, each of which consisted of:
    - Group Command
    - 2 × Truck-transported squadrons, each of which consisted of:
      - Command Squad
      - 2 × Chevau-léger platoons
      - Machine Gunners Platoon
    - Support Weapons and Anti-aircraft Squadron
      - Command Squad
      - Self-propelled Platoon, with 4 × Semovente da 75/18 self-propelled guns
      - 2 × Cannon platoons, each with 2 × 20/65 mod. 35 anti-aircraft guns mounted on trucks
    - Mortar Squadron
      - Command Platoon
      - 3 × Mortar platoons, each with 3 × 81mm mod. 35 mortars

The regiment fielded 92 officers, 127 non-commissioned officers, 1,611 enlisted men, 293 drivers, and one military chaplain. The equipment of the regiment included 4 AB41 armored cars, 24 75/18 self-propelled guns, 16 20/65 anti-aircraft guns, and 27 81mm mod. 35 mortars.

On 1 April 1943, the regiment was assigned to the newly formed 135th Armored Cavalry Division "Ariete", which also included the Armored Reconnaissance Grouping "Lancieri di Montebello", Armored Regiment "Vittorio Emanuele II", 135th Armored Artillery Regiment "Ariete", and 235th Self-propelled Anti-tank Artillery Regiment "Ariete". The "Ariete" division remained in the Emilia region until August 1943, when it was sent to Rome after the fall of the fascist regime of Benito Mussolini on 26 July 1943. The division was assigned to the Motorized-Armored Army Corps and tasked with defense of the northern approaches to Rome on both sides of Lake Bracciano in the towns of Monterosi and Manziana.

In the evening of 8 September 1943, the Armistice of Cassibile, which ended hostilities between the Kingdom of Italy and the Anglo-American Allies, was announced by General Dwight D. Eisenhower on Radio Algiers and by Marshal Pietro Badoglio on Italian radio. At the time, "Ariete" division's strength was 8,500 men, with 176 working tanks and armored vehicles, about 70 cannons and 92 20mm anti-aircraft guns. Germany reacted by invading Italy and the next day, on 9 September 1943, the "Ariete" division successfully blocked the advance of the German 3rd Panzergrenadier Division and elements of the German 26th Panzer Division. In Monterosi the German vanguard was blocked by the division's mixed engineer battalion, which was supported by the Motorized Regiment "Cavalleggeri di Lucca" and the III Group of the 135th Armored Artillery Regiment "Ariete" with 149/19 heavy howitzers. The fighting cost the Motorized Regiment "Cavalleggeri di Lucca" 33 killed and 192 wounded.

After the flight of King Victor Emmanuel III and his government from Rome, the division was ordered on 10 September to abandon the defense of the city and move to Tivoli further East. The division's commander General Raffaele Cadorna did as ordered, but dispatched the lancers of the Armored Reconnaissance Grouping "Lancieri di Montebello" to the South of Rome to assist the 12th Infantry Division "Sassari" and 21st Infantry Division "Granatieri di Sardegna", which continued to defend the city. The next day, on 11 September 1943, General Cadorna ordered to hide the standards and flags of the "Ariete" division's units, and then went into hiding in Rome, where he joined the Clandestine Military Front of Colonel Giuseppe Cordero Lanza di Montezemolo to fight the German occupiers. On 12 September 1943, the officers of the Motorized Regiment "Cavalleggeri di Lucca" disbanded the regiment.
