= Dardano Fenulli =

Italian general (1889–1944)

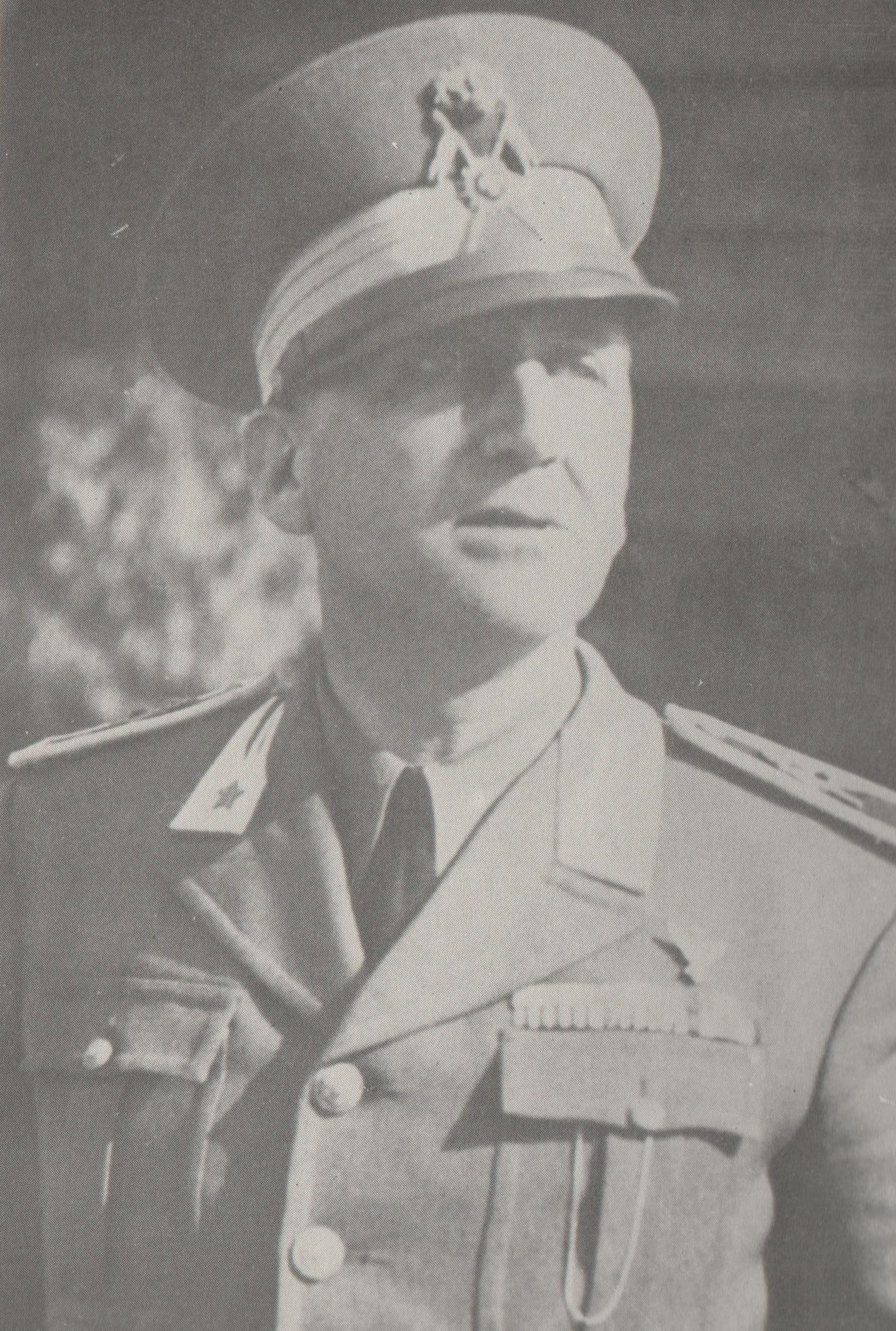
- Born: 3 August 1889; Reggio Emilia, Kingdom of Italy
- Died: 24 March 1944 (aged 54); Rome, Italian Social Republic
- Military career
- Allegiance: Kingdom of Italy
- Branch: Royal Italian Army
- Service years: 1906–1944
- Rank: Brigadier general
- Commands: "Lancieri di Vittorio Emanuele" Cavalry Regiment; 5th Armored Brigade "Ariete"
- Conflicts: Italo-Turkish War; World War I; Second Italo-Ethiopian War; World War II; Axis invasion of Yugoslavia; Operation Achse
- Awards: Gold Medal of Military Valour (posthumous); Silver Medal of Military Valor; War Merit Cross (three times)

Dardano Fenulli (3 August 1889 – 24 March 1944) was an Italian general during World War II.

== Biography ==
The son of Army officer Saverio Fenulli and of Rosa Ferrari, in 1906 he enlisted as a volunteer in the "Lancers of Milan" Cavalry Regiment, and later attended the Military Academy of Modena, graduating in 1912 with the rank of cavalry lieutenant. In the same year, his father was killed in action in Derna during the Italo-Turkish War, while leading a bayonet charge, being posthumously awarded the Silver Medal of Military Valor. Dardano Fenulli was instead assigned to the "Cavalleggeri di Lucca" Cavalry Regiment, and left for Tripolitania where he participated in the final stages of the war.

During the First World War he fought on Cima Bocche and the Colbricon, in the Lagorai mountains; he lost his brother, also named Saverio, killed in action on the Karst Plateau during the Tenth Battle of the Isonzo. After the end of the war he was assigned to the "Nizza Cavalleria" Regiment with the rank of captain. From 1936 to 1939, with the rank of lieutenant colonel, he participated in the Second Italo-Ethiopian War and then in counterguerrilla operations in Ethiopia, being awarded a silver medal for military valor. In 1940 he was attached to the Ministry of Italian Africa and in April 1940, after promotion to colonel, he was given command of the "Lancers of Vittorio Emanuele" Regiment, participating in the Axis invasion of Yugoslavia in April 1941 and in the subsequent occupation until 1942. In 1943 he was promoted to brigadier general and appointed deputy commander of the 135th Armored Division "Ariete II" (having briefly served as commander of the 5th Armored Brigade "Ariete" from which the new Ariete Division was formed).

In the days following the proclamation of the Armistice of Cassibile on September 8, 1943, he participated in the fighting against the Germans near Rome, leading an armoured column near Ciampino (with the task of outflanking position held by the 2nd Fallschirmjäger Division), but the signing of the ceasefire on 10 September halted all military operations, and all Italian troops were disarmed and interned. Fenulli went into hiding and joined the Roman Resistance, becoming one of the leaders of the Clandestine Military Front and helping form and organize armed bands both within and outside the city. Betrayed by an informer, he was arrested by the Germans in February 1944, and after a period of detention and torture in the SS prison in Via Tasso, he was executed in the Fosse Ardeatine massacre on March 24, 1944. He was posthumously awarded the Gold Medal of Military Valor. In the last letter written before execution, he wrote:

New generations will have to feel towards Italy the feeling that our great heroes of the Risorgimento would have liked to remain unknown to us in the future: «the feeling of the painful, passionate and jealous love with which one loves a fallen and enslaved fatherland, which no longer exists except in the secret cult of the heart and in an invincible hope». This is where the present situation of this disastrous war has led us. Thus the dream that had come true and now vanished is reawakened: we hope to see Italy powerful without threat, rich without corruption, excelling, as before, in sciences and arts, in all civil industriousness, safe and fruitful of every good in its renewed national life. May God want this dream to come true.
