= Vito Artale =

Italian general

- Born: 3 March 1882; Palermo, Kingdom of Italy
- Died: 24 March 1944 (aged 62); Rome, Italian Social Republic
- Military career
- Allegiance: Kingdom of Italy
- Branch: Royal Italian Army
- Service years: 1905–1944
- Rank: Lieutenant general
- Conflicts: Italo-Turkish War; World War I; Second Battle of the Piave River; World War II
- Awards: Gold Medal of Military Valour (posthumous); Bronze Medal of Military Valor; War Cross for Military Valor

Vito Artale (3 March 1882 – 24 March 1944) was an Italian general during World War II.

== Biography ==
He was admitted to the Royal Academy of Turin in 1902 and graduated in 1905 as artillery second lieutenant; in September 1908, with the rank of lieutenant, he was assigned to the 3rd Fortress Artillery Regiment. He participated in the Italo-Turkish War (where he earned a Bronze Medal of Military Valor for his role in the capture of Sidi Said in July 1912), after which he was appointed military attaché at the Italian Embassy in Berlin. He participated in the First World War with the rank of captain and later major (from 1917), being assigned in 1917 to the Garda-Mincio Defense Command and subsequently commanding the 122nd and 167th Siege Artillery Groups, the Volunteer Corps Siege Artillery Group and the II Group of the 35th Field Artillery Regiment; in June 1918 he was awarded a War Cross of Military Valor for his role in the Second Battle of the Piave River. He then became a member of the control commission of the 8th Army for the execution of the armistice.

In September 1926, Artale was promoted to lieutenant colonel and given command of the 11th Anti-Aircraft Center; having then been transferred to the technical service of artillery, he was appointed deputy director of the Terni arms factory (1929), of the fuse factory of Rome, and finally deputy director and then director of the Army precision laboratory. In 1937, with the rank of colonel, Artale was placed in charge of the Army optical glass factory, remaining there even after promotion to major general in 1938 and to lieutenant general in 1939. Having been transferred to the Army reserve in March 1940, he was retained in active service because he was recognized as indispensable to the special service he was assigned to; he continued directing the Army optical glass factory during most of World War II.

After the Armistice of Cassibile and the German occupation of Rome in September 1943, Artale joined the Resistance, becoming part of the Clandestine Military Front. He had the plants of the Army glass factory sabotaged, for which he was arrested by the Gestapo on 9 December 1943; after three months of imprisonment and torture, he was executed in the Fosse Ardeatine massacre on 24 March 1944. He was posthumously awarded the Gold Medal of Military Valor.
