= Regiment "Cavalleggeri di Palermo" (30th) =

Inactive Italian Army cavalry unit

- Reggimento "Cavalleggeri di Palermo" (30°)
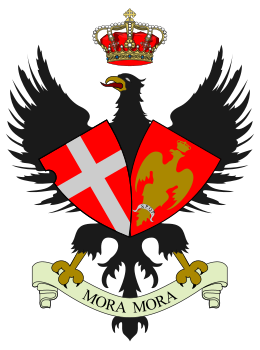
- Regimental coat of arms
- Active: 29 April 1915 — 21 Nov. 1919; 1938 — July 1943
- Country: Kingdom of Italy
- Branch: Royal Italian Army
- Garrison/HQ: Palermo
- Motto: "Mora Mora"
- Anniversaries: 28 July 1918 - Battle of Kuç
- Decorations: 1× Bronze Medal of Military Valor

Insignia
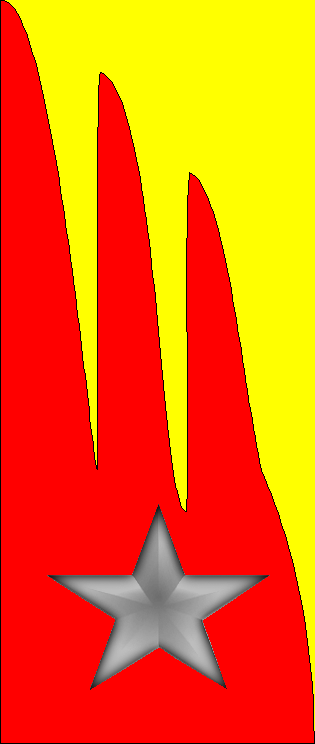
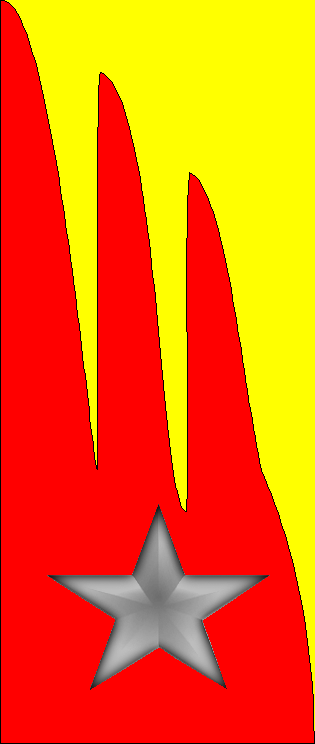
- Regimental gorget patches

The Regiment "Cavalleggeri di Palermo (30th)" (Italian: Reggimento "Cavalleggeri di Palermo" (30°) - "Chevau-légers of Palermo") is an inactive cavalry unit of the Italian Army named for the city of Palermo in Sicily. The regiment is the Italian Army's youngest cavalry regiment and was based throughout its existence in Palermo in Sicily. Shortly before Italy's entry into World War I, the Royal Italian Army formed the Regiment "Cavalleggeri di Palermo" (30th) in Palermo. During World War I the regiment fought on the Italian front and the Albanian front. In 1919, after the war's end, the regiment was disbanded and its traditions assigned to the Regiment "Lancieri di Firenze".

In 1936, the Royal Italian Army formed the Squadron "Cavalleggeri di Sicilia" in Palermo, which received the gorget patches and cap badge of the Regiment "Cavalleggeri di Palermo (30th). In 1938, the Squadron "Cavalleggeri di Sicilia" was disbanded and its personnel used to help reform the Regiment "Lancieri di Milano" in Civitavecchia. Subsequently, the Squadrons Group "Cavalleggeri di Palermo" was formed in Palermo, which was assigned the gorget patches and cap badge of the Regiment "Cavalleggeri di Palermo (30th). During World War II the Cavalry Mobilization Depot in Caltanissetta formed five dismounted groups, which received the name, gorget patches and cap badge of the Regiment "Cavalleggeri di Palermo" (30th). In July 1943, the I Squadrons Group "Cavalleggeri di Palermo", the depot in Caltanissetta, and two of the dismounted groups were destroyed during the Allied invasion of Sicily. The regiment's anniversary falls on 28 July 1918, the day the regiment distinguished itself in the Battle of Kuç in Albania, for which it was awarded a Bronze Medal of Military Valor. As the regiment is a Chevau-léger unit, its enlisted personnel is addressed as "Chevau-léger" (Italian: Cavalleggero).

== History ==
=== World War I ===
In 1914, the Royal Italian Army cavalry regiments "Nizza Cavalleria" (1st), "Savoia Cavalleria" (3rd), "Lancieri di Novara" (5th), "Cavalleggeri Guide" (19th), and "Cavalleggeri di Catania" (22nd) ceded some of their personnel and horses to help form a group in Palermo, which consisted of three squadrons. In January 1915, the 6th Squadron and 7th Squadron of the Regiment "Cavalleggeri di Lucca" (16th), which had been formed on 27 June 1912 for service in the Italo-Turkish War, left Libya and moved to Palermo, as the Regiment "Cavalleggeri di Lucca" (16th) had no room for the two surplus squadrons at its base in Saluzzo. In Palermo the 6th Squadron and 7th Squadron formed a second group. On 29 April 1915, the two groups entered the newly formed Regiment "Cavalleggeri di Palermo" (30th).

Soon after the regiment's formation, the 3rd Squadron was detached and sent to Libya where Italian forces were engaged in combat with local rebels. On 12 November 1915, the regiment's 2nd Squadron was disbanded and replaced by the 2nd Squadron of the Regiment "Cavalleggeri Guide" (19th), which was also stationed to Libya. By 1916, the regiment consisted of the following units:

- Regiment "Cavalleggeri di Palermo" (30th), in Palermo
  - I Group
    - 1st Squadron
    - 2nd Squadron (detached to Libya)
    - 3rd Squadron (detached to Libya)
  - II Group
    - 4th Squadron (former 6th Squadron)
    - 5th Squadron (former 7th Squadron)

On 15 May 1916, Austro-Hungarian forces began the Battle of Asiago and the following month the regiment's I Group was sent to the Asiago plateau to reinforce the crumbling Italian front. After the Battle of Asiago the I Group was sent to the Principality of Albania, where the Italian XVI Corps had established a front along the Vjosa river in southern Albania to protect the important port of Vlorë from the Austro-Hungarians, which had occupied the rest of Albania. In 1917, the regiment's depot in Palermo formed the 738th Dismounted Machine Gunners Company as reinforcement for the regiment. The front in southern Albania remained static until July 1918, when the Italian forces went on the offensive to push the Austro-Hungarian troops beyond the Seman river. On 7 July 1918, the 15th Infantry Regiment and 16th Infantry Regiment of the Brigade "Savona", the Regiment "Cavalleggeri di Catania" (22nd), the I Group of the Regiment "Cavalleggeri di Palermo" (30th), and the 19th Sardinian Squadron, crossed the Vjosa river and attacked towards Mallakastër and Fier. The Austro-Hungarian troops fell back and on 9 July Italian forces reached the Seman river. After a short break the Italian units fell back to the hills South of the river, where they defeated heavy Austro-Hungarian counterattacks on 22 and 25 August 1918.

On 15 September 1918, the Allied Army of the Orient began the Vardar offensive against the Imperial German Army and Bulgarian Army forces on the Macedonian front. On 29 September, Bulgaria signed the Armistice of Salonica and the next day at noon, the Bulgarian Army surrendered. With the Bulgarian surrender, the Austro-Hungarian position in Albania became untenable and consequently, in early October 1918, Italian units observed large fires along the entire Austro-Hungarian line. Italian patrols sent forward to reconnoiter, reported that the Austro-Hungarian forces had burned their supplies and fled Albania. Italian cavalry units were sent to pursue the fleeing Austro-Hungarians and the I Group of the Regiment "Cavalleggeri di Palermo" (30th) advanced to Durrës and Shkodër. For its conduct during the Italian offensive on the Seman river, during which the I Group had distinguished itself at Kuç, the regiment was awarded a Bronze Medal of Military Valor, which was affixed to the regiment's standard.

=== Interwar years ===
In 1919, the Regiment "Cavalleggeri di Palermo" (30th) remained in Albania, where Italy had established a protectorate. In the meantime the regiment's barracks in Palermo housed the Regiment "Cavalleggeri di Monferrato" (13th), whose base in Udine had been destroyed in November 1917 during the Battle of Caporetto. During the same year, the Royal Italian Army disbanded the second groups of all thirty cavalry regiments, while the first groups were reduced to two squadrons. On 21 November 1919, 14 cavalry regiments were disbanded and their groups transferred to 14 of the remaining cavalry regiments. One of the disbanded regiments was the Regiment "Cavalleggeri di Palermo" (30th), whose remaining group was renamed II Squadrons Group "Cavalleggeri di Palermo". Afterwards, the squadrons group, which returned to Palermo in February 1920 and retained the disbanded regiment's standard, was assigned to the Regiment "Lancieri di Firenze" (9th) in Rome.

On 20 May 1920, the Royal Italian Army disbanded five additional cavalry regiments, among them the Regiment "Cavalleggeri di Lodi" (15th), whose I Squadrons Group was transferred to the Regiment "Lancieri di Firenze" (9th). The Regiment "Lancieri di Firenze" then moved from Rome to Naples and took over the barracks of the disbanded Regiment "Cavalleggeri di Lodi" (15th). On 1 July 1920, the II Squadrons Group "Cavalleggeri di Palermo" and one its squadrons were disbanded. On the same day, the regiment's traditions and standard were entrusted to the Regiment "Lancieri di Firenze". On 24 May 1925, the standard of the Regiment "Cavalleggeri di Palermo" (30th) was transferred to the Shrine of the Flags, which at the time was located in Castel Sant'Angelo, for safekeeping.

On 15 December 1936, the Royal Italian Army formed the Squadron "Cavalleggeri di Sicilia" in Palermo, which received the gorget patches and cap badge of the Regiment "Cavalleggeri di Palermo" (30th). The squadron was assigned to the XII Army Corps and consisted of a command, a command platoon, three mounted squadrons, and a machine gunners platoon. In March 1938, the Squadron "Cavalleggeri di Sicilia" was disbanded and its personnel used to help reform the Regiment "Lancieri di Milano" in Civitavecchia. In 1938, as replacement for the Squadron "Cavalleggeri di Sicilia", the Squadrons Group "Cavalleggeri di Palermo" was formed in Palermo. The squadrons group received the gorget patches and cap badge of the Regiment "Cavalleggeri di Palermo (30th) and assigned to the XII Army Corps.

=== World War II ===
Upon Italy's entry into World War II, the Squadrons Group "Cavalleggeri di Palermo" was mobilized as I Squadrons Group "Cavalleggeri di Palermo". On 24 October 1940, the squadrons group was demobilized and its personnel released. On 16 January 1941, the I Squadrons Group "Cavalleggeri di Palermo" was mobilized once more with newly drafted personnel. The squadrons group was assigned to the XVI Army Corps, which was responsible for the defense of Sicily to the East of a line from Cefalù to Gela.

Between Italy's entry into the war and 1943 the Cavalry Mobilization Depot in Caltanissetta formed the following units with cavalry recruits and reservists from Sicily:

- XV Dismounted Group "Cavalleggeri di Palermo", formed in 1940
- LX Dismounted Group "Cavalleggeri di Palermo", formed in 1940
- XXII Dismounted Group "Cavalleggeri di Palermo", formed in 1941
- XXIII Dismounted Group "Cavalleggeri di Palermo", formed in 1941
- XXX Coastal Group "Cavalleggeri di Palermo", formed in 1943

The XV Dismounted Group "Cavalleggeri di Palermo" was sent to southern Calabria, where the group was assigned to the 143rd Coastal Infantry Regiment of the 211th Coastal Division, which surrendered to British forces after the announcement of the Armistice of Cassibile on 8 September 1943. The LX Dismounted Group "Cavalleggeri di Palermo" was sent in October 1941 to Friuli, where the group guarded military objects around Chiusaforte. The group was disbanded by invading German forces after the announcement of the Armistice of Cassibile. The XXII Dismounted Group "Cavalleggeri di Palermo" was sent to southern Apulia and assigned to the Maritime Military Base Taranto, which surrendered to British forces after the announcement of the Armistice of Cassibile.

The I Squadrons Group "Cavalleggeri di Palermo", XXIII Dismounted Group "Cavalleggeri di Palermo", and XXX Coastal Group "Cavalleggeri di Palermo" remained in Sicily. On 10 July 1943, the day Allied forces landed on Sicily, the I Squadrons Group "Cavalleggeri di Palermo" was assigned to the Tactical Group "Campobello-Ravanusa", which was attached to the 207th Coastal Division and deployed between Campobello di Licata and Ravanusa, while the XXIII Dismounted Group "Cavalleggeri di Palermo" was assigned to the Maritime Military Base Messina-Reggio Calabria, and the XXX Coastal Group "Cavalleggeri di Palermo" was assigned to the XXIX Coastal Brigade, which was tasked with the defense of Palermo. In the morning of 10 July, the Tactical Group "Campobello-Ravanusa" was ordered to advance to Licata, where the American 3rd Infantry Division had landed. After encountering American armored forces the Tactical Group, which lacked anti-tank weapons, retreated towards Caltanissetta, with the I Squadrons Group "Cavalleggeri di Palermo" forming the rearguard. The Italian forces then slowly retreated towards Messina, from where the remnants of the Italian and German forces, which had suffered heavy losses during the Sicilian campaign, were ferried to Reggio Calabria on the Italian mainland. At the end of July the three groups of the "Cavalleggeri di Palermo" were disbanded and their remaining personnel transferred to other units.
