= Regiment "Lancieri di Montebello" (8th) =

Active Italian Army lancer unit

- Reggimento "Lancieri di Montebello" (8°)
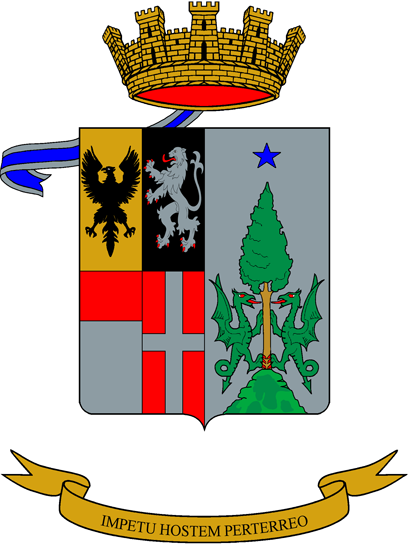
- Regimental coat of arms
- Active: 16 Sept. 1859 — 20 May 1920; 15 July 1942 — 16 Sept. 1943; 1 May 1951 — today
- Country: Italy
- Branch: Italian Army
- Part of: Mechanized Brigade "Granatieri di Sardegna"
- Garrison/HQ: Rome
- Motto: "Impetu hostem perterreo"
- Anniversaries: 15 September 1943 - Defense of Porta San Paolo
- Decorations: 1× Silver Medal of Military Valor; 1× Gold Cross of Army Merit

Insignia
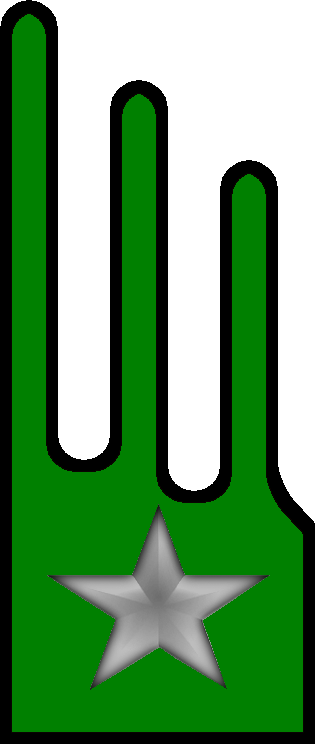
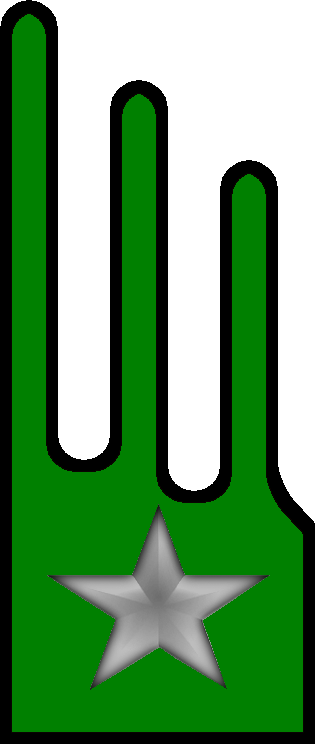
- Regimental gorget patches

The Regiment "Lancieri di Montebello" (8th) (Italian: Reggimento "Lancieri di Montebello" (8°) - "Lancers of Montebello") is a cavalry unit of the Italian Army based in Rome. The regiment is the reconnaissance unit of the Mechanized Brigade "Granatieri di Sardegna" and performs guard and public duties in Rome. In September 1859, after being victorious in the Second Italian War of Independence, the Royal Sardinian Army formed three new cavalry regiments, among them the Regiment "Cavalleggeri di Montebello", which was named for the Battle of Montebello, that had been fought on 20 May of the same year. Thus the regiment became the only Italian Army cavalry regiment named for a battle. In June 1860, the regiment was renamed Regiment "Lancieri di Montebello". In 1866, the regiment fought in the Third Italian War of Independence. In World War I the regiment's squadrons fought on the Italian front. After the war the regiment was disbanded.

During World War II the regiment was reformed as Armored Reconnaissance Grouping "Lancieri di Montebello". After the announcement of the Armistice of Cassibile on 8 September 1943, the grouping fought in the defence of Rome against the invading German forces. On 10 September 1943, the grouping, together with the 21st Infantry Division "Granatieri di Sardegna" and civilian volunteers, fought a last stand at the Porta San Paolo, for which the regiment was awarded a Silver Medal of Military Valor. On 16 September, due to the hopeless situation, the grouping's commanding officer ordered the grouping to dissolve. In 1950, during the Cold War, the Italian Army formed the Squadrons Group "Lancieri di Montebello" in Rome, which was given the name and traditions of the regiment. In 1951, the squadrons group was expanded to 8th Armored Cavalry Regiment "Lancieri di Montebello" and equipped with M47 Patton tanks. In 1975, the regiment was disbanded and its name, traditions and standard were assigned to the 8th Armored Squadrons Group "Lancieri di Montebello". In 1979, the squadrons group was reorganized as 8th Mechanized Squadrons Group "Lancieri di Montebello". In 1992, the squadrons group lost its autonomy and entered the reformed Regiment "Lancieri di Montebello" (8th). In 1997, the regiment was assigned to the Mechanized Brigade "Granatieri di Sardegna" as the brigade's reconnaissance unit. In March 2004, the regiment formed the Horse Squadrons Group to perform mounted public duties in Rome.

The regiment's anniversary falls on 15 September 1943, the day the Armored Reconnaissance Grouping "Lancieri di Montebello" ceased its week-long resistance against the German forces attacking Rome. As the regiment is a lancer unit, its enlisted personnel is addressed as "Lancer" (Italian: Lanciere).

== History ==
=== Italian Wars of Independence ===
==== Second Italian War of Independence ====
On 21 July 1858, French Emperor Napoleon III and the Prime Minister of Sardinia Camillo Benso, Count of Cavour met in Plombières and reached a secret verbal agreement on a military alliance between the French Empire and the Kingdom of Sardinia against the Austrian Empire. On 26 January 1859, Napoleon III signed the Franco-Sardinian Treaty, followed by King Victor Emmanuel II on 29 January 1859. On 9 March 1859, Sardinia mobilized its army, followed by Austria on 9 April. On 23 April, Austria delivered an ultimatum to Sardinia demanding its demobilization. Upon Sardinia's refusal, Austria declared war on 26 April and three days later the Austrians crossed the Ticino river into Piedmont. Consequently, France honored its alliance with Sardinia and declared war on Austria on 3 May 1859, which led to the Second Italian War of Independence. On 24 June 1859, the three armies met in the Battle of Solferino. On 11 July 1859, Emperor Napoleon III and Emperor Franz Joseph I met at Villafranca and concluded the Armistice of Villafranca, which transferred Lombardy, then part of the Kingdom of Lombardy–Venetia, from Austria to France. France and Sardinian would then exchange Lombardy for the Duchy of Savoy and the County of Nice.

After the conclusion of the armistice the French and Sardinian armies occupied Lombardy. On 16 September 1859, the nine cavalry regiments of the Royal Sardinian Army ceded each one squadron to help form three new Chevau-légers regiments: Regiment "Cavalleggeri di Milano" and Regiment "Cavalleggeri di Lodi", which were named for cities in Lombardy, and the Regiment "Cavalleggeri di Montebello", which was named for the Battle of Montebello, that had been fought on 20 May of the same year. The Regiment "Cavalleggeri di Montebello" was formed in the city of Voghera and received the squadrons ceded by the Regiment "Cavalleggeri di Novara", Regiment "Cavalleggeri di Aosta", and Regiment "Cavalleggeri di Monferrato". The three regiments had distinguished themselves in the Battle of Montebello four months earlier, and thus the new regiment was named for the battle, which makes the regiment the only Italian Army cavalry regiment named for a battle. Initially the regiment's troops were armed with musket, pistol, and sabre, but on 13 October 1859 the regiment's troops were equipped with lance, sabre and pistolone — a pistol with a shoulder stock. On 6 June 1860, the Sardinian War Ministry ordered that the army's cavalry regiments, which were equipped with lances — with the exception of the four line cavalry regiments — were to join the new Lancers speciality. Consequently, on the same day, the Regiment "Cavalleggeri di Montebello" was renamed Regiment "Lancieri di Montebello".

In 1861-64, the regiment operated in southern Italy to suppress the anti-Sardinian revolt, which had erupted after the Kingdom of Sardinia had annexed the Kingdom of the Two Sicilies. During this time the regiment was first based in the Capitanata area in Apulia and then in the city of Caserta in Campania. In fighting against the rebels the regiment lost 40 troops.

==== Third Italian War of Independence ====
On 20 June 1866, the Third Italian War of Independence between the Kingdom of Italy and the Austrian Empire began. During the war the Regiment "Lancieri di Montebello" formed, together with the Regiment "Lancieri di Milano" and Regiment "Cavalleggeri di Lodi", the I Cavalry Brigade of the IV Corps of the Army of the Po, which operated along the Po river. On 5 July 1866, the Army of the Po began the siege of the Austrian fortress at Borgoforte and during the night between 6 and 7 July the army crossed the Po river. On 11 July, the first forces of the Army of the Po entered Rovigo, which had been abandoned by the Austrians, as the Austrian forces in Italy had received the order to retreat towards the Isonzo river and the Trentino region. On 14 July, the Italian IV Corps ceded five divisions and the Italian I Corps one division to form the V Corps and VI Corps. Additionally the Italian II Corps and III Corps ceded both one division to form the VIII Corps. Afterwards the Army of the Po, which now consisted of the I, IV, V, VI, and VIII corps with a combined force of 14 divisions and six cavalry brigades, began a rapid advance through Veneto towards the Isonzo river without encountering Austrian forces.

On 10 September 1871, the regiment was renamed 8th Cavalry Regiment (Montebello), and on 5 November 1876, Cavalry Regiment "Montebello" (8th). In 1887, the regiment provided personnel and horses for the formation of the Mounted Hunters Squadron, which fought in the Italo-Ethiopian War of 1887–1889. In 1895-96, the regiment provided one officer and 69 enlisted for units deployed to Italian Eritrea for the First Italo-Ethiopian War. On 16 December 1897, the regiment was renamed Regiment "Lancieri di Montebello" (8th).

On 1 October 1909, the regiment ceded its 3rd Squadron to help form the Regiment "Lancieri di Vercelli" (26th). In 1911–12, the regiment provided 91 enlisted to units deployed for the Italo-Turkish War.

=== World War I ===
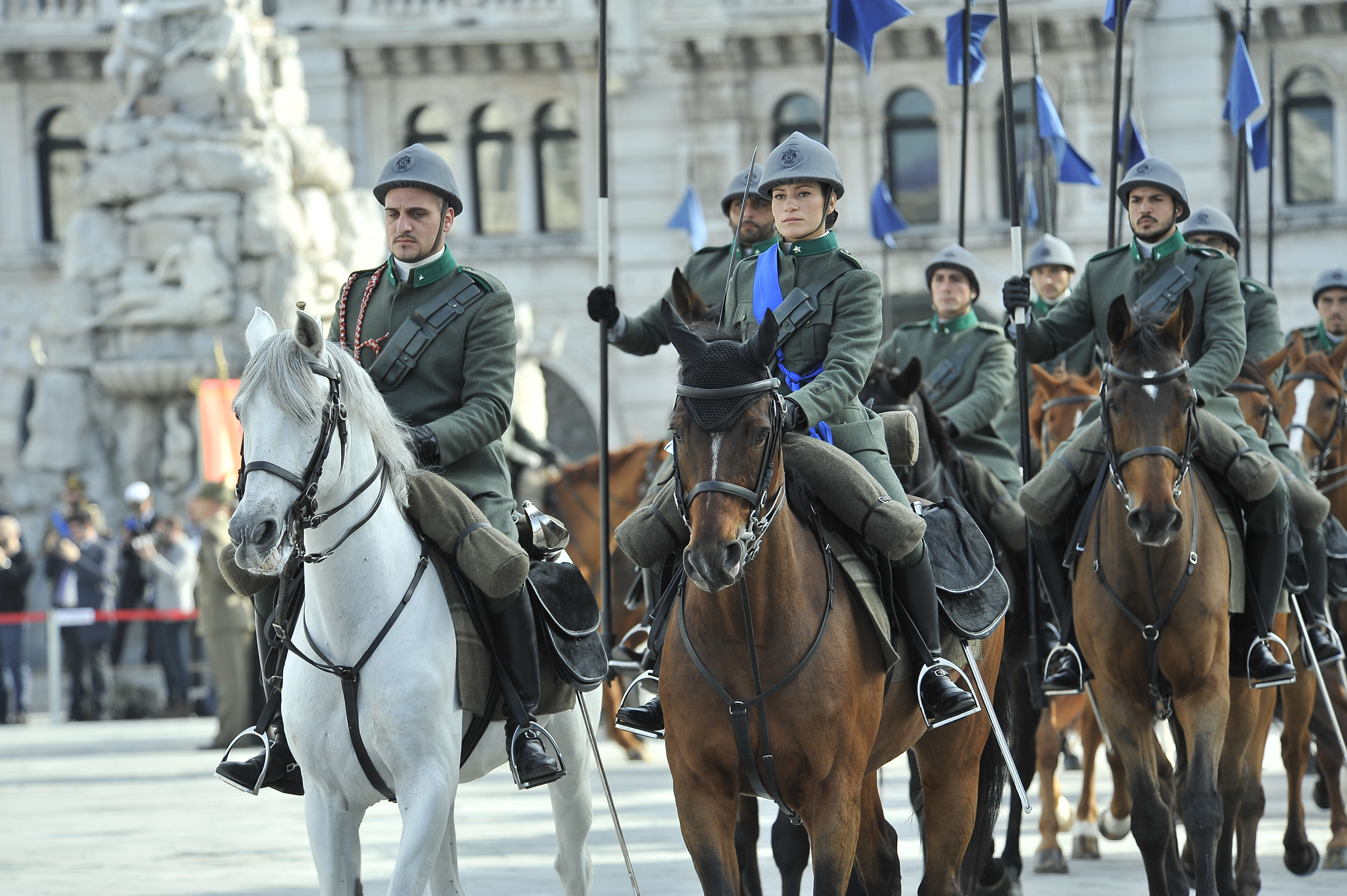
Regiment "Lancieri di Montebello" (8th) lancers in World War I uniform during a ceremony in Trieste 2018

At the outbreak of World War I the regiment consisted of a command, a depot, and two cavalry groups, with the I Group consisting of three squadrons and the II Group consisting of two squadrons and a machine gun section. Together with the Regiment "Savoia Cavalleria" (3rd) the regiment formed the VI Cavalry Brigade, which was assigned to the 3rd Cavalry Division "Lombardia". On 24 May 1915, one day after Italy had declared war against the Austro-Hungarian Empire, the VI Cavalry Brigade began to patrol the coast of the Veneto region to guard against Austro-Hungarian Army landings. In April 1916, the 3rd Cavalry Division was dismounted for service in the trenches of the Italian front, however once the Austro-Hungarian Army began the Asiago offensive the division was quickly mounted again and sent to guard the assembly of the Italian 5th Army around Vicenza.

In August 1916, after Italian forces had entered the city of Gorizia during the Sixth Battle of the Isonzo, the dismounted 3rd Cavalry Division pursued the retreating Austro-Hungarian forces along the Vipava river. In 1917, the regiment's depot in Parma formed the 860th Dismounted Machine Gunners Company as reinforcement for the regiment. On 24 October 1917, the Imperial German Army and Austro-Hungarian Army began the Battle of Caporetto and already on the first day of the battle the German 14th Army broke through the Italian lines at Kobarid. All mounted Italian cavalry regiments were sent forward to cover the retreat of the Italian 2nd Army and 3rd Army from the Isonzo front. At the time the VI Cavalry Brigade was located deep in the rear and on 31 October began its march to the front. In the morning of 5 November 1917, the brigade crossed the Cellina and Meduna rivers at Vivaro and then advanced North to attack enemy columns marching from Lestans to Sequals. However due to the strength of the enemy advance the regiment had to fall back to Roveredo in Piano, where the regiment came under heavy Austro-Hungarian air attack. On 8 November, the Regiment "Lancieri di Montebello" (8th) had retreated further and now held a line along the road from Vittorio Veneto to San Fior. In the afternoon of the same day, the regiment was reinforced by a Bersaglieri Cyclists Battalion and five Lancia 1ZM armored cars. The next day the regiment then fell back to the new Italian line along the Piave river.

On 24 October 1918, the Royal Italian Army began the Battle of Vittorio Veneto and on 30 October, the regiment, like all cavalry regiments, was ordered to pursue the retreating Austro-Hungarian armies. The next day, on 31 October, the regiment's I Group charged the Austro-Hungarian rearguards to the South of Polcenigo. Afterwards the regiment captured the bridge over the Livenza river in the center of Polcenigo. The next day, the regiment advanced through Roveredo in Piano and onward to Tauriano and Spilimbergo. On 2 November, the regiment attacked the Austro-Hungarian forces crossing the Tagliamento river at Dignano, but failed to capture the bridge, which the Austro-Hungarians blew up. The next day the regiment crossed the Tagliamento river and on 4 November 1918, the regiment arrived in Udine, where it was informed of the Armistice of Villa Giusti.

=== Interwar years ===
After the war the Royal Italian Army disbanded the second groups of all thirty cavalry regiments, while the first groups were reduced to two squadrons. On 21 November 1919, 14 cavalry regiments were disbanded and their groups transferred to 14 of the remaining cavalry regiments. One of the disbanded regiments was the Regiment "Cavalleggeri di Catania" (22nd), whose remaining group was renamed II Squadrons Group "Cavalleggeri di Catania". Afterwards, the squadrons group, which remained based in Turin and retained the disbanded regiment's standard, joined the Regiment "Lancieri di Montebello" (8th).

On 20 May 1920, the Royal Italian Army disbanded five additional cavalry regiments, among them the Regiment "Lancieri di Montebello" (8th), whose II Squadrons Group "Cavalleggeri di Catania" in Turin was transferred to the Regiment "Lancieri Vittorio Emanuele II" (10th), while the regiment's I Squadrons Group and one of that squadron group's squadrons were disbanded. The remaining squadron was transferred to the Regiment "Nizza Cavalleria" (1st), which moved from Savigliano to Turin, where it took over the barracks of the II Squadrons Group "Cavalleggeri di Catania", which as part of the reform moved to join the Regiment "Lancieri Vittorio Emanuele II" (10th) in Brescia. On 1 July 1920, the traditions and standard of the Regiment "Lancieri di Montebello" (8th) were entrusted to the Regiment "Nizza Cavalleria". On 24 May 1925, the standard of the disbanded regiment was transferred to the Shrine of the Flags, which at the time was located in Castel Sant'Angelo, for safekeeping.

=== World War II ===
On 15 July 1942, the regiment was reformed in Ferrara by the depot of the Regiment "Lancieri di Firenze" as Armored Reconnaissance Grouping "Lancieri di Montebello" (Italian: Raggruppamento Esplorante Corazzato (R.E.Co) "Lancieri di Montebello"). The reformed regiment consisted of the following units:

- Armored Reconnaissance Grouping "Lancieri di Montebello"
  - Command Squadron
  - I Group
    - Command Squadron (4 × AB41 armored cars)
    - 1st Squadron (17 × AB41 armored cars)
    - 2nd Squadron (17 × AB41 armored cars)
    - 3rd Motorcyclists Squadron
  - II Group
    - Command Squadron ( 4x Semovente da 47/32 self-propelled guns)
    - 4th Motorcyclists Squadron
    - 5th Squadron (12 × Semovente da 75/18 (on M15/42 chassis) self-propelled guns)
    - 6th Squadron (12 × Semovente da 47/32 self-propelled guns)
  - III Group (formed in summer 1943)
    - Command Squadron (4 × M15/42 tanks)
    - 7th Squadron (17 × M15/42 tanks)
    - 8th Squadron (16 × L6/40 light tanks)
    - 9th Anti-aircraft Squadron (12 × 20/65 mod. 35 anti-aircraft guns)

On 19 July 1942, the Armored Reconnaissance Grouping "Lancieri di Montebello" was assigned to the 134th Armored Division "Emanuele Filiberto Testa di Ferro". Already on 1 August 1942, the grouping was transferred to the Armored and Motorized Troops Inspectorate. On 1 April 1943, the grouping was assigned, together with the Armored Regiment "Vittorio Emanuele II", the Motorized Regiment "Cavalleggeri di Lucca", the 135th Armored Artillery Regiment "Ariete", and the 235th Self-propelled Anti-tank Artillery Regiment "Ariete", to the 135th Armored Cavalry Division "Ariete".

In the evening of 8 September 1943, the Armistice of Cassibile, which ended hostilities between the Kingdom of Italy and the Anglo-American Allies, was announced by General Dwight D. Eisenhower on Radio Algiers and by Marshal Pietro Badoglio on Italian radio. Germany reacted by invading Italy and the 12th Infantry Division "Sassari", 21st Infantry Division "Granatieri di Sardegna", and 135th Armored Cavalry Division "Ariete" were ordered to defend Rome against the Germans. On 10 September 1943, the grenadiers, the Lancieri di Montebello, remnants of the "Sassari" division, and hundreds of armed civilians fell back to a defensive line before Porta San Paolo for a last stand. Civilians at Porta San Paolo included communist leader Luigi Longo, lawyer Giuliano Vassalli, writer Emilio Lussu, union leaders Vincenzo Baldazzi and Mario Zagari, retired Air Force generals Sabato Martelli Castaldi and Roberto Lordi, and 18-year-old future partisan leader Marisa Musu. The future Italian president Sandro Pertini brought a detachment of Socialist resistance fighters to Porta San Paolo and around 12:30 the Catholic Communist movement arrived with further reinforcements, including famed actor Carlo Ninchi. However, by 17:00 the Germans broke the line of the Italian defenders, who had suffered 570 killed in the fighting, including two of the Montebello's squadrons commanders: Captain Romolo Fugazza and Captain Camillo Sabatini. Soon after the Italian military units surrendered as the flight of King Victor Emmanuel III from Rome made further resistance senseless. Before surrendering the Italian soldiers handed thousands of their weapons over to the civilian population, which was quick to form an organized resistance movement in the city. The remaining officers of the Armored Reconnaissance Grouping "Lancieri di Montebello" hid the regiment's standard and on 16 September the regiment's commanding officer dissolved the grouping.

For their conduct during the defence of the Rome the 1st Regiment "Granatieri di Sardegna" and the "Lancieri di Montebello" were both awarded a Silver Medal of Military Valor, while the 2nd Regiment "Granatieri di Sardegna" was awarded a Bronze Medal of Military Valor. Additionally the Montebello's two fallen squadron commanders, Captain Romolo Fugazza and Captain Camillo Sabatini, were both awarded Italy's highest military honor the Gold Medal of Military Valor.

=== Cold War ===
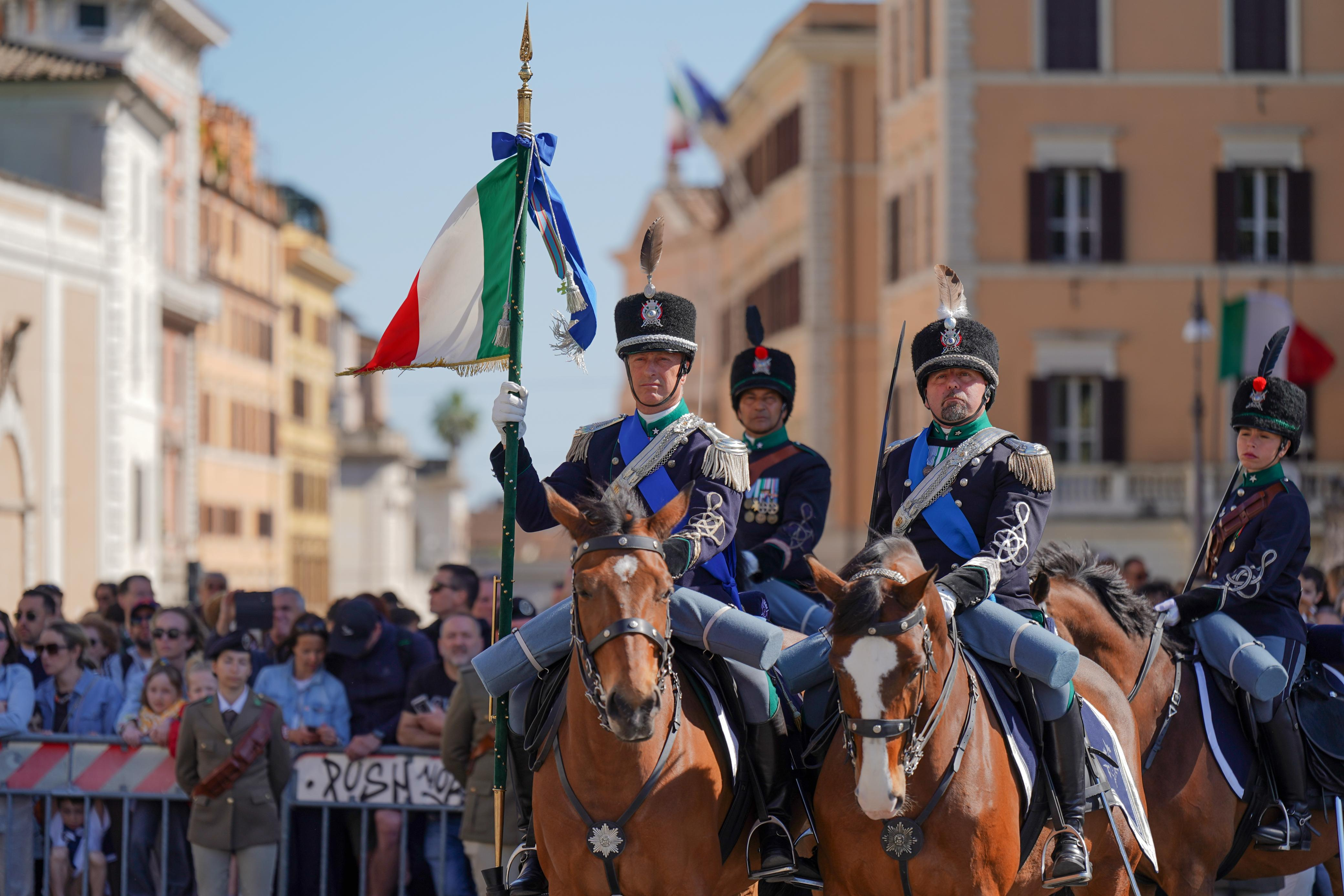
Regiment "Lancieri di Montebello" (8th) regimental standard with its colour guard during the changing of the guard at the Quirinal Palace on 2 May 2026

On 1 January 1950, the Italian Army formed the Squadrons Group "Lancieri di Montebello" in Rome. The squadron was equipped with M8 Greyhound armored cars. On 1 May 1951, the Squadrons Group "Lancieri di Montebello" was expanded to 8th Armored Cavalry Regiment "Lancieri di Montebello". The regiment consisted of a command, a command squadron, and three squadrons groups equipped with M47 Patton tanks. On 4 November 1958 the regiment was renamed Regiment "Lancieri di Montebello" (8th).

During the 1975 army reform the army disbanded the regimental level and newly independent battalions were granted for the first time their own flags, respectively in the case of cavalry units, their own standard. On 30 September 1975 the Regiment "Lancieri di Montebello" (8th) and its II and III squadrons groups were disbanded. The next day, on 1 October 1975, the regiment's I Squadrons Group was renamed 8th Armored Squadrons Group "Lancieri di Montebello". The squadrons group consisted of a command, a command and services squadron, two tank squadrons with M47 Patton tanks, and one mechanized squadron with M113 armored personnel carriers. At the time the squadrons group fielded 536 men (34 officers, 83 non-commissioned officers, and 419 soldiers).

On 12 November 1976, the President of the Italian Republic Giovanni Leone assigned with decree 846 the standard and traditions of the Regiment "Lancieri di Montebello" (8th) to the squadrons group.

On 1 July 1979, the squadrons group was reorganized as 8th Mechanized Squadrons Group "Lancieri di Montebello" and now consisted of a command, a command and services squadron, three mechanized squadrons with M113 armored personnel carriers, and a heavy mortar squadron with M106 mortar carriers with 120mm mod. 63 mortars. Afterwards the squadrons group fielded 896 men (45 officers, 100 non-commissioned officers, and 751 soldiers).

=== Recent times ===
On 22 September 1992, the 8th Mechanized Squadrons Group "Lancieri di Montebello" lost its autonomy and the next day the squadrons group entered the reformed Regiment "Lancieri di Montebello" (8th). On the same day, the standard and traditions of the Regiment "Lancieri di Montebello" (8th) were transferred from the squadrons group to the regiment. The regiment consisted of a command, a command and services squadron, and a squadrons group with three armored squadrons equipped with wheeled Centauro tank destroyers.

In 1997, the regiment was assigned to the Mechanized Brigade "Granatieri di Sardegna" as the brigade's reconnaissance unit. In March 2004, the regiment formed the Horse Squadrons Group to perform mounted public duties in Rome.

== Organization ==
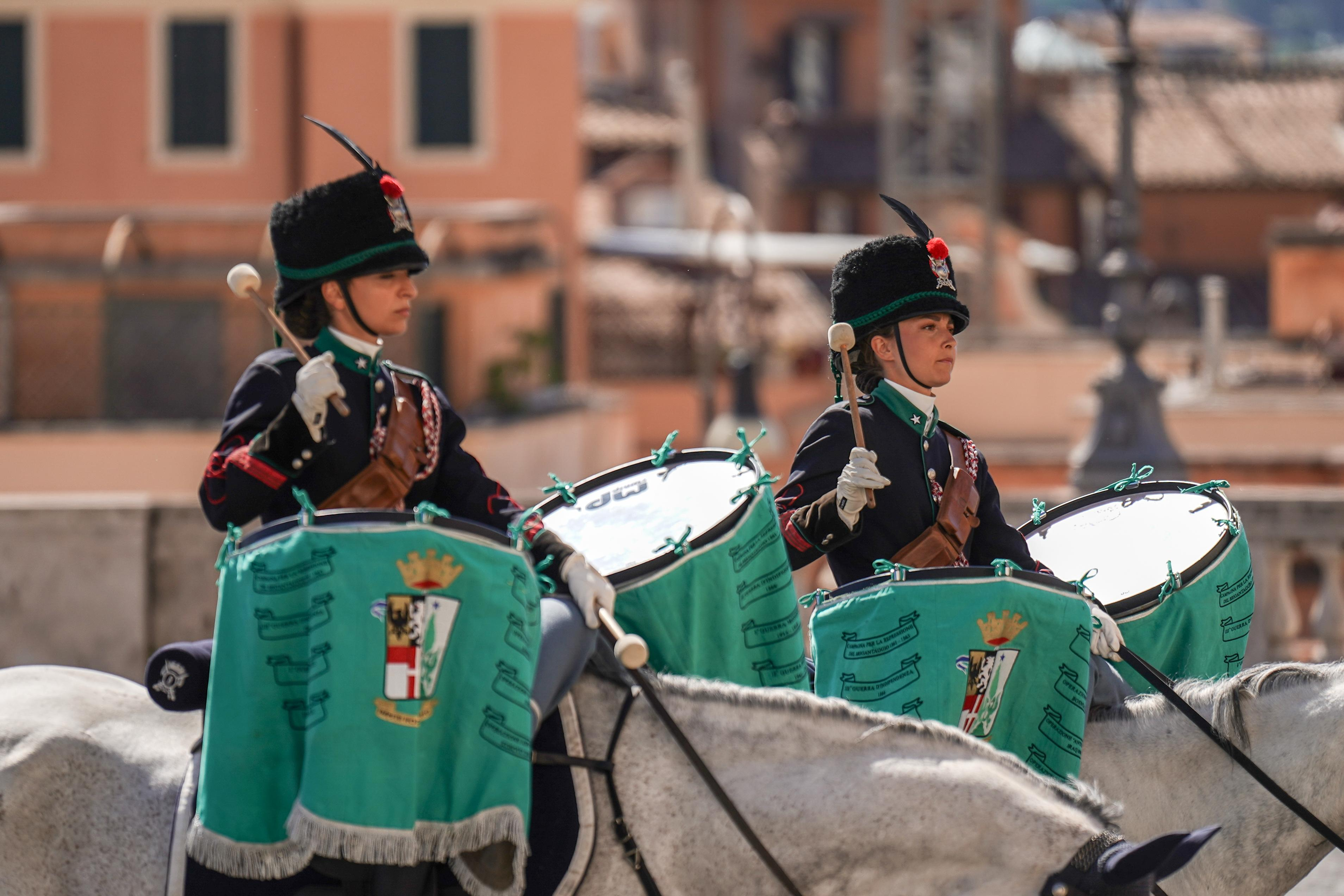
Regiment "Lancieri di Montebello" (8th) timpani drummers during the changing of the guard at the Quirinal Palace on 2 May 2026

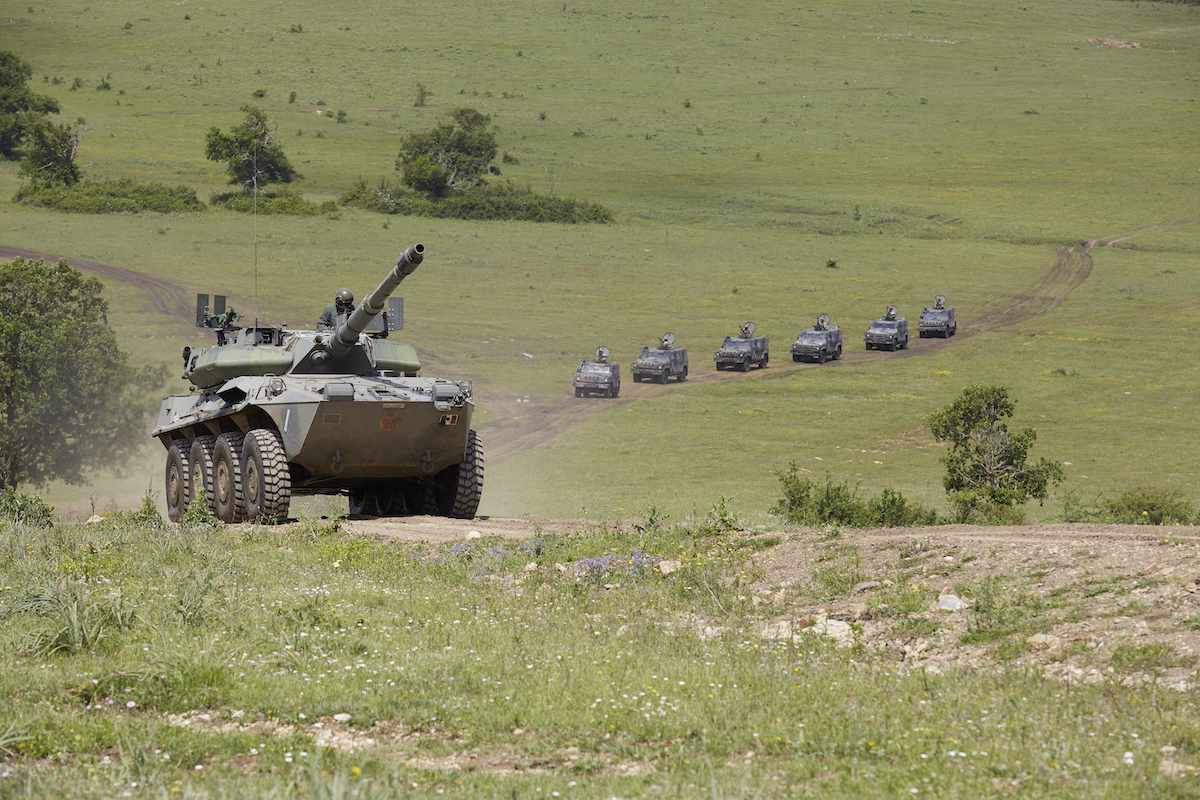
"Lancieri di Montebello" Centauro and VTLM Lince on exercise

As of 2026 the Regiment "Lancieri di Montebello" (8th) is organized as follows:

- Regiment "Lancieri di Montebello" (8th), in Rome
  - Military Equestrian Center
  - Command and Logistic Support Squadron
  - 1st Reconnaissance Squadrons Group
    - 1st Reconnaissance Squadron
    - 2nd Reconnaissance Squadron
    - 3rd Reconnaissance Squadron
    - Heavy Armored Squadron
  - Horse Squadrons Group
    - Horse Squadron
    - Honor Squadron

The three reconnaissance squadrons are equipped with Lince vehicles and Centauro tank destroyers, which are scheduled to be replaced by Lince 2 vehicles and Freccia EVO Reconnaissance vehicles. The Heavy Armored Squadron is equipped with Centauro tank destroyers, which are being replaced by Centauro 2 tank destroyers.

== See also ==
- Mechanized Brigade "Granatieri di Sardegna"
