= Regiment "Lancieri di Milano" (7th) =

Inactive Italian Army lancer unit

- Reggimento "Lancieri di Milano" (7°)
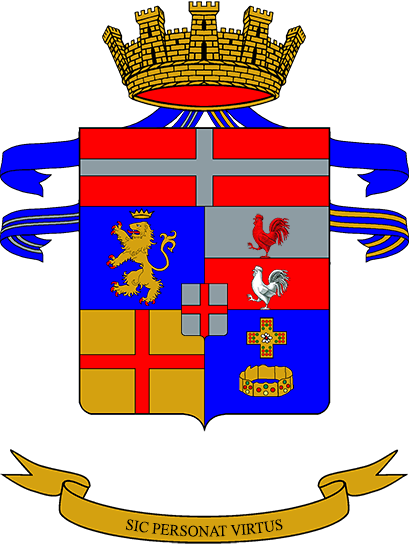
- Regimental coat of arms
- Active: 16 Sept. 1859 — 20 May 1920; 19 March 1938 — 8 Sept. 1943; 1 Aug. 1975 — 10 Dec. 1989
- Country: Italy
- Branch: Italian Army
- Part of: Armored Brigade "Pozzuolo del Friuli"
- Garrison/HQ: Remanzacco
- Motto(s): "Sic personat virtus"
- Anniversaries: 19 June 1918 - Battle of Monastier
- Decorations: 2× Bronze Medals of Military Valor; 1× War Cross of Military Valor; 1× Bronze Medal of Army Valor

Insignia
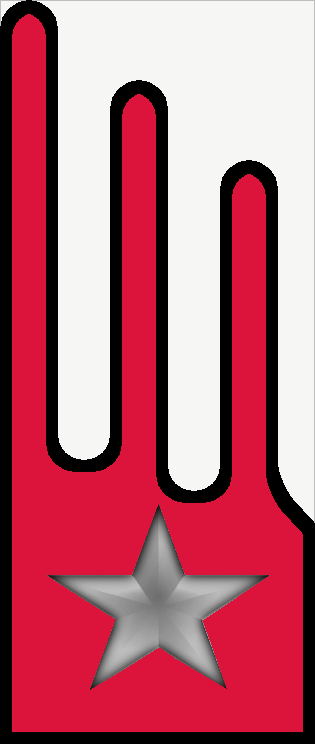
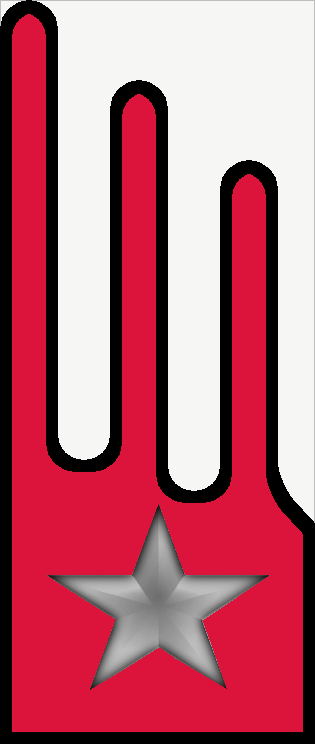
- Regimental gorget patches

The Regiment "Lancieri di Milano" (7th) (Italian: Reggimento "Lancieri di Milano" (7°) - "Lancers of Milan") is an inactive cavalry unit of the Italian Army last based in Remanzacco in Friuli-Venezia Giulia. In 1859, the Kingdom of Sardinia, after being victorious in the Second Italian War of Independence, traded the Duchy of Savoy and the County of Nice for the region of Lombardy, which the French Empire had received from the Austrian Empire after the war. In September of the same year, the Royal Sardinian Army formed the Regiment "Cavalleggeri di Milano", which was named for the Lombardy's capital Milan. In June 1860, the regiment was renamed Regiment "Lancieri di Milano". In 1866, the regiment fought in the Third Italian War of Independence and in 1870 in the Capture of Rome. In World War I the regiment's squadrons fought on the Italian front. After the war the regiment was disbanded.

In 1938, the regiment was reformed as a training unit. In 1940, the regiment lost its training role and moved to annexed Albania. In fall of the same year the regiment fought in the Greco-Italian War and in April 1941, in the invasion of Yugoslavia. In 1942-43, the regiment served on anti-partisan duty in Albania, Croatia and occupied Greece. After the announcement of the Armistice of Cassibile on 8 September 1943, the regiment's officers hid the regiment's standard and then dissolved the regiment near Larissa in Greece.

In 1964, during the Cold War, the Italian Army formed the Squadrons Group "Lancieri di Milano", which was given the name and traditions of the regiment. The squadrons group was based in Monza and assigned to the Infantry Division "Legnano" as the division's reconnaissance unit. In 1975, the squadrons group was renamed 7th Squadrons Group "Lancieri di Milano" and assigned the regiment's standard. The same year the squadrons group moved to Remanzacco and joined the Mechanized Division "Mantova" as the division's reconnaissance unit. In 1986, the Mechanized Division "Mantova" was disbanded and the squadrons group was transferred to the Armored Brigade "Pozzuolo del Friuli". In 1989, the squadrons group was disbanded and standard of the Regiment "Lancieri di Milano" (7th) was transferred to the Shrine of the Flags in the Vittoriano in Rome for safekeeping.

The regiment's anniversary falls on 19 June 1918, the fourth day of the Second Battle of the Piave River, on which the regiment defeated an Austro-Hungarian attack near Monastier di Treviso, for which the regiment was awarded a Bronze Medal of Military Valor. As the regiment is a lancer unit, its enlisted personnel is addressed as "Lancer" (Italian: Lanciere).

== History ==
=== Italian Wars of Independence ===
==== Second Italian War of Independence ====
On 21 July 1858, French Emperor Napoleon III and the Prime Minister of Sardinia Camillo Benso, Count of Cavour met in Plombières and reached a secret verbal agreement on a military alliance between the French Empire and the Kingdom of Sardinia against the Austrian Empire. On 26 January 1859, Napoleon III signed the Franco-Sardinian Treaty, followed by King Victor Emmanuel II on 29 January 1859. On 9 March 1859, Sardinia mobilized its army, followed by Austria on 9 April. On 23 April, Austria delivered an ultimatum to Sardinia demanding its demobilization. Upon Sardinia's refusal, Austria declared war on 26 April and three days later the Austrians crossed the Ticino river into Piedmont. Consequently, France honored its alliance with Sardinia and declared war on Austria on 3 May 1859, which led to the Second Italian War of Independence. On 24 June 1859, the three armies met in the Battle of Solferino. On 11 July 1859, Emperor Napoleon III and Emperor Franz Joseph I met at Villafranca and concluded the Armistice of Villafranca, which transferred Lombardy, then part of the Kingdom of Lombardy–Venetia, from Austria to France. France and Sardinian would then exchange Lombardy for the Duchy of Savoy and the County of Nice.

After the conclusion of the armistice the French and Sardinian armies occupied Lombardy. On 16 September 1859, the nine cavalry regiments of the Royal Sardinian Army ceded each one squadron to help form three new Chevau-légers regiments: Regiment "Cavalleggeri di Milano" and Regiment "Cavalleggeri di Lodi", which were named for cities in Lombardy, and the Regiment "Cavalleggeri di Montebello", which was named for the Battle of Montebello, that had been fought on 20 May of the same year. The Regiment "Cavalleggeri di Milano" was formed in the city of Vercelli and received the squadrons ceded by the Regiment "Piemonte Reale Cavalleria", Regiment "Savoia Cavalleria", and Regiment "Genova Cavalleria". Initially the regiment's troops were armed with musket, pistol, and sabre, but on 13 October 1859, the regiment's troops were equipped with lance, sabre and pistolone — a pistol with a shoulder stock. On 6 June 1860, the Sardinian War Ministry ordered that the army's cavalry regiments, which were equipped with lances — with the exception of the four line cavalry regiments — were to join the new Lancers speciality. Consequently, on the same day, the Regiment "Cavalleggeri di Milano" was renamed Regiment "Lancieri di Milano".

In 1860-61, the regiment participated in the Sardinian campaign in central Italy, during which the regiment had its baptism of fire on 12 September 1860, in a clash with Papal troops at Fano. The next day, on 13 September 1860, the regiment charged and dispersed a column of papal troops at Senigallia, for which the regiment was awarded a Bronze Medal of Military Valor, which was affixed to the regiment's standard. On 18 September 1860, the regiment fought in the Battle of Castelfidardo against papal forces. Afterwards the Sardinian forces invaded the Kingdom of the Two Sicilies, where on 26 October 1860, the regiment fought in the Battle of San Giuliano. Three days later, on 29 October 1860, the regiment fought in the decisive Battle of the Garigliano. During the following Siege of Gaeta the regiment was based in the nearby city of Fondi. On 17 March 1861, the Kingdom of the Two Sicilies was annexed by the newly proclaimed Kingdom of Italy and the Regiment "Lancieri di Milano" occupied Naples, the former capital of the Kingdom of the Two Sicilies and then moved to occupy Foggia.

In 1861-63, the regiment operated in southern Italy to suppress the anti-Sardinian revolt, which had erupted after the Kingdom of Sardinia had annexed the Kingdom of the Two Sicilies. During this time the regiment was first based in Santa Maria Capua Vetere and then in Caserta, but operated in the region of Apulia.

On 16 February 1864, the regiment ceded its 3rd Squadron to help form the Regiment "Lancieri di Foggia".

==== Third Italian War of Independence ====
On 20 June 1866, the Third Italian War of Independence between the Kingdom of Italy and the Austrian Empire began. During the war the Regiment "Lancieri di Milano" formed, together with the Regiment "Lancieri di Montebello" and Regiment "Cavalleggeri di Lodi", the I Cavalry Brigade of the IV Corps of the Army of the Po, which operated along the Po river. On 5 July 1866, the Army of the Po began the siege of the Austrian fortress at Borgoforte and during the night between 6 and 7 July the army crossed the Po river. On 11 July, the first forces of the Army of the Po entered Rovigo, which had been abandoned by the Austrians, as the Austrian forces in Italy had received the order to retreat towards the Isonzo river and the Trentino region. On 14 July, the Italian IV Corps ceded five divisions and the Italian I Corps one division to form the V Corps and VI Corps. Additionally the Italian II Corps and III Corps ceded both one division to form the VIII Corps. Afterwards the Army of the Po, which now consisted of the I, IV, V, VI, and VIII corps with a combined force of 14 divisions and six cavalry brigades, began a rapid advance through Veneto towards the Isonzo river without encountering Austrian forces.

During the advance through Veneto, two squadrons of the Regiment "Lancieri di Milano" were detached from the regiment and assigned to the 15th Division under General Giacomo Medici, which consisted of the Brigade "Pavia", Brigade "Sicilia", the 3rd Bersaglieri Regiment's XXIII and XXV Bersaglieri battalions, and three batteries of the 9th Artillery Regiment. Medici was tasked with invading Trentino from the East through the Valsugana, while Giuseppe Garibaldi's volunteers invaded Trentino from the West. On 23 July 1866, the 15th Division arrived in Borgo Valsugana and a battle ensued against Austrian forces. By nightfall the Austrian had fallen back to Levico, where they were reinforced by two battalions. At 21:30 in the evening the General Medici ordered the 28th Infantry Regiment to attack the Austrian positions and take Levico. By 23:30 in the night the Austrian commander Franz Pichler von Deeben ordered a retreat to Pergine and the two squadrons of the Regiment "Lancieri di Milano" were sent in pursuit.

In September 1870, the regiment supported the 11th and 13th divisions, which invaded the Papal States from the East and on 20 September fought in the Capture of Rome. On 10 September 1871, the regiment was renamed 7th Cavalry Regiment (Milano), and on 5 November 1876, Cavalry Regiment "Milano" (7th). In 1887, the regiment provided personnel and horses for the formation of the Mounted Hunters Squadron, which fought in the Italo-Ethiopian War of 1887–1889. In 1895-96, the regiment provided one officer and 74 enlisted for units deployed to Italian Eritrea for the First Italo-Ethiopian War. On 16 December 1897, the regiment was renamed Regiment "Lancieri di Milano" (7th).

On 1 October 1909, the regiment ceded its 3rd Squadron to help form the Regiment "Lancieri di Vercelli" (26th). In 1911–12, the regiment provided two officers and 100 enlisted to units deployed for the Italo-Turkish War.

=== World War I ===
At the outbreak of World War I the regiment consisted of a command, a depot, and two cavalry groups, with the I Group consisting of three squadrons and the II Group consisting of two squadrons and a machine gun section. Together with the Regiment "Lancieri Vittorio Emanuele II" (10th) the regiment formed the III Cavalry Brigade, which was assigned to the 2nd Cavalry Division "Veneto". On 24 May 1915, one day after Italy had declared war against the Austro-Hungarian Empire, the III Cavalry Brigade crossed the border and occupied Cervignano del Friuli and on 27 May, the city of Grado. In April 1916, the 2nd Cavalry Division was dismounted for service in the trenches of the Italian front, however once the Austro-Hungarian Army began the Asiago offensive the division was quickly mounted again and sent to guard the assembly of the Italian 5th Army around Vicenza.

In 1917, the regiment's depot in Padua formed the 854th Dismounted Machine Gunners Company as reinforcement for the regiment. On 24 October 1917, the Imperial German Army and Austro-Hungarian Army began the Battle of Caporetto and already on the first day of the battle the German 14th Army broke through the Italian lines at Kobarid. All mounted Italian cavalry regiments were sent forward to cover the retreat of the Italian 2nd Army and 3rd Army from the Isonzo front. The III Cavalry Brigade was assigned to cover the retreat of the 2nd Army and the Regiment "Lancieri di Milano" (7th) fought delaying actions at Torreano and along the Ledra-Tagliamento Canal. The regiment then fell back to the new Italian line along the Piave river.

On 15 June 1918, the Austro-Hungarian Army began the Second Battle of the Piave River, during which Austro-Hungarian forces crossed the Piave river. On 19 June, the regiment's troops stopped the enemy advance in fierce fighting at Monastier di Treviso, during which the regiment's II Group charged the Austro-Hungarian troops to the South of Monastier di Treviso. On 23 and 24 June, the regiment fought in the Italian counterattack to dislodge the Austro-Hungarian bridgehead on the Piave Vecchia river. On 24 October 1918, the Royal Italian Army began the Battle of Vittorio Veneto and on 30 October, the regiment, like all cavalry regiments, was ordered to pursue the retreating Austro-Hungarian armies. On 4 November 1918, the regiment arrived in Mortegliano, where it captured an Austro-Hungarian infantry brigade and was informed of the Armistice of Villa Giusti.

For its conduct at Monastier di Treviso and on the Piave Vecchia during the Second Battle of the Piave River and the pursuit of the fleeing enemy after Battle of Vittorio Veneto the Regiment "Lancieri di Milano" (7th) was awarded a Bronze Medal of Military Valor, which was affixed to the regiment's standard.

=== Interwar years ===
After the war the Royal Italian Army disbanded the second groups of all thirty cavalry regiments, while the first groups were reduced to two squadrons. On 21 November 1919, 14 cavalry regiments were disbanded and their groups transferred to 14 of the remaining cavalry regiments. One of the disbanded regiments was the Regiment "Cavalleggeri di Roma" (20th), whose remaining group was renamed II Squadrons Group "Cavalleggeri di Roma". Afterwards, the squadrons group, which remained based in Palmanova and retained the disbanded regiment's standard, joined the Regiment "Lancieri di Milano" (7th).

On 20 May 1920, the Royal Italian Army disbanded five additional cavalry regiments, among them the Regiment "Lancieri di Milano" (7th), and reformed the Regiment "Cavalleggeri Guide" (19th). On that day the command of the Regiment "Lancieri di Milano" (7th), the commands of the regiment's two squadrons groups, and a squadron of the regiment's I Squadrons Group were disbanded. The personnel of the regiment's disbanded command was then used to reform the command of the Regiment "Cavalleggeri Guide" (19th). On the same day, the reformed regiment took over the barracks of the Regiment "Lancieri di Milano" (7th) in Padua, while the disbanded regiment's remaining three squadrons were transferred to other cavalry regiments: the disbanded I Squadrons Group's remaining squadron was transferred to the Regiment "Genova Cavalleria" (4th) in Pordenone, while the 3rd Squadron of the II Squadrons Group "Cavalleggeri di Roma" was transferred to the Regiment "Lancieri di Novara" (5th) in Treviso, and the 4th Squadron of the II Squadrons Group "Cavalleggeri di Roma" was transferred to the Regiment "Lancieri di Aosta" (6th) in Ferrara. On 1 July 1920, the traditions and standard of the Regiment "Lancieri di Milano" (7th) were entrusted to the Regiment "Cavalleggeri Guide". On 24 May 1925, the standard of the disbanded regiment was transferred to the Shrine of the Flags, which at the time was located in Castel Sant'Angelo, for safekeeping.

On 14 March 1938, the Regiment "Lancieri di Milano" was reformed in Civitavecchia. The regiment operated as a training unit and functioned as the army's Central School of Fast Troops. At the time the regiment consisted of a command, a command squadron, one squadrons group, a machine gunners platoon, and a fast tanks platoon. Part of the regiment's personnel was drawn from the disbanded Squadron "Cavalleggeri di Sicilia".

=== World War II ===
In 1940 the regiment ended its training function and moved to annexed Albania, where the regiment received its II Squadrons Group, which consisted of Albanian personnel. The regiment then consisted of a command, a command squadron, the 5th Machine Gunners Squadron, and the I and II squadrons groups, which both consisted of two mounted squadrons. The regiment fielded 37 officers, 37 non-commissioned officers, 798 enlisted troops and 818 horses. The regiment was equipped with one car, six motorcycles, 16 trucks, 36 Breda mod. 30 light machine guns, and 12 Fiat mod. 35 heavy machine guns. In fall 1940, the regiment formed, together with the 3rd Regiment "Granatieri di Sardegna e d'Albania" and Regiment "Lancieri di Aosta", the Littoral Grouping, which, as per tradition for Italian grenadier units, was deployed on the extreme right of the Italian front for the planned Italian invasion of Greece.

On 28 October 1940, Italy invaded Greece and the Littoral Grouping quickly reached the Kalamas river in Greece. In November 1940, the Littoral Grouping fought in the Battle of Elaia–Kalamas against Greek forces. In March 1941, the Regiment "Lancieri di Milano" was reinforced with the 4th Squadron of the Regiment "Lancieri Vittorio Emanuele II" for the planned invasion of Yugoslavia. On 9-12 April 1941, the regiment distinguished itself in the Battle of Debar against Yugoslav forces. For its conduct at Debar the regiment was awarded a War Cross of Military Valor, which was affixed to the regiment's standard.

In 1942 and 1943, the regiment operated against Albanian partisans in Albania and then Yugoslav partisans in Croatia. In 1943, the regiment was transferred to occupied Greece, where it fought against Greek partisans in the area of Larissa. In the evening of 8 September 1943, the Armistice of Cassibile, which ended hostilities between the Kingdom of Italy and the Anglo-American Allies, was announced by General Dwight D. Eisenhower on Radio Algiers and by Marshal Pietro Badoglio on Italian radio. Germany reacted by invading Italy and the Regiment "Lancieri di Milano" dissolved soon thereafter in Larissa under pressure of the invading German forces.

=== Cold War ===
On 1 September 1964, the Italian Army formed the Squadrons Group "Lancieri di Milano" in Monza, which received the name and traditions of the regiment. The squadrons group was assigned to Infantry Division "Legnano" as the division's reconnaissance unit. In September 1956, the squadron was expanded to Squadrons Group "Cavalleggeri di Lodi" and moved from Verona to Novara. On 20 May 1965, the squadrons group was temporarily entrusted with the standard of the Regiment "Lancieri di Milano" (7th).

During the 1975 army reform the army disbanded the regimental level and newly independent battalions were granted for the first time their own flags, respectively in the case of cavalry units, their own standard. On 1 August 1975, the squadrons group was renamed 7th Squadrons Group "Lancieri di Milano". The squadrons group then moved from Monza to Remanzacco, where it joined the Mechanized Division "Mantova" as the division's reconnaissance unit. The squadrons group consisted of a command, a command and services squadron, and three reconnaissance squadrons equipped with Fiat Campagnola reconnaissance vehicles, M113 armored personnel carriers, and M47 Patton tanks. At the time the squadrons group fielded 667 men (36 officers, 105 non-commissioned officers, and 526 soldiers).

On 12 November 1976, the President of the Italian Republic Giovanni Leone assigned with decree 846 the standard and traditions of the Regiment "Lancieri di Milano" (7th) to the squadrons group. In 1980, the squadrons group replaced its M47 Patton tanks with Leopard 1A2 main battle tanks.

For its conduct and work after the 1976 Friuli earthquake the squadrons group was awarded a Bronze Medal of Army Valor, which was affixed to the squadrons group's standard and added to its coat of arms.

In 1986, the Italian Army abolished the divisional level and brigades, which until then had been under one of the Army's four divisions, came under direct command of the army's 3rd Army Corps or 5th Army Corps. On 30 September 1986, the Mechanized Division "Mantova" was disbanded and the next day the 7th Squadrons Group "Lancieri di Milano" was assigned to the Armored Brigade "Pozzuolo del Friuli", as one of two reconnaissance units of the 5th Army Corps.

With the Cold War nearing its end the Italian Army began to draw down its forces and the 7th Squadrons Group "Lancieri di Milano" was one of the first units to disband. On 5 December 1989, the standard of the Regiment "Lancieri di Milano" (7th) was transferred to the Shrine of the Flags in the Vittoriano in Rome for safekeeping, and five days later, on 10 December 1989, the 7th Squadrons Group "Lancieri di Milano" was disbanded.

== See also ==
- Cavalry Brigade "Pozzuolo del Friuli"
