= Monterosi =

- Comune
- Comune di Monterosi
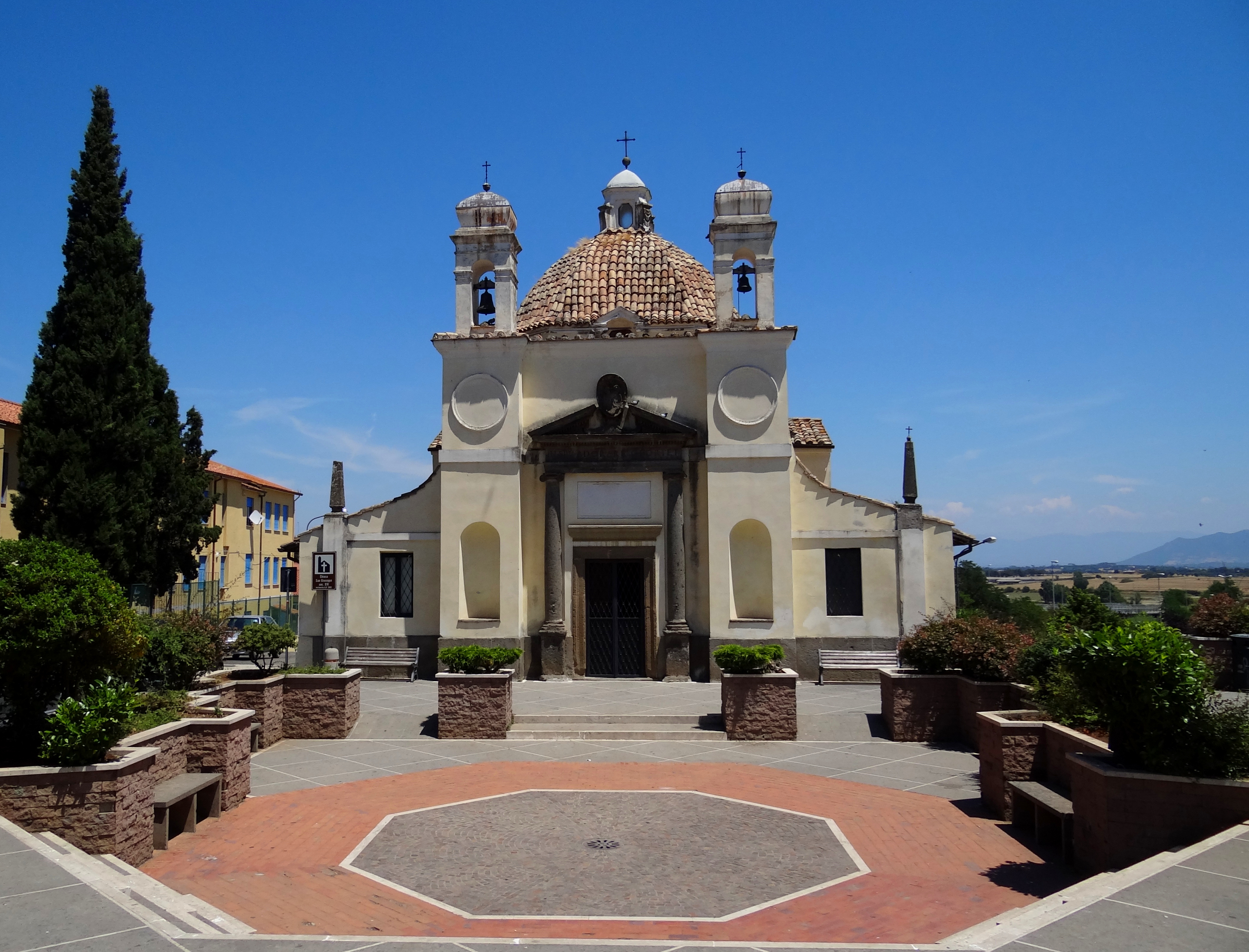

- Location within Italy Location within Lazio
- Coordinates: 42°11′N 12°18′E
- Country: Italy
- Region: Lazio
- Province: Viterbo (VT)

Government
  - Mayor: Sandro Giglietti

Area
  - Total: 10.68 km^{2} (4.12 sq mi)
- Elevation: 276 m (906 ft)

Population (2025)
  - Total: 4,761
  - Density: 445.8/km^{2} (1,155/sq mi)
- Demonym: Monterosini
- Time zone: UTC+1 (CET)
  - Summer (DST): UTC+2 (CEST)
- Postal code: 01030
- Dialing code: 0761
- Patron saint: St. Vincent and Anastasius
- Saint day: 14 September and 22 January

Monterosi is a municipality (comune) in the Province of Viterbo in the region of Lazio in Italy, located about 30 km (18,64 mi) north of the Grande Raccordo Anulare of Rome, about 40 km (24,85 mi) south of Viterbo.

== History ==
Monterosi was the location of one of the two known shrines of the Roman god Mutunus Tutunus.

== Geography ==
Monterosi's territory is located halfway through between Rome and Viterbo along the Via Cassia, on the north-Easter foot of the Sabatine Hills, not far from Lake Bracciano. Within its borders lies the small Monterosi lake, legacy of a now-extinct volcanic activity in the region.

Monterosi borders the following municipalities: Nepi, Sutri, Trevignano Romano.

== Demographics ==
Monterosi was the fastest growing municipality in Italy between 2011 and 2021.

Historical population

Year	Pop.	±%
1871	867	—
1881	684	−21.1%
1901	788	+15.2%
1911	834	+5.8%
1921	900	+7.9%
1931	876	−2.7%
1936	868	−0.9%
1951	979	+12.8%

Year	Pop.	±%
1961	986	+0.7%
1971	1,009	+2.3%
1981	1,324	+31.2%
1991	1,751	+32.3%
2001	2,381	+36.0%
2011	3,868	+62.5%
2021	4,775	+23.4%

Source: ISTAT
