= Clandestine Military Front =

Organization of the Italian resistance movement

The Clandestine Military Front (Italian: Fronte Militare Clandestino) was an organization of the Italian resistance movement that operated in German-occupied Rome between September 1943 and June 1944. It consisted of some 2,300 men, largely Royal Italian Army officers who had gone into hiding after the German capture of Rome, such as Minister of War Antonio Sorice and Generals Roberto Lordi, Mario Girotti, Dardano Fenulli and Vito Artale. Its first leader was Colonel Giuseppe Cordero Lanza di Montezemolo, who after being arrested in January 1944 was replaced by General Quirino Armellini, in turn replaced by General Roberto Bencivenga in March 1944. Thirty-four of its members, including Colonel Montezemolo and Generals Lordi, Fenulli and Artale, were among the victims of the Ardeatine massacre.
