= Giuseppe Cordero Lanza di Montezemolo =

Italian soldier and Italian Resistance member (1901–1944)

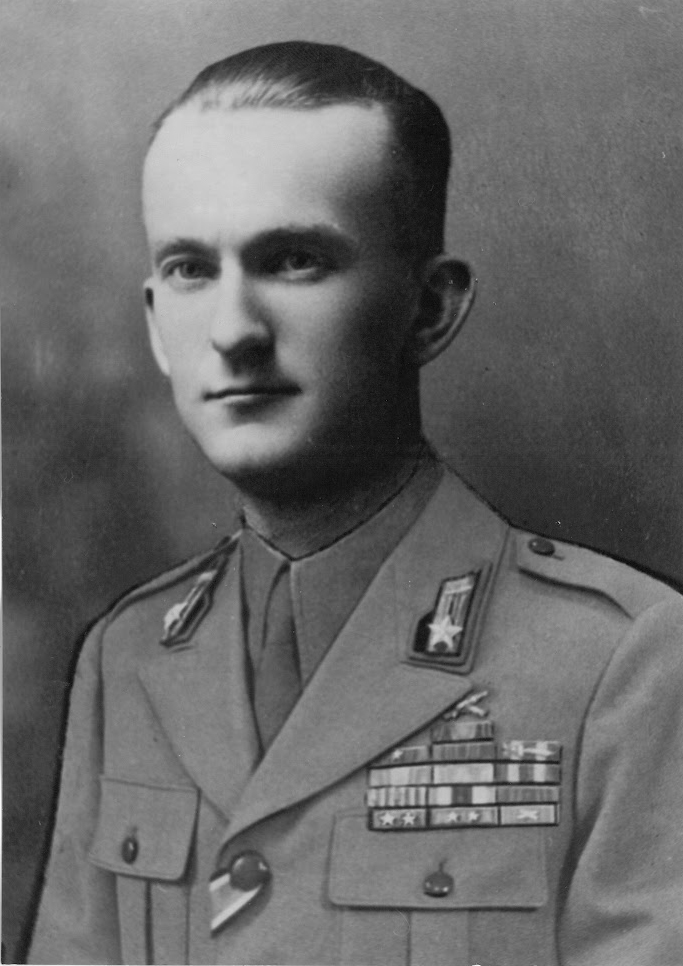
- Born: 26 May 1901; Rome, Kingdom of Italy
- Died: 24 March 1944 (aged 42); Rome, Italian Social Republic
- Military career
- Allegiance: Kingdom of Italy
- Branch: Royal Italian Army
- Service years: 1918–1944
- Rank: Colonel
- Commands: 11th Armored Engineers Group; Clandestine Military Front
- Conflicts: World War I; Spanish Civil War; World War II; Western Desert campaign; Operation Achse
- Awards: Gold Medal of Military Valor (posthumous); Silver Medal of Military Valor; Bronze Medal of Military Valor; War Cross for Military Valor; War Merit Cross (four times); Military Order of Savoy; Order of the Crown of Italy; Colonial Order of the Star of Italy; Iron Cross Second Class

Giuseppe Cordero Lanza di Montezemolo (26 May 1901 – 24 March 1944) was an Italian soldier and Italian Resistance member.

== Biography ==
He was born in Rome into a family of the old Piedmontese nobility, hailing from Mondovì, with ancient military traditions; his father Demetrio was a brigadier general, and his mother Luisa Dezza was the daughter of General and Risorgimento hero Giuseppe Dezza.

At age seventeen, he fought in the final months of the First World War as a volunteer in the 3rd Alpini Regiment, and at the end of the war he continued his career in the Engineering Corps of the Royal Italian Army; he then attended university and obtained a degree in civil engineering in 1923. In 1924 he returned to the Army, where he was promoted to captain in 1928, and was commissioned to teach at the Army Application School.

In 1935 he was assigned to the General Staff and in 1937 he volunteered for the Spanish Civil War with the Corps of Volunteer Troops, where he was initially given command of a communications battalion, and later he was appointed chief of staff of the Flechas Negras Mixed Brigade and promoted to lieutenant colonel for war merits.

In 1940 he was again called to the General Staff, and assigned to the Supreme Command of the Army (Superesercito), with responsibility for the North African theatre and later as head of the Operations Office. He was sent to North Africa and promoted to colonel in 1943. For his wartime service, he was awarded a Silver and Bronze Medal of Military Valor (the latter for action near Tobruk in April 1941), as well as the Iron Cross by the Germans.

On 19 July 1943, Montezemolo participated in the meeting between Mussolini and Hitler in Feltre, acting as an interpreter. After the fall of the Fascist regime on 25 July 1943, the new head of the government, Marshal Pietro Badoglio, entrusted Montezemolo with the direction of his secretariat; he was also appointed commander of the 11th Armored Engineers Group. Following the announcement of the Armistice of Cassibile, while the king and the government fled from Rome, Montezemolo remained in the capital; he was part of the Italian delegation that negotiated with Field Marshal Albert Kesselring the conditions of the ceasefire in the capital on 10 September 1943, after which General Giorgio Calvi di Bergolo, appointed commander of the "Open City" of Rome, made him head of the Civil Affairs Office of the Open City Command. On 23 September, following the establishment of the Italian Social Republic, German troops surrounded the Ministry of War, where the command of the open city had established its seat, and arrested Calvi di Bergolo, while Montezemolo donned civilian clothes and was able to escape through the cellars of the Ministry.

Montezemolo went into hiding under the assumed name of "engineer Giacomo Cataratto" and later of "Professor Giuseppe Martini". On 8 October he was approached by emissaries from the Royal Government, who ordered him to make direct contact with Brindisi; two days later he was able to re-establish radio contact with Brindisi, and was ordered to assume command of the Clandestine Military Front, with the task of organizing and coordinating the Roman partisan formations, although his monarchist-aligned partisans soon became rival with the Communist Gruppi di Azione Patriottica (GAP). The Allies later gave him the task of establishing connections with the newly established CLNAI in Northern Italy on behalf of the 15th Army Group.

In order to avoid Nazi reprisals on civilians, Montezemolo forbade his men from carrying out bomb attacks and assassinations against the Germans, stating that "in big cities, the severity of the consequent reprisals prevents the guerrilla from being actively conducted"; he instead oriented the activity of the Clandestine Military Front towards intelligence gathering, which was then passed on to the Allies. When the Nazi persecutions against the Jews of the capital began, Montezemolo worked to find false documents and safe conduct for the thousands of Jews who had escaped the mass round-up conducted by the SS against the Jewish community of Rome. Outside of cities, several partisan groups of Italian soldiers in uniform and former prisoners of war were organized and coordinated by Montezemolo throughout central Italy, such as the Raggruppamento Monte Amiata.

Montezemolo worked hard to coordinate with the other elements of the Roman National Liberation Committee and in particular with Communist Giorgio Amendola, with whom he planned military operations following the Anzio landing. Despite existing rivalry, the Clandestine Military Front was instrumental in providing the GAP with explosives, data and information essential for the attacks on the railway lines used by the Germans to supply their troops on the Gustav Line.

On 25 January 1944, at the end of a clandestine meeting with General Quirino Armellini, Montezemolo was arrested by the Nazis together with his friend Filippo De Grenet, also a member of the Resistance. Both were imprisoned in the SS prison in via Tasso, where Montezemolo was tortured and interrogated for 58 days, but did not reveal anything to his captors.

Armellini sent a communication to Brindisi asking that Montezemolo be exchanged with some German prisoners of equal importance, but Badoglio did not follow up on the request. On 24 March 1944, after the Via Rasella attack in which thirty-three German soldiers were killed, Montezemolo was among the 335 people chosen for execution in reprisal. He was shot on the same day in the Fosse Ardeatine massacre, along with De Grenet and several prominent members of the Clandestine Military Front. He was posthumously awarded the Gold Medal of Military Valor.
