= Regiment "Cavalleggeri di Lodi" (15th) =

Active Italian Army cavalry unit

- Reggimento "Cavalleggeri di Lodi" (15°)
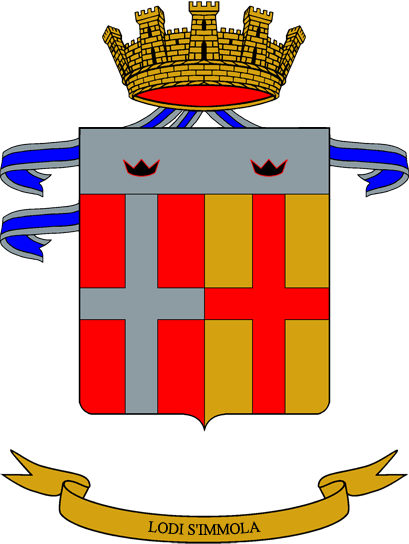
- Regimental coat of arms
- Active: 16 Sept. 1859 — 20 May 1920; 15 Feb. 1942 — 13 May 1943; 30 Oct. 1975 — 31 Oct. 1995; 10 Jan. 2020 — today
- Country: Italy
- Branch: Italian Army
- Part of: Mechanized Brigade "Pinerolo"
- Garrison/HQ: Lecce
- Motto: "Lodi s'immola"
- Anniversaries: 26 October 1911 - Battle of Bu Meliana
- Decorations: 3× Silver Medals of Military Valor; 1× Bronze Medal of Civil Merit

Insignia
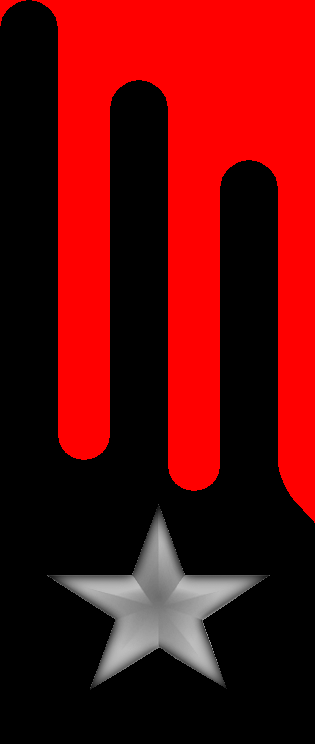
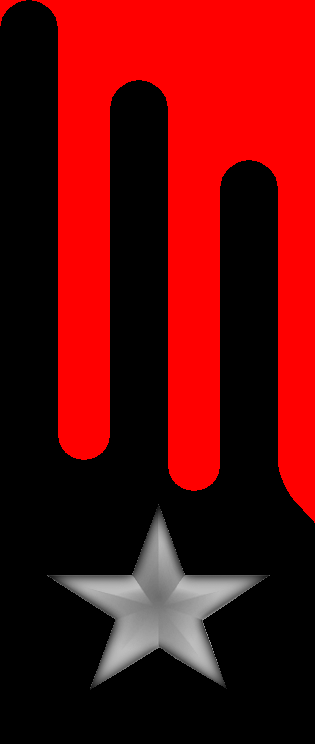
- Regimental gorget patches

The Regiment "Cavalleggeri di Lodi" (15th) (Italian: Reggimento "Cavalleggeri di Lodi" (15°) - "Chevau-légers of Lodi") is a cavalry unit of the Italian Army based in Lecce in Apulia. In 1859, the Kingdom of Sardinia, after being victorious in the Second Italian War of Independence, traded the Duchy of Savoy and the County of Nice for the region of Lombardy, which the French Empire had received from the Austrian Empire after the war. In September of the same year, the Royal Sardinian Army formed the Regiment "Cavalleggeri di Lodi", which was named for the city of Lodi in Lombardy. In 1866, the regiment fought in the Third Italian War of Independence and in 1870 in the Capture of Rome. In 1911-13, the regiment was deployed to Libya for the Italo-Turkish War. In World War I the regiment's squadrons fought on the Italian front, Albanian front, Western front, and Macedonian front. After the war the regiment was disbanded. During World War II the regiment was reformed as Armored Reconnaissance Grouping "Cavalleggeri di Lodi". The grouping fought in the Tunisian campaign, during which it was destroyed.

In 1952, during the Cold War, the Italian Army formed an armored squadron, which was given the name and traditions of the regiment. The squadron was assigned to the Armored Division "Centauro" as the division's reconnaissance unit. In 1956, the squadron was expanded to squadrons group. In 1975, the squadrons group was renamed 15th Squadrons Group "Cavalleggeri di Lodi" and assigned the regiment's standard. In 1986, the Armored Division "Centauro" was disbanded and the squadrons group reorganized as a tank formation and assigned to the Mechanized Brigade "Brescia". In 1991, the squadrons group lost its autonomy and entered the 15th Regiment "Cavalleggeri di Lodi", which one year later was renamed Regiment "Cavalleggeri di Lodi" (15th). In 1995, the regiment was disbanded and regiment's standard transferred to the Shrine of the Flags in the Vittoriano in Rome for safekeeping. In 2020, the regiment was reformed as the reconnaissance unit of the Mechanized Brigade "Pinerolo". The regiment's anniversary falls on 26 October 1911, the day the regiment's 1st and 2nd squadrons dismounted and charged Ottoman Army troops, which had broken into the Italian line at Bu Meliana to the South of Tripoli, for which the regiment was awarded a Silver Medal of Military Valor. As the regiment is a Chevau-léger unit, its enlisted personnel is addressed as "Chevau-léger" (Italian: Cavalleggero).

== History ==
=== Italian Wars of Independence ===
==== Second Italian War of Independence ====
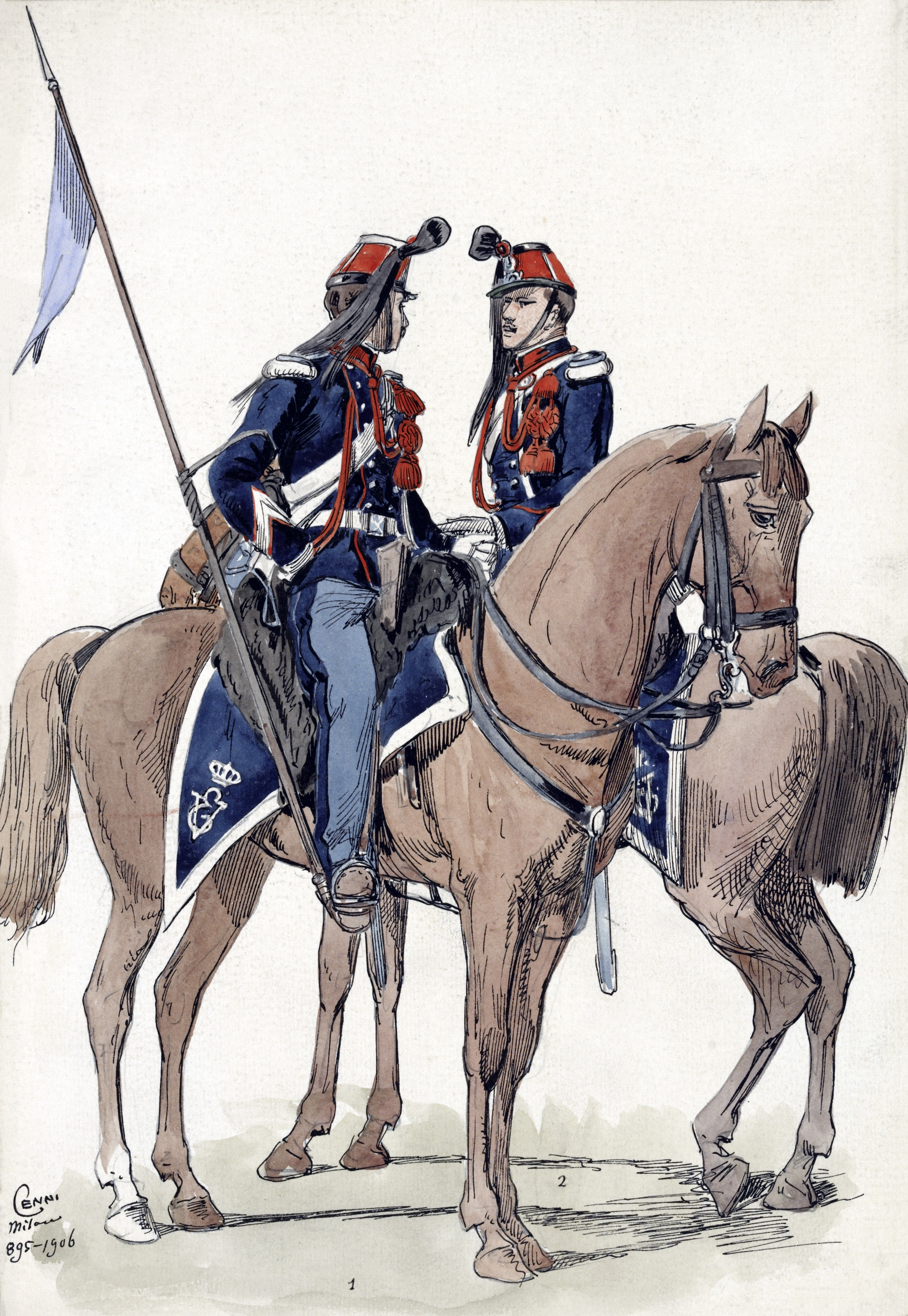
Regiment "Cavalleggeri di Lodi" non-commissioned officer and soldier in the regiment's uniform 1861 to 1870

On 21 July 1858, French Emperor Napoleon III and the Prime Minister of Sardinia Camillo Benso, Count of Cavour met in Plombières and reached a secret verbal agreement on a military alliance between the French Empire and the Kingdom of Sardinia against the Austrian Empire. On 26 January 1859, Napoleon III signed the Franco-Sardinian Treaty, followed by King Victor Emmanuel II on 29 January 1859. On 9 March 1859, Sardinia mobilized its army, followed by Austria on 9 April. On 23 April, Austria delivered an ultimatum to Sardinia demanding its demobilization. Upon Sardinia's refusal, Austria declared war on 26 April and three days later the Austrians crossed the Ticino river into Piedmont. Consequently, France honored its alliance with Sardinia and declared war on Austria on 3 May 1859, which led to the Second Italian War of Independence. On 24 June 1859, the three armies met in the Battle of Solferino. On 11 July 1859, Emperor Napoleon III and Emperor Franz Joseph I met at Villafranca and concluded the Armistice of Villafranca, which transferred Lombardy, then part of the Kingdom of Lombardy–Venetia, from Austria to France. France and Sardinian would then exchange Lombardy for the Duchy of Savoy and the County of Nice.

After the conclusion of the armistice the French and Sardinian armies occupied Lombardy. On 16 September 1859, the nine cavalry regiments of the Royal Sardinian Army ceded each one squadron to help form three new Chevau-légers regiments: Regiment "Cavalleggeri di Milano" and Regiment "Cavalleggeri di Lodi", which were named for cities in Lombardy, and the Regiment "Cavalleggeri di Montebello", which was named for the Battle of Montebello, that had been fought on 20 May of the same year. The Regiment "Cavalleggeri di Lodi" was formed in the city of Alessandria and received the squadrons ceded by the Regiment "Nizza Cavalleria", Regiment "Cavalleggeri di Saluzzo", and Regiment "Cavalleggeri di Alessandria". As one of the Royal Sardinian Army's light cavalry regiments, the regiment's troops were armed with musket, pistol, and sabre. However already on 6 June 1860, the Sardinian War Ministry ordered that the army's light cavalry regiments would be equipped henceforth only with sabre and pistol.

In 1863-64, the regiment operated in southern Italy to suppress the anti-Sardinian revolt, which had erupted after the Kingdom of Sardinia had annexed the Kingdom of the Two Sicilies. During this time the regiment was first based in Aversa in Campania and then in Lucera in Apulia. On 16 February 1864, the regiment ceded its 6th Squadron to help form the Regiment "Cavalleggeri di Caserta". Five days later, on 21 February, the regiment's 1st Squadron clashed with rebels at Torre Oppido. On 9 July of the same year, the regiment battled rebels led by Carmine Crocco near the Ofanto river.

==== Third Italian War of Independence ====
On 20 June 1866, the Third Italian War of Independence between the Kingdom of Italy and the Austrian Empire began. During the war the Regiment "Cavalleggeri di Lodi" formed, together with the Regiment "Lancieri di Milano" and Regiment "Lancieri di Montebello", the I Cavalry Brigade of the IV Corps of the Army of the Po, which operated along the Po river. On 5 July 1866, the Army of the Po began the siege of the Austrian fortress at Borgoforte and during the night between 6 and 7 July the army crossed the Po river. On 11 July, the first forces of the Army of the Po entered Rovigo, which had been abandoned by the Austrians, as the Austrian forces in Italy had received the order to retreat towards the Isonzo river and the Trentino region. On 14 July, the Italian IV Corps ceded five divisions and the Italian I Corps one division to form the V Corps and VI Corps. Additionally the Italian II Corps and III Corps ceded both one division to form the VIII Corps. Afterwards the Army of the Po, which now consisted of the I, IV, V, VI, and VIII corps with a combined force of 14 divisions and six cavalry brigades, began a rapid advance through Veneto towards the Isonzo river without encountering Austrian forces.

In September 1870, the regiment was attached to the 2nd Division, which invaded the Papal States from Orvieto and on 20 September participated in the Capture of Rome. On 10 September 1871, the regiment was renamed 15th Cavalry Regiment (Lodi). On 1 January 1872, the regiment ceded one of its squadrons to help form the 20th Cavalry Regiment (Roma). On 5 November 1876, the regiment was renamed Cavalry Regiment "Lodi" (15th). On 1 October 1883, the regiment ceded its 6th Squadron to help form the Cavalry Regiment "Catania" (22nd). In 1887, the regiment provided personnel and horses for the formation of the 1st Africa Cavalry Squadron and the Mounted Hunters Squadron, which fought in the Italo-Ethiopian War of 1887–1889. On 1 November of the same year, the regiment ceded one of its squadrons to help form the Cavalry Regiment "Vicenza" (24th). In 1895-96, the regiment provided 69 enlisted for units deployed to Italian Eritrea for the First Italo-Ethiopian War. On 16 December 1897, the regiment was renamed Regiment "Cavalleggeri di Lodi" (15th). On 1 October 1909, the regiment ceded its 3rd Squadron to help form the Regiment "Cavalleggeri di Udine" (29th).

=== Italo-Turkish War ===
On 29 September 1911, the Kingdom of Italy declared war against the Ottoman Empire, which started the Italo-Turkish War. On 5 October 1911, sailors of the Royal Italian Navy occupied Tripoli in Libya. On 11 October, the sailors were replaced by the 84th Infantry Brigade (Brigade "Venezia"), two battalions of the 40th Infantry Brigade (Brigade "Bologna"), and a battalion of the 11th Bersaglieri Regiment. The next day, on 12 October, more Italian units arrived in Tripoli, including the I Group of the Regiment "Cavalleggeri di Lodi" (15th). The I Group, which consisted of the regiment's 1st Squadron and 2nd Squadron, occupied the Ottoman Army's cavalry barracks at Bu Meliana to the South of Tripoli. Two weeks later, in the early hours of 26 October, Ottoman forces attacked the Italian line at Bu Meliana and the I Group was ordered to drive the enemy back. Due to the urgency of a counterattack, the group charged dismounted and with fixed bayonets. By 10:30 in the morning, the Ottoman forces had been driven back and three platoons of the group mounted their horses to pursue the fleeing enemy. For the valor shown on the day by the regiment's 1st Squadron and 2nd Squadron, the regiment was awarded a Silver Medal of Military Valor, which was affixed to the regiment's standard.

One year later, in October 1912, the regiment's command and II Group, which consisted of the 3rd and 4th squadrons, arrived in Tripoli. On 23 March 1913, the regiment's II Group and the 1st Savari Squadron encountered Libyan rebels near Monterus Nero. The three Italian squadrons dismounted and fired on the rebels, which soon numbered an estimated 1,000 men. The Italian squadrons then retreated on foot for three kilometers, keeping the rebels at bay through concentrated rifle fire, before mounting their horses and disengaging. After having moved out of sight of the enemy force, the three squadrons dismounted to allow the horses some rest. One hour later, the squadrons mounted their horses and charged with drawn sabers the enemy, which broke and dispersed. For the valor shown on the day by the regiment's 3rd Squadron and 4th Squadron, the regiment was awarded a Silver Medal of Military Valor, which was affixed to the regiment's standard.

=== World War I ===
At the outbreak of World War I the regiment consisted of a command, the regimental depot, and two cavalry groups, with the I Group consisting of three squadrons and the II Group consisting of two squadrons and a machine gun section. As the regiment's 1st Squadron was deployed to Libya, where the squadron remained for the duration of the war, the regiment formed the 6th Squadron as replacement. On 24 May 1915, the day Italy entered the war, the regiment was assigned to the XII Army Corps. In April 1916, the 1st Cavalry Division "Friuli" and 4th Cavalry Division "Piemonte" were dismounted for service in the trenches of the Italian front, and the remaining squadrons of the I Group of the Regiment "Cavalleggeri di Lodi" (15th) were dismounted and transferred to two of the dismounted cavalry regiments as reinforcements: the 2nd Squadron was assigned to the Regiment "Lancieri di Novara" (5th) of the 1st Cavalry Division "Friuli", while the 3rd Squadron was assigned to the Regiment "Cavalleggeri Guide" (19th) of the 4th Cavalry Division "Piemonte".

In March 1916, the regiment's command and II Group were sent to the Principality of Albania, where the Italian XVI Corps had established a front along the Vjosa river in southern Albania to protect the important port of Vlorë from the Austro-Hungarians, which had occupied the rest of Albania. In April 1916, the regiment was reinforced with dismounted troops. In June 1916, fresh troops, which had been trained by the regiment's depot in Naples, and the horses of the regiment's 2nd and 3rd squadrons arrived in Albania. With the fresh troops and horses the regiment formed the 7th Squadron and the 8th Squadron, which together formed the regiment's III Group. In October of the same year, the regiment formed, with the dismounted personnel it had received in April, the 9th Squadron and 10th Squadrons, which together formed the regiment's IV Group. In May 1917, the regiment's depot formed the dismounted 2nd Squadron bis and 3rd Squadron bis, which joined the regiment in Albania, and in July of the same year the depot formed the 732nd Dismounted Machine Gunners Company was formed, which served as reinforcement for the regiment.

In April 1918, the regiment's III Group was transferred from the Albanian front to the Western front, where the group fought in the Third Battle of the Aisne. In July 1918, the III Group fought in the Second Battle of the Marne at Reims. In southern Albania the front remained static until July 1918, when the Italian forces went on the offensive to push the Austro-Hungarian troops beyond the Seman river. On 7 July 1918, Italian forces, including the Regiment "Cavalleggeri di Lodi" (15th) with the II Group and IV Group, crossed the Vjosa river and attacked towards Mallakastër and Fier. The Austro-Hungarian troops fell back and on 9 July Italian forces reached the Seman river. After a short break the Italian units fell back to the hills South of the river, where they defeated a series of Austro-Hungarian counterattacks.

On 8 August 1918, the Allied forces began the Hundred Days Offensive on the Western front, during which the regiment's III Group fought at Chemin des Dames, in Sissonne, and on the Meuse river. On 15 September 1918, the Allied Army of the Orient began the Vardar offensive on the Macedonian front. On 29 September, Bulgaria signed the Armistice of Salonica and the next day at noon, the Bulgarian Army surrendered. With the Bulgarian surrender, the Austro-Hungarian position in Albania became untenable and consequently, in early October 1918, Italian units observed large fires along the entire Austro-Hungarian line. Italian patrols sent forward to reconnoiter, reported that the Austro-Hungarian forces had burned their supplies and fled Albania. In November 1918, the regiment's command and II Group, which consisted of the 4th, 5th, and 6th squadrons, were sent to the Bulgarian capital of Sofia, which had been occupied by allies forces.

=== Interwar years ===
After arriving in Sofia, the I Group of the Regiment "Cavalleggeri di Lucca" (16th) was attached to the regiment in December 1918. In July 1919, the command and II Group of the Regiment "Cavalleggeri di Lodi" (15th) were repatriated, while the I Group of the Regiment "Cavalleggeri di Lucca" (16th) remained in Sofia. In 1919, the Royal Italian Army disbanded the second groups of all thirty cavalry regiments, while the first groups were reduced to two squadrons. On 21 November 1919, 14 cavalry regiments were disbanded and their groups transferred to 14 of the remaining cavalry regiments. One of the disbanded regiments was the Regiment "Cavalleggeri di Udine" (29th), whose group was renamed II Squadrons Group "Cavalleggeri di Udine". Afterwards, the squadrons group, which remained based in Nola and retained the disbanded regiment's standard, joined the Regiment "Cavalleggeri di Lodi" (15th).

On 20 May 1920, the Royal Italian Army disbanded five additional cavalry regiments, among them the Regiment "Cavalleggeri di Lodi" (15th). On the same day, the regiment's I Squadrons Group was transferred to the Regiment "Lancieri di Firenze" (9th), which was renamed Regiment "Cavalleggeri di Firenze" and moved from Rome to Naples, where it took over the barracks of the disbanded regiment. Furthermore, also on the same day, the II Squadrons Group "Cavalleggeri di Udine" and that group's 4th Squadron were disbanded, while the group's 3rd Squadron was transferred to the Regiment "Cavalleggeri di Alessandria" (14th) in Florence. On 1 July 1920, the traditions and standards of the Regiment "Cavalleggeri di Lodi" (15th) and the Regiment "Cavalleggeri di Udine" (29th) were entrusted to the Regiment "Cavalleggeri di Firenze". On 24 May 1925, the standards of the two disbanded regiments were transferred to the Shrine of the Flags, which at the time was located in Castel Sant'Angelo, for safekeeping.

=== World War II ===
On 15 February 1942, the regiment was reformed in Pinerolo by the army's Cavalry School as Armored Reconnaissance Grouping "Cavalleggeri di Lodi" (Italian: Raggruppamento Esplorante Corazzato (R.E.Co) "Cavalleggeri di Lodi"). The reformed regiment consisted of the following units:

- Armored Reconnaissance Grouping "Cavalleggeri di Lodi"
  - Command Squadron
  - I Group
    - 1st Armored Car Squadron
      - Command Platoon
      - 4 × Armored car platoons, each with 7 × AB 41 armored cars
    - 2nd Tank Squadron
      - Command Platoon
      - 4 × Tank platoons, each with 4 × L6/40 tanks
    - 3rd Tank Squadron
      - Command Platoon
      - 4 × Tank platoons, each with 4 × L6/40 tanks
    - 4th Motorcyclists Squadron
      - Command Platoon
      - 3 × Motorcyclist platoons
  - II Group
    - Self-propelled Squadron
      - Command Platoon, with 1 × Semovente da 47/32 self-propelled gun
      - 2 × Self-propelled platoons, each with 5 × Semovente da 47/32 self-propelled guns
    - Anti-aircraft Squadron
      - Command Platoon
      - 4 × Cannon platoons, each with 2 × 20/65 anti-aircraft guns mounted on trucks

Initially, the grouping was intended to be sent to the Eastern front, where the Italian 8th Army was deployed along the Don river. Instead, on 21 September 1942, the grouping was ordered to deploy to North Africa to reinforce the German-Italian Panzer Army Africa. The grouping's 2nd Tank Squadron arrived complete at Benghazi in Libya and were sent to guard oases in the Libyan desert, while the Command Squadron's and Self-propelled Squadron's materiel was lost when the British submarine HMS Umbra torpedoed and sank the Italian freighter Francesco Barbaro in the Ionian Sea. The ship carrying the materiel of the grouping's remaining squadrons was damaged and had to seek shelter at Corfu to be repaired, before continuing the journey to Libya. The ship carrying the 3rd Tank Squadron's materiel was also lost and the squadron's personnel never left Pinerolo.

After the Axis defeat in the Second Battle of El Alamein and the landing of allied forces in French Morocco and French Algeria in early November 1942, the grouping was reorganized with the personnel and materiel at hand and then consisted of the following units:

- Armored Reconnaissance Grouping "Cavalleggeri di Lodi"
  - Command Squadron
  - I Group
    - 1st Armored Car Squadron
      - Command Platoon
      - 4× Armored car platoons, each with 7× AB 41 armored cars
    - 2nd Motorcyclists Squadron
      - Command Platoon
      - 3× Motorcyclist platoons
    - Anti-aircraft Squadron, with 20/65 anti-aircraft guns
      - Command Platoon
      - 4× Cannon platoons, each with 2× 20/65 anti-aircraft guns mounted on trucks

Between 20 and 25 November 1942, the grouping's personnel was flown from the Royal Italian Air Force's airfields at Castelvetrano and Sciacca in Sicily to Tripoli in Libya, with part of the personnel lost over the Mediterranean Sea to allied fighter attacks. On 24 November 1942, the grouping's first units left Tripoli and advanced to Medenine in Tunisia, which was occupied the next day. The grouping then occupied Gabès and Tataouine, followed by Kebili on 9 December and then Douz and Fatnassa on the shores of the Chott el Djerid. Patrols of the grouping also occupied Ksar Hallouf. The grouping's units were tasked with preventing the British Long Range Desert Group from interrupting the supply line running from Sfax to Gabès and from there through Mareth and Medenine to Tripoli. At the end of January 1943, after more Axis forces had arrived for the Tunisian campaign, the grouping was attached to the L Special Brigade, while half of the Armored Car Squadron and half of the Anti-aircraft Squadron were attached to the 131st Armored Division "Centauro". On 14 February 1943, the grouping's Self-propelled Squadron arrived in Tunisia. One day later, on 15 February 1943, the last Axis units arrived at the Mareth Line. In the following battles the grouping suffered heavy losses and by 20 April 1943, the grouping had lost 60% of its materiel and 50% its personnel. Consequently, on 21 April 1943, the remnants of the III Tank Group "Nizza Cavalleria" and III Armored Group "Cavalleggeri di Monferrato", were incorporated by the Armored Reconnaissance Grouping "Cavalleggeri di Lodi" to bring the grouping back up to strength. The grouping then fought at Enfidha during Operation Strike. On 13 May 1943, Axis forces in Tunisia surrendered and the Armored Reconnaissance Grouping "Cavalleggeri di Lodi" was declared lost due to wartime events.

For its conduct and sacrifice in the Tunisian campaign the Armored Reconnaissance Grouping "Cavalleggeri di Lodi" was awarded a Silver Medal of Military Valor, which was affixed to the standard of Regiment "Cavalleggeri di Lodi" (15th).

=== Cold War ===
On 1 January 1952, the Italian Army formed the Armored Cavalry Squadron "Cavalleggeri di Lodi" in Verona, which received the name and traditions of the regiment. The squadron was equipped with M8 Greyhound armored cars and assigned to Armored Division "Centauro" as the division's reconnaissance unit. In September 1956, the squadron was expanded to Squadrons Group "Cavalleggeri di Lodi" and moved from Verona to Novara. In 1964, the squadrons group moved from Novara to Lenta. On 20 May 1965, the squadrons group was temporarily entrusted with the standard of the Regiment "Cavalleggeri di Lodi" (15th). For its conduct and work after the 1968 floods in Piedmont the squadrons group was awarded a Bronze Medal of Civil Merit, which was affixed to the regiment's standard.

During the 1975 army reform the army disbanded the regimental level and newly independent battalions were granted for the first time their own flags, respectively in the case of cavalry units, their own standard. On 30 October 1975, the squadrons group was renamed 15th Squadrons Group "Cavalleggeri di Lodi". The squadrons group remained the reconnaissance unit of the Armored Division "Centauro" and consisted of a command, a command and services squadron, and three reconnaissance squadrons equipped with Fiat Campagnola reconnaissance vehicles, M113 armored personnel carriers, and M47 Patton tanks. At the time the squadrons group fielded 667 men (36 officers, 105 non-commissioned officers, and 526 soldiers).

On 12 November 1976, the President of the Italian Republic Giovanni Leone assigned with decree 846 the standard and traditions of the Regiment "Cavalleggeri di Lodi" (15th) to the squadrons group. In 1980, the squadrons group replaced its M47 Patton tanks with Leopard 1A2 main battle tanks.

In 1983, the squadrons group provided troops for the Multinational Force in Lebanon: between 17 March and 23 December over three troop rotations a total of three officers and 154 troops served in Lebanon and provided the Italian contingent there with seven CM6616 armored cars and 15 trucks.

In 1986, the Italian Army abolished the divisional level and brigades, which until then had been under one of the Army's four divisions, came under direct command of the army's 3rd Army Corps or 5th Army Corps. As the Armored Division "Centauro" was scheduled to disband on 31 October 1986, the 15th Squadrons Group "Cavalleggeri di Lodi" was reorganized as a tank unit. On 31 July 1986, the squadrons group was renamed as 15th Tank Squadrons Group "Cavalleggeri di Lodi" and assigned to the Mechanized Brigade "Brescia". The squadrons group consisted now of a command, a command and services squadron, and three tank squadrons equipped with Leopard 1A2 main battle tanks.

=== Recent times ===
After the end of the Cold War the Italian Army began to draw down its forces and the Mechanized Brigade "Brescia" was one of the first brigades to disband. On 27 July 1991, the brigade and most of its units were disbanded, while the 15th Tank Squadrons Group "Cavalleggeri di Lodi" was transferred to the 3rd Army Corps. On 5 September 1991, the 15th Tank Squadrons Group "Cavalleggeri di Lodi" lost its autonomy and the next day the squadrons group entered the 15th Regiment "Cavalleggeri di Lodi". On the same day, the standard and traditions of the Regiment "Cavalleggeri di Lodi" (15th) were transferred from the squadrons group to the 15th Regiment "Cavalleggeri di Lodi". On 10 September 1992, the regiment was renamed Regiment "Cavalleggeri di Lodi" (15th). The regiment consisted of a command, a command and services squadron, and a squadrons group with three squadrons with wheeled Centauro tank destroyers.

On 31 October 1995, the Regiment "Cavalleggeri di Lodi" (15th) was disbanded and the following 16 November the regiment's standard was transferred to the Shrine of the Flags in the Vittoriano in Rome for safekeeping.

=== Reactivation ===
In fall of 2019, the 31st Tank Regiment, which was based in Lecce and assigned to the Mechanized Brigade "Pinerolo", was reorganized as a reconnaissance unit and replaced its Ariete main battle tanks with Centauro tank destroyers. On 10 January 2020, the 31st Tank Regiment was disbanded and, on the same day, its personnel used to reform Regiment "Cavalleggeri di Lodi" (15th), which entered the Mechanized Brigade "Pinerolo" as the brigade's reconnaissance unit.

== Organization ==
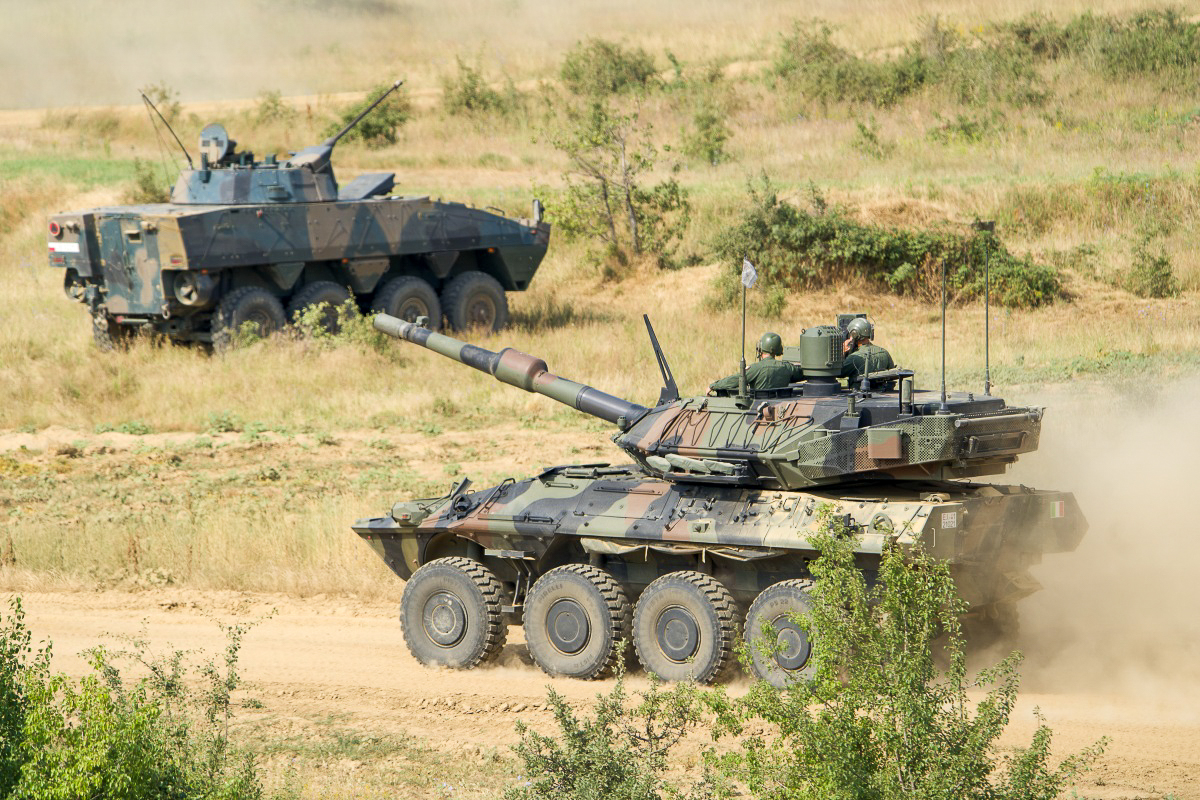
Regiment "Cavalleggeri di Lodi" (15th) Centauro 2 tank destroyer and a Romanian Army Piranha V IFV during exercise "Alliance Wall 26" in Bulgaria in July 2026

In 2024 the regiment's Heavy Armored Squadron became the army's first squadron to be equipped with Centauro 2 tank destroyers. In 2026, the Heavy Armored Squadron was merged into the 1st and 2nd reconnaissance squadrons, which in turn then became the armies first heavy reconnaissance squadrons. Thus, as of 2026, the Regiment "Cavalleggeri di Lodi" (15th) is organized as follows:

- Regiment "Cavalleggeri di Lodi" (15th), in Lecce
  - Command and Logistic Support Squadron
  - 1st Reconnaissance Squadrons Group
    - 1st Heavy Reconnaissance Squadron
    - 2nd Heavy Reconnaissance Squadron
    - Medium Reconnaissance Squadron

The two heavy reconnaissance squadrons are equipped with Lince vehicles and Centauro 2 tank destroyers. The Medium Reconnaissance Squadron is equipped with Lince vehicles, , which are scheduled to be replaced by Lince 2 vehicles and Freccia EVO Reconnaissance vehicles.

== See also ==
- Mechanized Brigade "Pinerolo"
