= Regiment "Cavalleggeri di Saluzzo" (12th) =

Inactive Italian Army cavalry unit

- Reggimento "Cavalleggeri di Saluzzo" (12°)
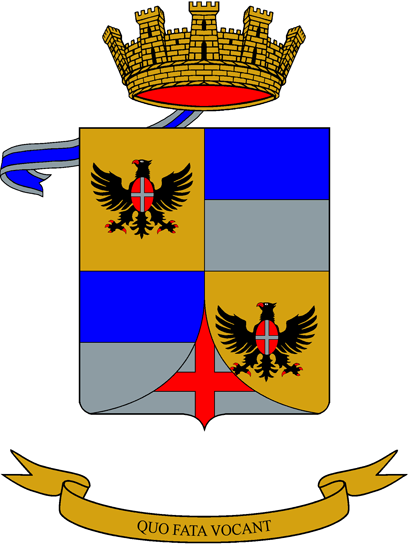
- Regimental coat of arms
- Active: 29 March 1848 — 13 Sept. 1943; 1 Jan. 1976 — 31 Jan. 1991
- Country: Italy
- Branch: Italian Army
- Part of: Mechanized Brigade "Vittorio Veneto"
- Garrison/HQ: Gorizia
- Motto(s): "Quo fata vocant"
- Anniversaries: 2 November 1918 - Battle of Istrago
- Decorations: 1× Silver Medal of Military Valor

Insignia
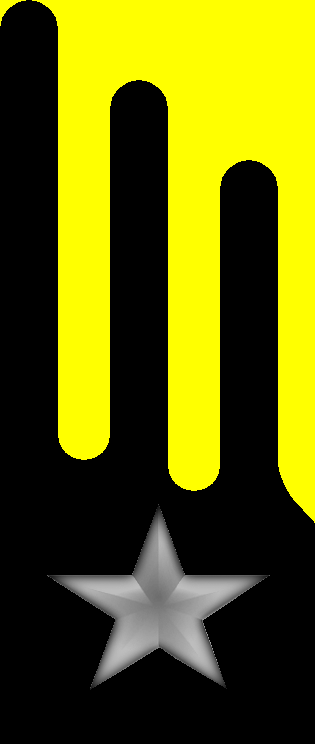
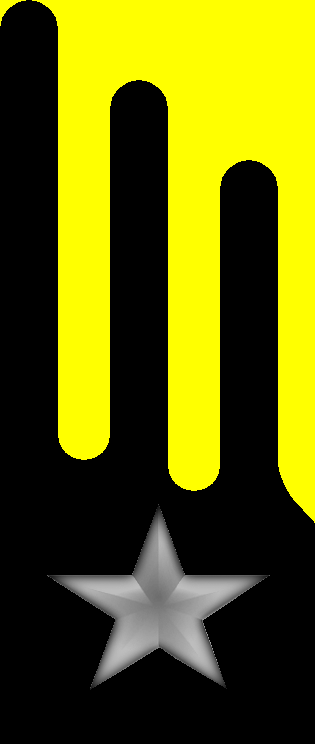
- Regimental gorget patches

The Regiment "Cavalleggeri di Saluzzo" (12th) (Italian: Reggimento "Cavalleggeri di Saluzzo" (12°) - "Chevau-légers of Saluzzo") is an inactive cavalry unit of the Italian Army named for the Marquisate of Saluzzo. In 1848, Provisional Government of Milan formed two cavalry regiments for the First Italian War of Independence. In September of the same year, the two regiments joined the Royal Sardinian Army. In May 1849, the two regiments merged to form the 7th Regiment of Cavalry, which in January 1850 was renamed Regiment "Cavalleggeri di Saluzzo". The regiment fought in the Crimean War, Second Italian War of Independence, and Third Italian War of Independence. In World War I the regiment fought on the Italian Front. During World War II the regiment was assigned to the 1st Cavalry Division "Eugenio di Savoia", which was deployed to occupied Yugoslavia on anti-partisan duty. The division and its units were disbanded after the announcement of the Armistice of Cassibile by invading German forces.

In 1964, the Italian Army formed a squadrons group, which received the name and traditions of the regiment. In 1965, the Squadrons Group "Cavalleggeri di Saluzzo" joined the Infantry Division "Folgore" as the division's reconnaissance unit. In 1976, the squadrons group was renamed 12th Squadrons Group "Cavalleggeri di Saluzzo" and assigned the regiment's standard. In 1986, the Mechanized Division "Folgore" was disbanded and the squadrons group reorganized as a mechanized formation and assigned to the Mechanized Brigade "Vittorio Veneto". In 1991, after the end of the Cold War the squadrons group was disbanded. The regiment's anniversary falls on 2 November 1918, the day the regiment charged an Austro-Hungarian Army rearguard at Istrago, for which the regiment was awarded a Silver Medal of Military Valor. As the regiment is a Chevau-léger unit, its enlisted personnel is addressed as "Chevau-léger" (Italian: Cavalleggero).

== History ==
=== Italian Wars of Independence ===
==== First Italian War of Independence ====
On 29 March 1848, one week after the people of Milan had driven the Imperial Austrian Army out of the city during the Five Days of Milan, the Provisional Government of Milan ordered to form two cavalry depots in Milan: one for a Dragoons regiment and the other for a Chevau-légers regiment. Once the 1st Dragoons Squadron and the 1st Chevau-légers Squadron had been formed, they were sent to join the Lombard Division for the ongoing first campaign of the First Italian War of Independence. Afterwards the two depots continued to form the remainder of the two regiments, which were named Lombard Dragoons Regiment (Italian: Reggimento Dragoni Lombardi) respectively Lombard Chevau-légers Regiment (Italian: Reggimento Cavalleggeri Lombardi). The two regiments assembled at Vigevano in Lombardy. However, on 22-27 July 1848, the Royal Sardinian Army lost the Battle of Custoza and the Battle of Volta Mantovana. On the evening of 27 July, King Charles Albert ordered a retreat towards Milan. In the morning of 4 August 1848, the Sardinian forces, which included the 1st Dragoons Squadron and the 1st Chevau-légers Squadron, clashed with the Austrian vanguards outside of Milan. By 19h in the evening of 4 August, the Sardinian troops retreated within the walls of Milan, where one hour later King Charles Albert held a war council, which decided to abandon the city due to a lack of munitions and food. The next morning the Sardinians were informed that the Austrian commander Field Marshal Joseph Radetzky von Radetz had agreed to allow the Sardinians to retreat and by 6 August the Sardinians had left Milan and retreated over the Ticino river into Piedmont. With the Sardinian troops also thousands of Milanese civilians and the military units of the Provisional Government of Milan, crossed the Ticino. Three days later, on 9 August, the Austrian General Heinrich von Heß and the Sardinian General Carlo Canera di Salasco signed the Armistice of Salasco, which stated that Charles Albert's troops would withdraw from the whole of the Kingdom of Lombardy–Venetia, and the Duchy of Parma and Piacenza and Duchy of Modena and Reggio. Thus ended the First Campaign of the war.

The armistice forced the Lombard Dragoons Regiment and Lombard Chevau-légers Regiment to move to Venaria Reale near Turin, where both regiments were formally incorporated into the Royal Sardinian Army on 5 September 1848. On 1 March 1849, the Sardinian Chamber of Deputies voted for the resumption of the war, with 94 votes in favour and 24 against. King Charles Albert decided that hostilities would resume on 20 March and, as stipulated in the 1848 armistice, the Austrians were informed about the continuation of the war eight days before the hostilities resumed. Charles Albert massed his army near Novara, while the Lombard Division under General Girolamo Ramorino and the Lombard Chevau-légers Regiment were sent to guard the Ticino river crossings at Pavia. On 20 March, the Lombard division was at La Cava, from where it was possible to observe the Ticino river from Pavia to its confluence with the Po river. In the event the Lombard Division was attacked it was to retreat North through Sannazzaro towards Mortara. However, early on 20 March General Ramorino abandoned La Cava and moved his forces South across the Po river, leaving only the 21st Infantry Regiment at La Cava with orders to retreat across the Po river if the regiment was attacked. At noon on the same day the whole Austrian Army crossed the Ticino river at Pavia and, even though the 21st Infantry Regiment led Major Luciano Manara resisted for six hours, the Austrians fixed the 21st Infantry Regiment in place with a screening forces, while the main body of the army marched North towards Mortara and Vigevano.

Ultimately the 21st Infantry Regiment was forced to retreat across the Po river, where it joined with the rest of the Lombard units, which played no role in the remaining events of the war. On 22-23 March 1849, Field Marshal Radetzky decisively defeated the Sardinians in the Battle of Novara, in which two squadrons of the Lombard Dragoons Regiment fought. In the evening of 23 March, King Charles Albert abdicated in favour of his son Victor Emmanuel. On 24 March, the new king met with Radetzky at Vignale and agreed to an armistice, which ended the short Second Campaign of the First Italian War of Independence. As a consequence of the Sardinian defeat the Lombard Division and its four regiments were disbanded in May 1849, while the two Lombard cavalry regiments were merged on 15 May 1849 as 7th Regiment of Cavalry. On 3 January 1850, the regiment was renamed Regiment "Cavalleggeri di Saluzzo" and ceded some of its horses to help form the 4th Squadron of the newly formed Regiment "Cavalleggeri di Monferrato". As one of the Royal Sardinian Army's light cavalry regiments, the regiment's troops wore a yellow kepi and were armed with musket, pistol, and sabre.

On 31 March 1855, the regiment's 1st Squadron was assigned to the Provisional Cavalry Regiment for the Sardinian expeditionary corps, which deployed to Crimea for the Crimean War. On 16 August 1855, the Provisional Cavalry Regiment fought in the Battle of the Chernaya. After the Crimean War the regiment was repatriated and, on 18 June 1856, disbanded and its squadrons returned to their original regiments.

==== Second Italian War of Independence ====
On 26 April 1859, the Second Italian War of Independence began and three days later, on 29 April, a platoon of the Regiment "Cavalleggeri di Saluzzo" drew first blood in a clash with the Austrian 12th Hussars Regiment "Graf Haller" at Zinasco. On 1 May, the Regiment "Cavalleggeri di Saluzzo" clashed with Austrian vanguards at Torre Beretti. On 29 and 30 May, the bulk of the Piedmontese forces, which included the Regiment "Cavalleggeri di Saluzzo", crossed the Sesia river at Vercelli to cover the French Army's right flank, while the French crossed the Sesia further North. On 30 May, the Piedmontese 2nd Division advanced from Borgo Vercelli to Casalino, where the division was divided into two columns: one headed to Vinzaglio, while the other marched to Confienza. By nightfall of the 30 May, Confienza was in Italian hands and the next morning the 4th Squadron of Regiment "Cavalleggeri di Saluzzo" and a company of Bersaglieri attacked Austrian forces assembling to the South at Robbio to allow the Piedmontese Brigade "Piemonte" and Brigade "Aosta" at Confienza to prepare for upcoming Battle of Confienza.

On 24 June 1859, the Regiment "Cavalleggeri di Saluzzo" fought in the Battle of San Martino, during which the regiment's 1st Squadron dispersed an Austrian Jäger Battalion near San Martino. Afterwards the regiment participated in the Siege of Peschiera. On 16 September 1859, the Royal Sardinian Army's nine cavalry regiments ceded one squadron each to help form three new Chevau-légers regiments and the three squadrons ceded by the cavalry regiments "Nizza Cavalleria", "Cavalleggeri di Saluzzo", and "Cavalleggeri di Alessandria" were used to form the Regiment "Cavalleggeri di Lodi". On 6 June 1860, the Sardinian War Ministry ordered that the army's light cavalry regiments would be equipped henceforth with sabre and pistol.

In 1862 and 1863, the regiment operated in southern Italy to suppress the anti-Sardinian revolt, which had erupted after the Kingdom of Sardinia had annexed the Kingdom of the Two Sicilies. During this time the regiment was based in Campania and clashed with rebels at Rapolla and Venosa in the Vulture region, and then at Gioia del Colle at the southern end of the Murge plateau. During these operations against the rebels the regiment lost 43 troops. On 16 February 1864, the regiment ceded its 5th Squadron to help form the Regiment "Cavalleggeri di Caserta".

==== Third Italian War of Independence ====
On 20 June 1866, the Third Italian War of Independence between the Kingdom of Italy and the Austrian Empire began. During the war the Regiment "Cavalleggeri di Saluzzo" formed, together with the Regiment "Cavalleggeri di Alessandria" and Regiment "Lancieri di Foggia", the Cavalry Brigade of the III Corps of the Army of the Mincio, which operated along the Mincio river. On 24 June, the Army of the Mincio clashed with the Austrian South Army in the Battle of Custoza.

On 10 September 1871, the regiment was renamed 12th Cavalry Regiment (Saluzzo). On 1 January 1872, the regiment ceded one of its squadrons to help form the 20th Cavalry Regiment (Roma). On 5 November 1876, the regiment was renamed Cavalry Regiment "Saluzzo" (12th). On 1 October 1883, the regiment ceded its 6th Squadron to help form the Cavalry Regiment "Catania" (22nd). In 1887, the regiment provided personnel and horses for the formation of the Mounted Hunters Squadron, which fought in the Italo-Ethiopian War of 1887–1889. On 1 November of the same year, the regiment ceded one of its squadrons to help form the Cavalry Regiment "Umberto I" (23rd). In 1895-96, the regiment provided 67 enlisted for units deployed to Italian Eritrea for the First Italo-Ethiopian War. On 16 December 1897, the regiment was renamed Regiment "Cavalleggeri di Saluzzo" (12th). On 1 October 1909, the regiment ceded its 3rd Squadron to help form the Regiment "Cavalleggeri di Treviso" (28th). In 1911–12, the regiment provided five officer and 81 enlisted to units deployed for the Italo-Turkish War.

=== World War I ===
At the outbreak of World War I the regiment consisted of a command, a depot, and two cavalry groups, with the I Group consisting of three squadrons and the II Group consisting of two squadrons and a machine gun section. Together with the Regiment "Cavalleggeri di Vicenza" (24th) the regiment formed the V Cavalry Brigade, which was assigned to the 3rd Cavalry Division "Lombardia". In April 1916, the 3rd Cavalry Division was dismounted for service in the trenches of the Italian front, however once the Austro-Hungarian Army began the Asiago offensive the division was quickly mounted again and sent to guard the assembly of the Italian 5th Army around Vicenza. Between 11 and 16 August 1916, the regiment fought in the Sixth Battle of the Isonzo. In 1917, the regiment's depot in Milan formed the 852nd Dismounted Machine Gunners Company as reinforcement for the regiment. On 19 August 1917, the regiment moved crossed the Isonzo river at Plave and moved to the Banjšice plateau for the upcoming Eleventh Battle of the Isonzo. During the battle the regiment distinguished itself between 24 and 30 August at Grgar.

On 24 October 1917, the Imperial German Army and Austro-Hungarian Army began the Battle of Caporetto and already on the first day of the battle the German 14th Army broke through the Italian lines at Kobarid. All mounted Italian cavalry regiments were sent forward to cover the retreat of the Italian 2nd Army and 3rd Army from the Isonzo front. On 26 October, the regiment was reinforced by a group of the Regiment "Cavalleggeri Umberto I" (23rd). On 27 October, the regiment took up positions in the village of Salt to protect the bride over the Torre river. However the Austro-Hungarian Army forded the Torre further South at Beivars. The regiment then crossed the Torre and its squadrons charged enemy patrols, which enabled the Italian rearguards to disengage and retreat. On 29 October, the regiment retreated with other units to Feletto and then Moruzzo. Just after midnight during the night of 29 to 30 October, the regiment was ordered to retreat to Fagagna, where the regiment formed the left flank of the 2nd Cavalry Division "Veneto", which screened the Italian retreat over the Tagliamento river. On 3 November 1917, the regiment was ordered to Travesio, where the regiment was reinforced by the seven Bersaglieri cyclist battalions, five armored car squads with 1ZM armored cars, and a horse artillery Group. The formation was tasked with covering the Italian reatrat. On 5 November 1917, the regiment screened the Italian retreat over the Meduna river. The next day, the regiment covered the Italian retreat over the bridges over the Livenza river at Sacile. On 9 November, the regiment arrived in Ponte della Priula, where it crossed the Piave river, along which the Royal Italian Army established the new frontline.

On 24 October 1918, the Royal Italian Army began the Battle of Vittorio Veneto and on 30 October, the regiment crossed the Piave river at Ponte della Priula to pursue the retreating Austro-Hungarian armies. On 1 November, the regiment arrived in Roveredo and the next day the regiment forded the Cellina river at San Foca. At noon of the same day, the regiment reached Tauriano, from where the regiment planned to advance through Istrago, Vacile, and Lestans to Pinzano, where the regiment planned to cross the Tagliamento river. However already at Istrago the regiment encountered an Austro-Hungarian rearguard of two infantry companies with six machine guns and two cannons. The Regiment "Cavalleggeri di Saluzzo" (12th) brought its own machine guns up to lay suppressive fire, while the regiment's squadrons charged the enemy position and dispersed the Austro-Hungarian troops. By nightfall, the regiment arrived in Lestans. The next day the regiment discovered that the bridge at Pinzano had been destroyed and consequently, the regiment turned South to cross the river at Bonzicco and the next day, on 4 November, the regiment crossed the river. The regiment then moved to Basiliano and by noon entered Udine, from where the regiment advanced to Cividale del Friuli and then San Pietro al Natisone, where the regiment stopped its advance at 15:00 as the Armistice of Villa Giusti came into force.

For its conduct during the Sixth Battle of the Isonzo, Eleventh Battle of the Isonzo, the retreat to Piave river after the Battle of Caporetto, and the pursuit of the Austro-Hungarian Army after the Battle of Vittorio Veneto, the Regiment "Cavalleggeri di Saluzzo" (12th) was awarded a Silver Medal of Military Valor, which was affixed to the regiment's standard.

=== Interwar years ===
After the war the Royal Italian Army disbanded the second groups of all thirty cavalry regiments, while the first groups were reduced to two squadrons. On 21 November 1919, 14 cavalry regiments were disbanded and their groups transferred to 14 of the remaining cavalry regiments. One of the disbanded regiments was the Regiment "Cavalleggeri di Vicenza" (24th), whose group was renamed II Squadrons Group "Cavalleggeri di Vicenza". Afterwards, the squadrons group, which remained based in Lodi and retained the disbanded regiment's standard, was assigned to the Regiment "Cavalleggeri di Saluzzo" (12th).

On 20 May 1920, the Royal Italian Army disbanded five additional cavalry regiments, among them the Regiment "Cavalleggeri di Foggia" (11th). On 1 July 1920, the II Squadrons Group "Lancieri di Mantova" of the Regiment "Genova Cavalleria" (4th) in Bologna was disbanded and the Regiment "Cavalleggeri di Saluzzo" (12th) moved from Milan to Bologna, where it took over the barracks of the disbanded Squadrons Group. On the same day, 1 July 1920, the traditions and standard of the Regiment "Cavalleggeri di Foggia" (11th) were entrusted to the Regiment "Cavalleggeri di Saluzzo" (12th), which was renamed Regiment "Cavalleggeri di Saluzzo". On 24 May 1925, the standard of the Regiment "Cavalleggeri di Foggia" (11th) was transferred to the Shrine of the Flags, which at the time was located in Castel Sant'Angelo, for safekeeping.

On 1 January 1927, the regiment moved from Bologna to Pordenone. On 15 June 1930, the regiment was assigned, together with the Regiment "Cavalleggeri di Monferrato" (13th) and Regiment "Cavalleggeri di Alessandria" (14th), to the 1st Cavalry Division. In 1935-36, the regiment provided seven officers and 450 enlisted for units deployed to East Africa for the Second Italo-Ethiopian War.

=== World War II ===
At the outbreak of World War II the regiment was assigned to the 1st Cavalry Division "Eugenio di Savoia" and consisted of a command, a command squadron, the 5th Machine Gunners Squadron, and the I and II squadrons groups, which both consisted of two mounted squadrons. The regiment fielded 37 officers, 37 non-commissioned officers, 798 enlisted troops and 818 horses. The regiment was equipped with one car, six motorcycles, 16 trucks, 36 Breda mod. 30 light machine guns, and 12 Fiat mod. 35 heavy machine guns. Between 6 and 18 April 1941, the division fought in the invasion of Yugoslavia. Afterwards, the division remained in occupied Yugoslavia on anti-partisan duty. During the regiment's presence in Yugoslavia, the regiment's depot in Pordenone formed the XVII Dismounted Group "Cavalleggeri di Saluzzo" and the LVIII Dismounted Group "Cavalleggeri di Saluzzo". In 1942, the Regiment "Cavalleggeri di Saluzzo" clashed with partisan forces in the Žumberak mountains and the Petrova Gora mountain ridge. In December 1942, the regiment was sent to Šibenik and tasked with dispersing partisan formations operating in the area from Trogir to Konjevrate, where the regiment defeated a partisan detachment on 3 January 1943. On 1 June 1943, the regiment moved to Kraljevica, with one of its squadron groups detached to Krasica.

In the evening of 8 September 1943, the Armistice of Cassibile, which ended hostilities between the Kingdom of Italy and the Anglo-American Allies, was announced by General Dwight D. Eisenhower on Radio Algiers and by Marshal Pietro Badoglio on Italian radio. Germany reacted by invading Italy. The announcement of the armistice reached the Regiment "Cavalleggeri di Saluzzo" in Novi Vinodolski. On 11 September, the regiment moved to Rijeka, which it found deserted by Italian higher commands. On 13 September, German forces entered Rijeka and the regiment's Commander Colonel Giuseppe Curreno di Santa Maddalena decided to dissolve the regiment. The regiment's standard was hidden and afterwards the regiment's troops dispersed, with most joining the nascent Italian resistance movement.

=== Cold War ===
On 15 September 1964, the Italian Army disbanded the Regiment "Lancieri di Aosta" (6th) in Reggio Emilia and the next day the regiment's II Squadrons Group was renamed Squadrons Group "Cavalleggeri di Saluzzo". In 1965, the squadrons group moved from Reggio Emilia to Gradisca d'Isonzo in Friuli-Venezia Giulia, where it joined the Infantry Division "Folgore" as the division's reconnaissance unit. On 20 May 1965, the squadrons group was temporarily entrusted with the standard of the Regiment "Cavalleggeri di Saluzzo" (12th).

During the 1975 army reform the army disbanded the regimental level and newly independent battalions were granted for the first time their own flags, respectively in the case of cavalry units, their own standard. As part of the reform the squadrons group moved from Gradisca d'Isonzo to Gorizia. On 1 January 1976, the squadrons group was renamed 12th Squadrons Group "Cavalleggeri di Saluzzo". The squadrons group remained the reconnaissance unit of the Mechanized Division "Folgore" and consisted of a command, a command and services squadron, and three reconnaissance squadrons equipped with Fiat Campagnola reconnaissance vehicles, M113 armored personnel carriers, and M47 Patton tanks. At the time the squadrons group fielded 667 men (36 officers, 105 non-commissioned officers, and 526 soldiers).

On 12 November 1976, the President of the Italian Republic Giovanni Leone assigned with decree 846 the standard and traditions of the Regiment "Cavalleggeri di Saluzzo" (12th) to the squadrons group. In 1980, the squadrons group replaced its M47 Patton tanks with Leopard 1A2 main battle tanks.

In 1986, the Italian Army abolished the divisional level and brigades, which until then had been under one of the Army's four divisions, came under direct command of the army's 3rd Army Corps or 5th Army Corps. As the Mechanized Division "Folgore" was scheduled to disband on 31 October 1986, the 12th Squadrons Group "Cavalleggeri di Saluzzo" was reorganized as a mechanized unit. On 31 July 1986, the squadrons group was renamed as 12th Mechanized Squadrons Group "Cavalleggeri di Saluzzo" and assigned to the Armored Brigade "Vittorio Veneto", which on 30 October of the same year was renamed Mechanized Brigade "Vittorio Veneto". The squadrons group consisted now of a command, a command and services squadron, three mechanized squadrons with M113 armored personnel carriers, and a heavy mortar squadron with M106 mortar carriers with 120mm mod. 63 mortars.

=== Recent times ===
After the end of the Cold War the Italian Army began to draw down its forces and the Mechanized Brigade "Vittorio Veneto" was one of the first brigades earmarked to be disband. On 31 January 1991, the 12th Mechanized Squadrons Group "Cavalleggeri di Saluzzo" was disbanded and the standard of the Regiment "Cavalleggeri di Saluzzo" (12th) was transferred the following 20 February to the Shrine of the Flags in the Vittoriano in Rome for safekeeping.

== See also ==
- Mechanized Brigade "Vittorio Veneto"
