= Regiment "Cavalleggeri di Alessandria" (14th) =

Inactive Italian Army cavalry unit

- Reggimento "Cavalleggeri di Alessandria" (14°)
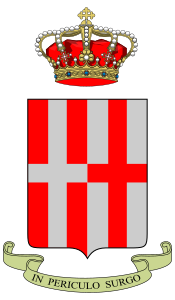
- Regimental coat of arms
- Active: 3 Jan. 1850 — 14 Sept. 1943
- Country: Italy
- Branch: Italian Army
- Part of: Infantry Division "Granatieri di Sardegna"
- Garrison/HQ: Persano
- Motto: "In pericolo surgo"
- Anniversaries: 24 June 1866 - Battle of Custoza
- Decorations: 1× Silver Medal of Military Valor; 1× Bronze Medal of Military Valor

Insignia
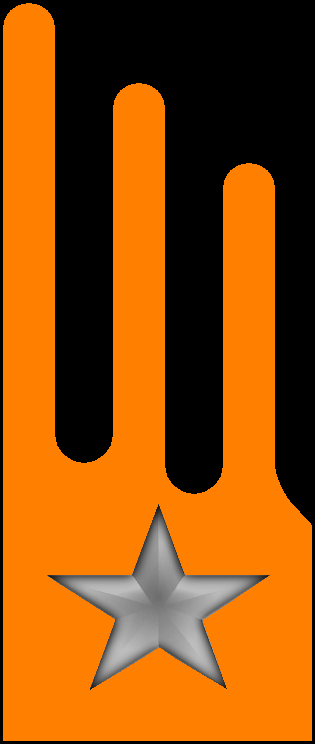
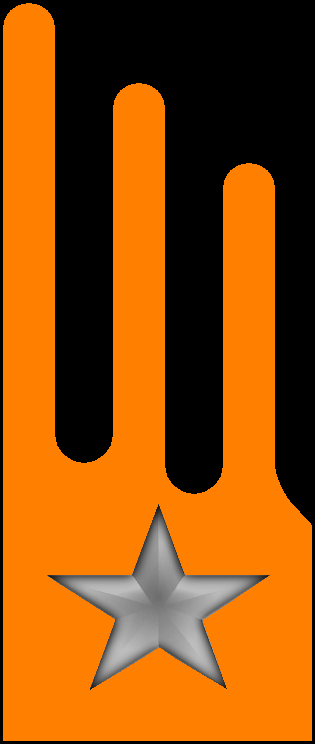
- Regimental gorget patches

The Regiment "Cavalleggeri di Alessandria" (14th) (Italian: Reggimento "Cavalleggeri di Alessandria" (14°) - "Chevau-légers of Alessandria") is an inactive cavalry unit of the Italian Army named for the city of Alessandria in Piedmont. In 1850, shortly after the First Italian War of Independence, the Royal Sardinian Army formed the regiment. The regiment fought in the Second Italian War of Independence, Crimean War, and Third Italian War of Independence. In World War I the regiment fought on the Italian Front. During World War II the regiment was assigned to the 1st Cavalry Division "Eugenio di Savoia", with which the regiment deployed to occupied Yugoslavia on anti-partisan duty. On 17 October 1942, the regiment conducted the last cavalry charge in Italian military history. After the announcement of the Armistice of Cassibile on 8 September 1943, the regiment rode towards Italy, but the lack of orders and pressure by invading German forces, led to the regiment's commander ordering the regiment to dissolve on 14 September 1943.

In 1964, the Italian Army's 3rd Armored Infantry Regiment formed a reconnaissance squadron, which was named Squadron "Cavalleggeri di Alessandria" and received the traditions of the Regiment "Cavalleggeri di Alessandria" (14th). In 1975, the squadron was renamed 14th Reconnaissance Squadron "Cavalleggeri di Alessandria" and assigned to the Infantry Division "Granatieri di Sardegna". In 1979, the squadron was disbanded and the regiment's traditions passed to the Regiment "Lancieri di Montebello" (8th). The regiment's anniversary falls on 24 June 1866, the day of the Battle of Custoza, during which the Regiment "Cavalleggeri di Alessandria" (14th) distinguished itself in a series of charges against the Austrian cavalry, for which the regiment was awarded a Silver Medal of Military Valor. As the regiment is a Chevau-léger unit, its enlisted personnel is addressed as "Chevau-léger" (Italian: Cavalleggero).

== History ==
=== Formation ===
On 3 January 1850, the Royal Sardinian Army formed the Regiment "Cavalleggeri di Alessandria" in Casale Monferrato. To form the new regiment the Regiment "Cavalleggeri di Novara" ceded its 5th Squadron and 6th Squadron, which became the new regiment's 1st Squadron respectively 2nd Squadron, while the Regiment "Cavalleggeri di Aosta" ceded its 5th Squadron and 6th Squadron, which became the new regiment's 3rd Squadron respectively 4th Squadron. To complete the new regiment, the Regiment "Piemonte Reale Cavalleria" ceded its 6th Squadron, which became the new regiment's depot squadron. As one of the Royal Sardinian Army's light cavalry regiments, the regiment's troops wore an orange kepi and were armed with musket, pistol, and sabre. In 1851, the regiment moved from Casale Monferrato to Chambery in the Duchy of Savoy.

On 31 March 1855, the regiment's commander and staff formed the headquarters of the Provisional Cavalry Regiment for the Sardinian expeditionary corps for the Crimean War. On the same date, the Provisional Cavalry Regiment received the 1st Squadrons of the army's other four light cavalry regiments. Afterwards the Provisional Cavalry Regiment's organization was as follows:

- Provisional Cavalry Regiment
  - Staff, Regiment "Cavalleggeri di Alessandria"
  - 1st Squadron - 1st Squadron, Regiment "Cavalleggeri di Novara"
  - 2nd Squadron - 1st Squadron, Regiment "Cavalleggeri di Aosta"
  - 3rd Squadron - 1st Squadron, Regiment "Cavalleggeri di Saluzzo"
  - 4th Squadron - 1st Squadron, Regiment "Cavalleggeri di Monferrato"
  - 5th Squadron - 1st Squadron, Regiment "Cavalleggeri di Alessandria"

On 14 April 1855, in a ceremony in Alessandria King Victor Emmanuel II presented the Provisional Cavalry Regiment with its standard. Afterwards the regiment was shipped from Genoa to Crimea. On 16 August 1855, the Provisional Cavalry Regiment fought in the Battle of the Chernaya. After the Crimean War the regiment was repatriated and, on 18 June 1856, disbanded and its squadrons returned to their original regiments.

=== Italian Wars of Independence ===
==== Second Italian War of Independence ====
On 26 April 1859, the Second Italian War of Independence began. On 29 April, the Imperial Austrian Army crossed the Ticino river, which formed the border between the Kingdom of Sardinia and the Austrian Empire. On 2 May, the Austrians captured Vercelli and began to advance towards the Piedmontese capital Turin. As the French Empire was allied with Piedmont-Sardinia, French Army divisions began to arrive Piedmont, which led to the Austrians to stop their advance and concentrate their forces at Mortara on 9 May. The next day, 10 May, the Regiment "Cavalleggeri di Alessandria" participated in a reconnaissance raid towards Vercelli, which convinced the Austrian commander Feldzeugmeister Ferenc Gyulay to retreat back over the Ticino river into Lombardy. On 19 May, the Austrians left Vercelli, retreated across the Sesia river, and destroyed the bridge over the Sesia at Borgo Vercelli. On 21 May, the first Piedmontese forces forded the river at Villata and Cappuccini. Between 22 and 25 May, the Regiment "Cavalleggeri di Alessandria" participated in raids and attacks against the Austrian held villages of Borgo Vercelli and Palestro. On 27 May 1859, King Victor Emmanuel II awarded the Regiment "Cavalleggeri di Alessandria" a Bronze Medal of Military Valor for the conduct of the regiment's 2nd and 3rd squadrons during the crossing of the Sesia river on 21 May and the operations against Borgo Vercelli and Palestro between 22 and 25 May.

On 29 and 30 May, four Piedmontese division crossed the Sesia at Vercelli to cover the French Army's right flank, while the French crossed the Sesia further North. On 30 May, the Piedmontese 4th Division captured Palestro, which led to the Battle of Palestro the next day, in which the Regiment "Cavalleggeri di Alessandria" participated. On 24 June 1859, the regiment fought in the Battle of Solferino at Madonna della Scoperta.

On 16 September 1859, the Royal Sardinian Army's nine cavalry regiments ceded one squadron each to help form three new Chevau-légers regiments and the three squadrons ceded by the cavalry regiments "Nizza Cavalleria", "Cavalleggeri di Saluzzo", and "Cavalleggeri di Alessandria" were used to form the Regiment "Cavalleggeri di Lodi". On 6 June 1860, the Sardinian War Ministry ordered that the army's light cavalry regiments would be equipped henceforth with sabre and pistol.

Between 1862 and 1864, the regiment operated in Campania and Sicily to suppress the anti-Sardinian revolt, which had erupted in southern Italy after the Kingdom of Sardinia had annexed the Kingdom of the Two Sicilies. On 16 February 1864, the regiment ceded its 1st Squadron to help form the Regiment "Lancieri di Foggia".

==== Third Italian War of Independence ====
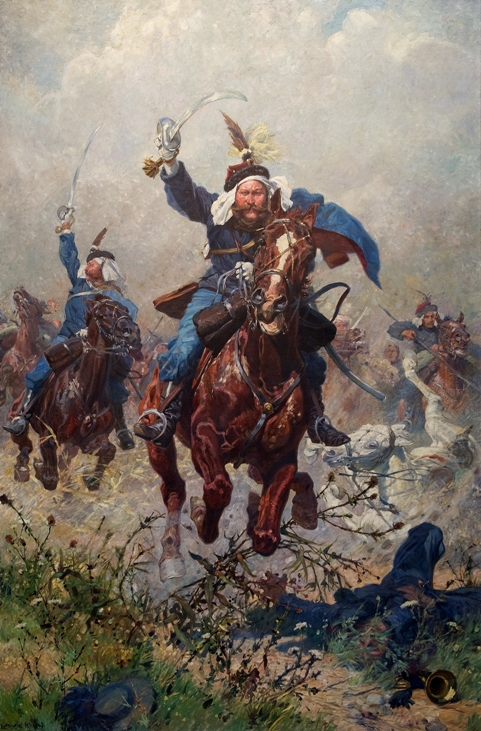
Colonel Maximilian von Rodakowski leading the charge of the Austrian 13th Uhlans Regiment "Graf Trani" against the Regiment "Cavalleggeri di Alessandria" at the Battle of Custoza

On 20 June 1866, the Third Italian War of Independence between the Kingdom of Italy and the Austrian Empire began. During the war the Regiment "Cavalleggeri di Alessandria" formed, together with the Regiment "Cavalleggeri di Saluzzo" and Regiment "Lancieri di Foggia", the Cavalry Brigade of the III Corps of the Army of the Mincio, which operated along the Mincio river. On 24 June, the Army of the Mincio clashed with the Austrian South Army in the Battle of Custoza. In the early hours of the battle the Austrian 13th Uhlans Regiment "Graf Trani" and 1st Hussars Regiment "Kaiser Franz-Joseph" charged the Italian 7th Division and 16th Division at Villafranca. The Uhlans spurned on by their commanding officer, Colonel Maximilian von Rodakowski, rode past the Italian infantry squares into Villafranca, where the Italian fire forced the Austrians to retreat. As the Uhlans returned to their own lines they were charged by the 3rd Squadron of the Regiment "Cavalleggeri di Alessandria". Observing the melee the commanding officer of the "Cavalleggeri di Alessandria", Colonel Enrico Strada, surged forward with the regiment's staff, 1st Squadron, and 2nd Squadron. The Italians pursued the Uhlans to Ganfardine, where the Austrian 1st Hussars Regiment countercharged the Regiment "Cavalleggeri di Alessandria". Colonel Strada rallied his regiment and after a brief scuffle with the Hussars retreated with his regiment towards the Italian lines. The Austrian Hussars then resumed their attack against the Italian 7th Division, but after being charged in their right flank by the 5th Squadron of the Regiment "Lancieri di Foggia" the Hussars retreated. Colonel Strada then led his regiment once more forward to pursue the Hussars. After a brief clash between the Regiment "Cavalleggeri di Alessandria" and seven Austrian cavalry squadrons, which have moved forward to cover the retreat of the 1st Hussars Regiment, both sides retired to their own lines.

For its conduct at Custoza the Regiment "Cavalleggeri di Alessandria" was awarded a Silver Medal of Military Valor, which was affixed to the regiment's standard, while the regiment's commander, Colonel Enrico Strada, was awarded a Gold Medal of Military Valor. Similarly, the commander of the Austrian 13th Uhlans Regiment "Graf Trani", Colonel Maximilian von Rodakowski, was awarded the Knight's Cross of the Order of Leopold for the conduct of his regiment at the Battle of Custoza.

On 10 September 1871, the regiment was renamed 14th Cavalry Regiment (Alessandria) and, on 5 November 1876, Cavalry Regiment "Alessandria" (14th). On 1 October 1883, the regiment ceded its 6th Squadron to help form the Cavalry Regiment "Catania" (22nd). In 1887, the regiment provided personnel and horses for the formation of the 1st Africa Cavalry Squadron and the Mounted Hunters Squadron, which fought in the Italo-Ethiopian War of 1887–1889. On 1 November of the same year, the regiment ceded one of its squadrons to help form the Cavalry Regiment "Vicenza" (24th). In 1895-96, the regiment provided 73 enlisted for units deployed to Italian Eritrea for the First Italo-Ethiopian War. On 16 December 1897, the regiment was renamed Regiment "Cavalleggeri di Alessandria" (14th). On 1 October 1909, the regiment ceded its 3rd Squadron to help form the Regiment "Cavalleggeri di Treviso" (28th). In 1911–12, the regiment provided 108 enlisted to units deployed for the Italo-Turkish War.

=== World War I ===
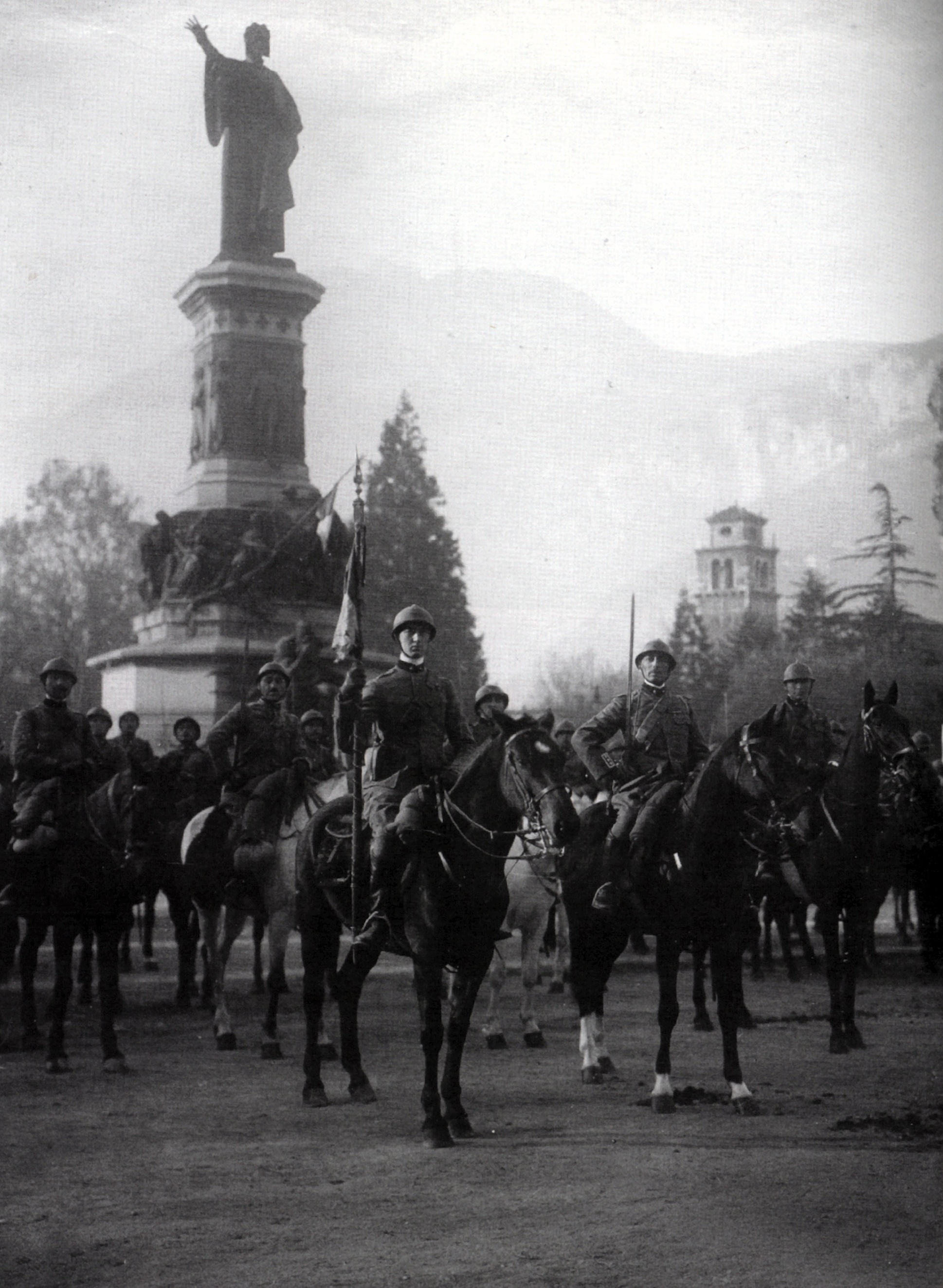
Regiment "Cavalleggeri di Alessandria" (14th) in Trento on 3 November 1918

At the outbreak of World War I the regiment consisted of a command, a depot, and two cavalry groups, with the I Group consisting of three squadrons and the II Group consisting of two squadrons and a machine gun section. On 24 May 1915, the day Italy entered the war, the regiment was assigned to the IV Army Corps. Unlike the cavalry regiments, which were assigned to the army's 1st and 4th cavalry divisions, the Regiment "Cavalleggeri di Alessandria" (14th) was not dismounted for the war. In August 1916, the regiment was assigned to a provisional cavalry brigade, which fought in the Sixth Battle of the Isonzo and was the first Italian unit to enter the city of Gorizia. In 1917, the regiment's depot in Lucca formed the 855th Dismounted Machine Gunners Company as reinforcement for the regiment.

On 24 October 1917, the Imperial German Army and Austro-Hungarian Army began the Battle of Caporetto and already on the first day of the battle the German 14th Army broke through the Italian lines at Kobarid. All mounted Italian cavalry regiments were sent forward to cover the retreat of the Italian 2nd Army and 3rd Army from the Isonzo front. During the night of 24 to 25 October, a battalion of the 279th Infantry Regiment (Brigade "Vicenza"), the 853rd Dismounted Machine Gunners Company of the Regiment "Cavalleggeri di Roma" (20th), and the 854th Dismounted Machine Gunners Company of the Regiment "Lancieri di Milano" (7th) arrived at Stupizza Pass. While the infantry battalion quickly fortified the pass, the two machine gunner companies occupied the mountain flanks on both sides of the pass. Shortly after noon on 25 October, a squadron of the Regiment "Cavalleggeri di Alessandria" (14th) and the commanding general of the Italian 53rd Division, General Maurizio Ferrante Gonzaga, arrived at the pass. General Gonzaga ordered the squadron to carry out an "offensive reconnaissance" and half of the squadron already mounted on their horses immediately charged down the valley, where they dispersed Austro-Hungarian vanguards. The attacking Chevau-légers were stopped by an Austro-Hungarian roadblock, where they came under withering machine gun fire. The squadron's troops then retreated to the pass with heavy losses. Afterwards the regiment covered the retreat of the retreat of the Italian IV Army Corps to the Piave river and fought delaying actions at Sequals, Marano, and Zugliano. When the regiment finally crossed the Piave river it had lost half of its men.

In 1918, after the Italian victory in the Battle of Vittorio Veneto, the regiment, like all cavalry regiments, was ordered to pursue the retreating Austro-Hungarian armies. The regiment advanced through the Lagarina Valley and on 1 November 1918 reached Rovereto. On 3 November 1918, the regiment entered the city Trento, where the regiment accepted the surrender of the Austro-Hungarian III Corps and XIV Corps. The regiment's squadrons, then advanced through the Adige Valley to Mezzocorona and Salurn.

=== Interwar years ===
After the war the Royal Italian Army disbanded the second groups of all thirty cavalry regiments, while the first groups were reduced to two squadrons. On 21 November 1919, 14 cavalry regiments were disbanded and their groups transferred to 14 of the remaining cavalry regiments. One of the disbanded regiments was the Regiment "Cavalleggeri di Treviso" (28th), whose group was renamed II Squadrons Group "Cavalleggeri di Treviso". Afterwards, the squadrons group, which remained based in Florence and retained the disbanded regiment's standard, was assigned to the Regiment "Cavalleggeri di Alessandria" (14th).

On 20 May 1920, the Royal Italian Army disbanded five additional cavalry regiments, among them the Regiment "Cavalleggeri di Lodi" (15th), whose 3rd Squadron of the II Squadrons Group "Cavalleggeri di Udine" was transferred to the Regiment "Cavalleggeri di Alessandria" (14th). On 1 July 1920, the II Squadrons Group "Cavalleggeri di Treviso" and one its squadrons were disbanded. On the same day, the traditions and standard of the Regiment "Cavalleggeri di Treviso" (28th) were entrusted to the Regiment "Cavalleggeri di Alessandria" (14th), which moved from Lucca to Florence and took over the barracks of the disbanded II Squadrons Group "Cavalleggeri di Treviso". On the same day, the Regiment "Cavalleggeri di Alessandria" (14th) was renamed Regiment "Cavalleggeri di Alessandria". On 24 May 1925, the standard of the Regiment "Cavalleggeri di Treviso" (28th) was transferred to the Shrine of the Flags, which at the time was located in Castel Sant'Angelo, for safekeeping.

In 1930, the regiment moved from Florence to Palmanova, where it was assigned, together with the Regiment "Cavalleggeri di Saluzzo" and Regiment "Cavalleggeri di Monferrato", to the 1st Cavalry Division. On 1 January 1934, the regiment left the division. In 1935-36, the regiment provided 15 officers and 220 enlisted for units deployed to East Africa for the Second Italo-Ethiopian War. In October 1938, the Regiment "Cavalleggeri di Alessandria" was once again assigned to the 1st Cavalry Division.

=== World War II ===
At the outbreak of World War II the regiment consisted of a command, a command squadron, the 5th Machine Gunners Squadron, and the I and II squadrons groups, which both consisted of two mounted squadrons. The regiment fielded 37 officers, 37 non-commissioned officers, 798 enlisted troops and 818 horses. The regiment was equipped with one car, six motorcycles, 16 trucks, 36 Breda mod. 30 light machine guns, and 12 Fiat mod. 35 heavy machine guns. The regiment was assigned to the 1st Cavalry Division "Eugenio di Savoia", with which it participated in the Invasion of Yugoslavia. Afterwards the division remained in Yugoslavia as occupation force.

On 17 October 1942, the Regiment "Cavalleggeri di Alessandria" conducted the last cavalry charge in Italian military history. On that day the regiment, together with the LXXXI CC.NN. Battalion, the 3rd Squadron of the I Light Tank Group "San Giusto", and an artillery section with horse drawn 75/27 mod. 11 field guns of the I Group of the 23rd Artillery Regiment "Re", was ordered to search for and, if encountered, destroy Yugoslav Partisans between Perjasica and Primišlje in Croatia. In the afternoon the Italian units arrived in Poloj, where large partisan formations were observed on the regiment's right flank. The Italians formed a circular defense, and quickly found themselves under fierce enemy fire. After the it became clear that the Italians were surrounded by thousands of partisans, the commander of the 1st Cavalry Division "Eugenio di Savoia" ordered the Italian units to retreat to Perjasica. The 1st Squadron of the Regiment "Cavalleggeri di Alessandria" formed the vanguard and once the squadron came under enemy fire it launched a saber charge against the Yugoslav line. The charge was then joined by the regiment's command with the regiment's standard, followed by the 5th Machine Gunners Squadron, the regiment's command squadron, the 3rd Squadron and finally the 2nd and 4th squadrons. The Chevau-légers charged three Yugoslav lines before finally breaking through the encirclement. The regiment suffered 68 killed (including four officers), 61 wounded (including five officers), and the loss of 170 horses. The attached artillery section lost all its guns and 21 horses, while the losses of the attached LXXXI CC.NN. Battalion are not recorded.

On 16 February 1943, the regiment's commanding officer Colonel Guido da Zara was killed in an ambush by Yugoslav Partisans. In March 1943, the regiment was deployed on the Dalmatian coast, with the regiment's headquarters and I Group in Skradin, while the II Group with the 3rd Squadron was in Šibenik and the 4th Squadron in Zablaće (just south of Šibenik). In May 1943, the regiment was transferred to Novi Vinodolski and in August of the same year to Kraljevica. In the evening of 8 September 1943, the Armistice of Cassibile, which ended hostilities between the Kingdom of Italy and the Anglo-American Allies, was announced by General Dwight D. Eisenhower on Radio Algiers and by Marshal Pietro Badoglio on Italian radio. Germany reacted by invading Italy. The announcement of the armistice reached the Regiment "Cavalleggeri di Alessandria" at Kraljevica. On 9 September, the regiment moved to Rijeka, which it found deserted by Italian higher commands. On 12 September, the regiment tried to move to Trieste, but the presence of German troops prevented the regiment from reaching the city. During the night between 13 and 14 September 1943, the regiment's Commander Lieutenant Colonel Raffaele de Bottis conferred with his officers, and then decided to dissolve the regiment. The regiment's standard was hidden and afterwards the regiment's troops dispersed. In 1945, after the war's end the regiment's standard was retrieved and transferred to the Shrine of the Flags in the Vittoriano in Rome for safekeeping.

During the war the regiment's depot in Palmanova formed the following dismounted units:

- III Tank Group "Cavalleggeri di Alessandria", with L6/40 tanks
- IV Tank Group "Cavalleggeri di Alessandria", with L6/40 tanks
- VII Road Movement Battalion "Cavalleggeri di Alessandria"
- XII Road Movement Battalion "Cavalleggeri di Alessandria" (lost on 24 May 1941 in the sinking of the SS Conte Rosso)
- XII Dismounted Group "Cavalleggeri di Alessandria"
- XIII Self-propelled Anti-tank Group "Cavalleggeri di Alessandria", with Semovente da 47/32 self-propelled guns

In summer 1942 the XIII Self-propelled Anti-tank Squadrons Group was attached to the 3rd Cavalry Division "Principe Amedeo Duca d'Aosta", which was sent to the Eastern front in Ukraine. In December 1942, the division and its units were destroyed during the Red Army's Operation Little Saturn.

=== Cold War ===
During the Cold War the Italian Army's primary fighting force in Central Italy was the Infantry Division "Granatieri di Sardegna". The division's 3rd Armored Infantry Regiment, which was based in Persano near Naples, also served as training unit for the Armored and Mechanized Troops School in Caserta and included, unlike other armored infantry regiments, a self-propelled artillery battery. On 1 October 1964, the regiment also formed a reconnaissance squadron, which was named Squadron "Cavalleggeri di Alessandria" and received the traditions of the Regiment "Cavalleggeri di Alessandria" (14th).

During the 1975 army reform the Italian Army disbanded the regimental level. Consequently, on 31 October 1975, the 3rd Armored Infantry Regiment was disbanded and the next day the squadron, which had been renamed 14th Reconnaissance Squadron "Cavalleggeri di Alessandria" on 1 October of the same year, was transferred to the Infantry Division "Granatieri di Sardegna". Afterwards, the squadron moved from Persano to Civitavecchia near Rome. On 1 November 1976, the Infantry Division "Granatieri di Sardegna" was disbanded and its remaining units assigned to the newly formed Mechanized Brigade "Granatieri di Sardegna". On 30 June 1979, the 14th Reconnaissance Squadron "Cavalleggeri di Alessandria" was disbanded and the traditions of the Regiment "Cavalleggeri di Alessandria" (14th) were transferred to the Regiment "Lancieri di Montebello" (8th).
