= Cesare Lomaglio =

- Born: 10 October 1887; Asti, Kingdom of Italy
- Died: 3 May 1968 (aged 80); Asti, Italy
- Military career
- Allegiance: Kingdom of Italy
- Branch: Royal Italian Army
- Service years: 1907–1947
- Rank: Lieutenant General
- Commands: Regiment "Lancieri di Novara" (5th); 1st Cavalry Division Eugenio di Savoia
- Conflicts: Italo-Turkish War; Battle of the Two Palms; World War I; Battles of the Isonzo; Battle of Vittorio Veneto; World War II; Axis invasion of Yugoslavia; Italian occupation of Croatia
- Awards: Silver Medal of Military Valor; Bronze Medal of Military Valor (three times); Order of Merit of the Italian Republic

Count Cesare Alessandro Giuseppe Maria Lomaglio (Asti, 10 October 1887 – 3 May 1968) was an Italian general during World War II.

== Biography ==
He was born in Asti in 1887, the son of Giovanni Lomaglio and Maria Alfassio Grimaldi of Bellino, both belonging to ancient families of the Piedmontese nobility. After attending the Military Academy of Modena in 1907-1909, he graduated on 8 October 1909 with the rank of cavalry second lieutenant and was assigned to the 13th Cavalry Regiment "Cavalleggeri di Monferrato" Regiment. From 7 July 1910 he was transferred to the 16th Cavalry Regiment "Cavalleggeri di Lucca", and in 1911-1912 he fought in Libya during the Italo-Turkish War, earning a Bronze Medal of Military Valor for his conduct during the battle of the Two Palms on March 12, 1912. Having returned to Italy, he participated in the First World War as a staff officer in the 43rd and 53rd Divisions, participating in the battles of the Isonzo and the battle of Vittorio Veneto and earning two more Bronze and a Silver Medal of Military Valor.

After the war he held various positions in the general staff of the military divisions of Bari, Cuneo and Turin and in the "Cavalleggeri Guide" Regiment in the early 1920s, rising to the rank of major. He was then transferred to the "Cavalleggeri di Alessandria" Regiment. On March 3, 1924 he married in Turin the noblewoman Vittoria Maria Luigia Mapelli Mozzo, with whom he had no children. After promotion to lieutenant colonel on 1 May 1927, he remained with the "Cavalleggeri di Alessandria" until December 1928, when he was appointed, from 1 January 1929, aide-de-camp to King Victor Emmanuel III, for four years, until 31 December 1932. He then returned to the general staff and held various commands in the Turin Army Corps and in the "Piemonte Cavalleria" Regiment (2nd) in Udine, after which he became commander of the "Lancers of Novara" Regiment in Verona from 1 October 1935 to 31 December 1937. From 1 January 1937, Lomaglio was promoted to colonel and given command of the central school for motorized troops in Civitavecchia (from 21 January to 1 September 1938), after which he was appointed Chief of Staff of the Italian armed forces command of the Dodecanese, from 2 September 1938 to 5 August 1940.

On 31 May 1940, ten days before Italy entered the Second World War, Lomaglio was promoted to brigadier general. After a short period at the disposal of the army chief of staff in Rome (1 September – 19 November), from 20 November 1940 he assumed command of the 1st Cavalry Division Eugenio di Savoia, participating in April 1941 in the Axis invasion of Yugoslavia. Following the end of that campaign, the Division remained in Croatia for garrison and anti-partisan duties. On 1 January 1943 Lomaglio was promoted to major general. At the time of the proclamation of the Armistice of Cassibile, on the evening of 8 September 1943, he was in Sussak, at the divisional headquarters, and had no clear instructions to oppose the Germans. After being stuck in Fiume for a few days, on 22 September 1943, following an agreement with the German commands, he was able to leave for Trieste and return to his residence in Montiglio Monferrato, near Asti, where he remained until the end of the war. From 22 September 1945 he resumed service at the territorial command of Turin, where he chaired the commission of inquiry on the loss of the funds of the Fourth Army following the Armistice. On 2 June 1947 he was transferred to the army reserve, with the rank of lieutenant general. He then became honorary adjutant general of the exiled Umberto II. On the proposal of the Presidency of the Council of Ministers, on 2 June 1956, he was awarded the honor of Grand Officer of the Order of Merit of the Italian Republic. He died in his native Asti in 1968.
