= 1st Cavalry Division "Eugenio di Savoia" =

WW2 Royal Italian Army unit

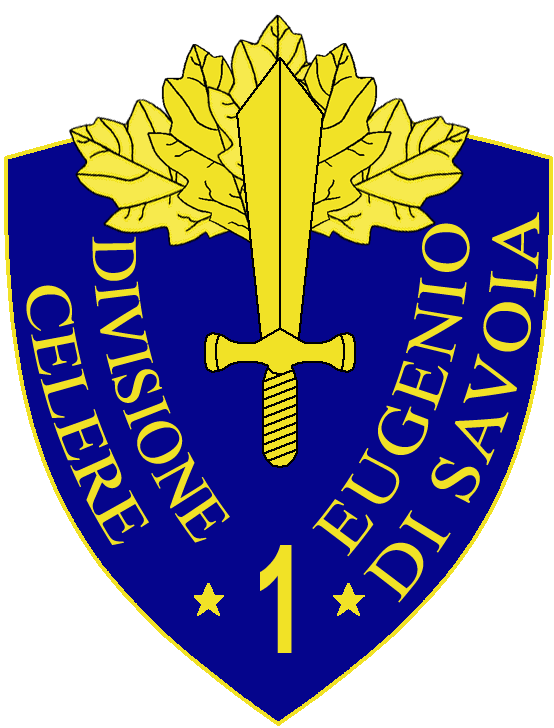
- 1st Cavalry Division "Eugenio di Savoia" insignia
- Active: 1930–1943
- Country: Kingdom of Italy
- Branch: Royal Italian Army
- Type: Cavalry
- Size: Division
- Part of: XI Corps
- Garrison/HQ: Udine
- Engagements: World War II; Yugoslavia

Commanders
- Notable commanders: Federico Ferrari Orsi

Insignia
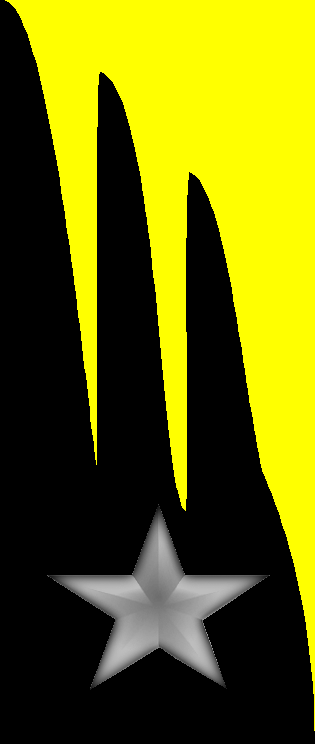
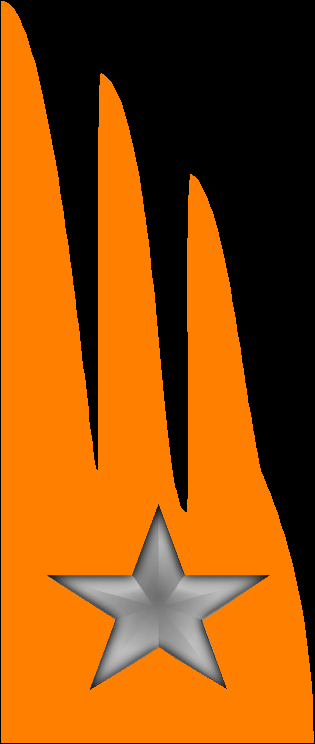
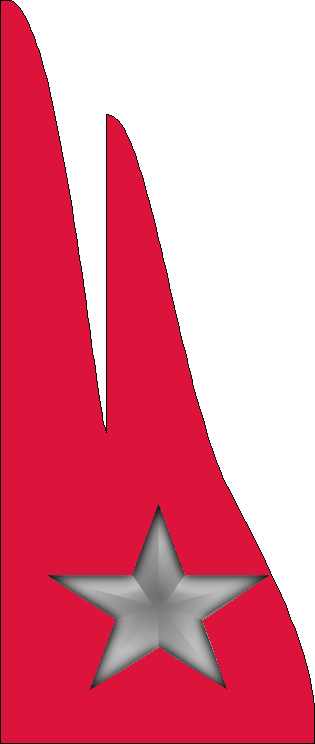
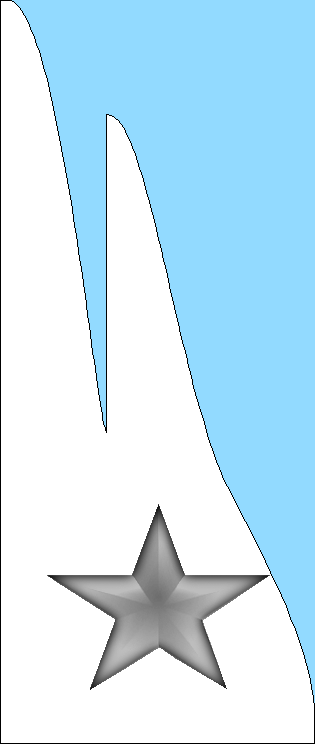
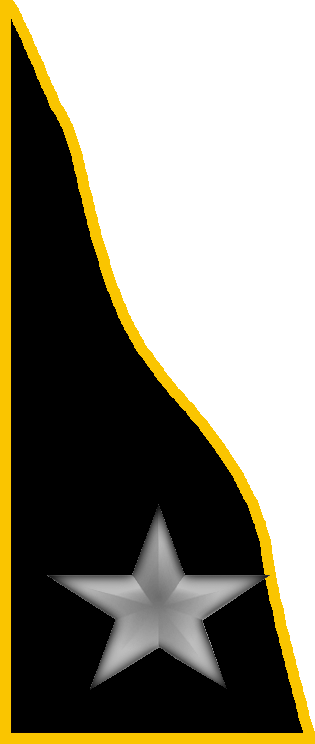
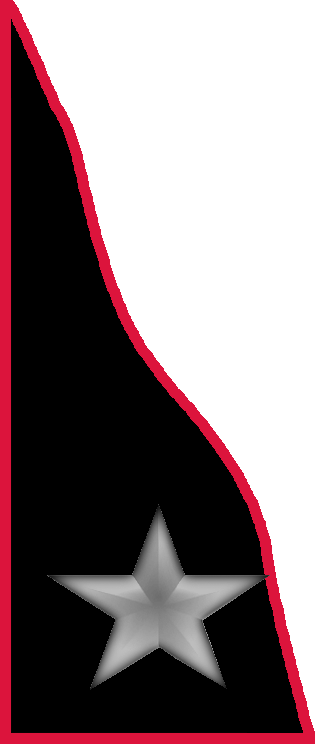
- Identification symbol: Eugenio di Savoia gorget patches

The 1st Cavalry Division "Eugenio di Savoia" (Italian: 1ª Divisione celere "Eugenio di Savoia") was a cavalry or "Celere" (Fast) division of the Royal Italian Army during World War II. The division was mobilized in 1940 and took part in the Invasion of Yugoslavia. The division was assigned to the XI Corps in Ljubljana and remained in Yugoslavia as occupation force on the Dalmatian coast. After the Armistice of Cassibile on 8 September 1943 the division was disbanded by the Germans.

== History ==
The division was formed on 17 April 1930 as 1st Fast Division in the city of Udine in Friuli. Although not officially sanctioned the division is considered to be the heir of the 1st Cavalry Division of Friuli, which fought in World War I and consisted of the I and II cavalry brigades and was based in Udine. On 15 June 1930 the I Cavalry Brigade, with the regiments Regiment "Cavalleggeri di Saluzzo", Regiment "Cavalleggeri di Monferrato", and Regiment "Cavalleggeri di Alessandria" entered the division. The following year the Light Artillery Regiment was formed and assigned to the division.

In January 1933 the Regiment "Piemonte Reale Cavalleria" replaced the Regiment "Cavalleggeri di Monferrato". On 1 January 1935 the division and brigade received the name "Eugenio di Savoia". On the same date the brigade was reorganized with the Regiment "Cavalleggeri di Alessandria" being replaced by the 11th Bersaglieri Regiment, and the I Light Tank Group "San Giusto" joining the brigade.

On 1 February 1938 the I Cavalry Brigade "Eugenio di Savoia" was dissolved and its three regiments came under direct command of the division. In October of the same year the Regiment "Cavalleggeri di Alessandria" returned to the division, which in turn lost the Regiment "Piemonte Reale Cavalleria".

=== World War II ===
On 30 March 1941 the division ceded its 1st Fast Artillery Regiment "Eugenio di Savoia" with the II and III motorized groups to the 27th Infantry Division "Brescia", which was fighting in the Western Desert Campaign. On 3 April the Regiment "Nizza Cavalleria" was attached to the division for the upcoming Invasion of Yugoslavia. Afterwards the division remained in Yugoslavia as occupation force. On 23 June the division lost its last artillery group, which was transferred to the 3rd Cavalry Division "Principe Amedeo Duca d'Aosta" to form a horse artillery regiment for the latter division's upcoming deployment to the Eastern front.

On 17 October 1941 the Regiment "Cavalleggeri di Alessandria" conducted the last cavalry charge by an Italian military unit: encircled by a group of Yugoslav Partisans near Poloj in Croatia the regiment launched repeated nighttime saber charges against the partisans and despite suffering heavy casualties, the charge succeeded and the regiment broke through the encirclement.

After the Armistice of Cassibile was announced on 8 September 1943 the division tried to rally in Rijeka, but by 13 September 1943 it was dissolved by invading German forces and ceased to exist.

== Organization ==
1st Cavalry Division "Eugenio di Savoia" organization in 1940

The division had undergone a level of mechanization and fielded two cavalry regiments, a Bersaglieri regiment, a motorized artillery regiment, and a light tank group. The squadrons of the cavalry regiments were horse-mounted and, other than a motorcycle company, the Bersaglieri were issued with bicycles. The light tank group had a total of 61 L3/35s and L6/40 tanks.

- 1st Cavalry Division "Eugenio di Savoia", in Udine
  - Headquarters
    - Command Squadron
    - 2 × Carabinieri Section
    - 18th Field Post Office
    - 1st Cavalry Division Command Transport Squad
  - Regiment "Cavalleggeri di Saluzzo", in Pordenone
    - Command Squadron
    - I Squadrons Group
    - II Squadrons Group
    - 5th Machine Gun Squadron
  - Regiment "Cavalleggeri di Alessandria", in Palmanova
    - Command Squadron
    - I Squadrons Group
    - II Squadrons Group
    - 5th Machine Gun Squadron
  - 11th Bersaglieri Regiment, in Gradisca d'Isonzo (attached to the 158th Infantry Division "Zara" in 1943)
    - Command Company
    - XV Bersaglieri Battalion
    - XXVII Bersaglieri Battalion
    - XXXIII Bersaglieri Battalion
    - 11th Bersaglieri Motorcyclists Company
    - 11th Cannons Company (47/32 mod. 35 anti-tank guns)
  - 1st Fast Artillery Regiment "Eugenio di Savoia", in Udine (transferred to the 27th Infantry Division "Brescia" on 30 March 1941)
    - Command Unit
    - I Group (75/27 mod. 12 horse-drawn guns)
    - II Group (75/27 mod. 11 field guns)
    - III Group (75/27 mod. 11 field guns)
    - 1 × Anti-aircraft battery (20/65 mod. 35 anti-aircraft guns)
    - Ammunition and Supply Unit
  - I Light Tank Group "San Giusto", in Codroipo (L3/33 tankettes and L6/40 tanks)
  - 171st Anti-tank Company (47/32 mod. 35 anti-tank guns; transferred to the 52nd Infantry Division "Torino" for the deployment in the Soviet Union)
  - 101st Mixed Engineer Company
  - 71st Medical Section
    - 57th Field Hospital
    - 58th Field Hospital
    - 59th Field Hospital
    - 10th Surgical Unit
  - 91st Supply Section
  - 211th Mixed Transport Unit
    - 34th Transport Section
    - 53rd Transport Section
    - 852nd Transport Section
    - 854th Transport Section

Attached during the Invasion of Yugoslavia in 1941:

- Regiment "Nizza Cavalleria"
  - Command Squadron
  - I Squadrons Group
  - II Squadrons Group
  - 5th Machine Gun Squadron

== Military honors ==
For its conduct while serving with the 27th Infantry Division "Brescia" during the Western Desert campaign the President of Italy awarded on 7 December 1951 to the division's 1st Cavalry Artillery Regiment Italy's highest military honor, the Gold Medal of Military Valor.

- 1st Cavalry Artillery Regiment on 7 December 1951

== Commanding officers ==
The division's commanding officers were:

- Generale di Divisione Ettore Bastico (January 1932 - September 1933)
- Generale di Divisione Augusto de Pignier (September 1933 - 15 September 1934)
- Generale di Divisione Riccardo Moizo (16 September 1934 - 30 September 1935)
- Generale di Divisione Mario Caracciolo di Feroleto (1 October 1935 - 12 December 1936)
- Generale di Divisione Emilio Gamerra (13 December 1936 - 15 March 1938)
- Generale di Brigata Nino Sozzani (acting, 16 March - 20 August 1940)
- Generale di Divisione Federico Ferrari Orsi (5 October 1938 - 15 November 1940)
- Generale di Brigata Giuseppe Lombard (acting, 16-19 November 1940)
- Generale di Divisione Cesare Lomaglio (20 November 1940 - 9 September 1943)

== See also ==
- List of military units named after people
