= Royal Sardinian Army =

Land forces of the Savoyard state, from 1414 to 1861

- Flag of the Royal Sardinian Army
- Active: 1414–1861
- Country: Duchy of Savoy; Kingdom of Sardinia
- Type: Army
- Role: Defense of the interior and borders of the Kingdom of Sardinia's continental portion (Piedmont, Liguria, Savoy and the Aosta Valley)
- Size: ~8,500 (in 1815); 79,000 (in 1859)
- Engagements: War of the Mantuan Succession; Nine Years' War; War of the Spanish Succession; War of the Polish Succession; War of the Austrian Succession; First Italian War of Independence; Crimean War; Second Italian War of Independence; Piedmontese Campaign in Central Italy

The Royal Sardinian Army (also the Sardinian Army, the Royal Sardo-Piedmontese Army, the Savoyard Army, or the Piedmontese Army) was the army of the Duchy of Savoy and then of the Kingdom of Sardinia, which was active from 1416 until it became the Royal Italian Army on 4 May 1861.

Generally, the term "Savoyard Army" is used for the period when the rulers of Savoy held only the title of Duke, while "Sardinian Army" is preferred for the period after they obtained the title of King of Sardinia in 1720.

== History ==
=== Origins ===
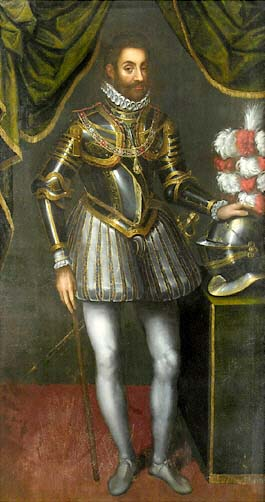
Emmanuel Philibert, Duke of Savoy, the major reformer of the Savoyard Army in the 16th century

The Savoyard Army was officially established in the 15th century when the Duchy of Savoy was created. During this period, the army of the Savoyard lands was concentrated at bases in Piedmont and the Aosta Valley, where it was maintained by the local feudal lords who in exchange for the command of some regiments, maintained them for state service and stationed them on the land in the meantime. It was Duke Emmanuel Philibert who was largely responsible for the radical reforms of the army which made it a stable component of the state and disconnected it from the local feudatories at the same time. As part of this, he created the "peasant militia" on 5 July 1566. With this, the command of the army officially passed into the hands of the Duke of Savoy. Since there were no limits on age or length of service, many soldiers remained in service for a very long time, which had a deleterious impact on the army. There was little or nothing in the way of training and the resulting force left a lot to be desired on the campaign.

=== 17th and 18th centuries ===
The Savoyard army engaged in many conflicts of the 17th century including the Thirty Years War, Piedmontese Civil War, and War of the Mantuan Succession. In 1630, during the latter conflict, it consisted of 25,000 soldiers plus a large peasant militia. Of these 25,000, 6,500 were joining Imperial and Spanish forces in besieging French ones at Casale, 6,000 were garrisoning Savoy proper; and 12,500 were scattered throughout the rest of Piedmont.

In the seventeenth century, the Piedmontese army underwent notable reforms. The cause of these substantial changes was the foreign policy undertaken by the Savoyard government and new internal conditions. During the first half of the seventeenth century, the Savoyard army was not a solid force, but varied significantly in periods of peace and war and was essentially composed of regiments recruited from the nobility in the pay of the Duke, regiments of mercenaries, and Protestant regiments (mostly consisting of French Huguenots). In 1664, "proprietary" regiments of the Duke were first created, which bore the Duke's coat of arms as a flag rather than the arms of their individual commanders.

Seven years later, in 1671, the army was also given a uniform, which was light grey for almost all units, much like that which had recently been adopted by the French Royal Army, which the Ducal army had frequently encountered (as opponents and allies) in the frequent wars of the era. In this period, the Piedmontese army was very open to innovations and was constantly modernising, especially during the reign of Victor Amadeus II. The two most important reforms of these years were probably the creation of a specialised group of grenadiers and the abolition of the pikemen, both of which took place in 1685. The second of these reforms in particular anticipated the motion of travel throughout Europe – in fact, the French and the Spanish only abolished their pikemen some fifteen years later, while the Swedes still had a third of their infantry equipped with pikes in 1720.

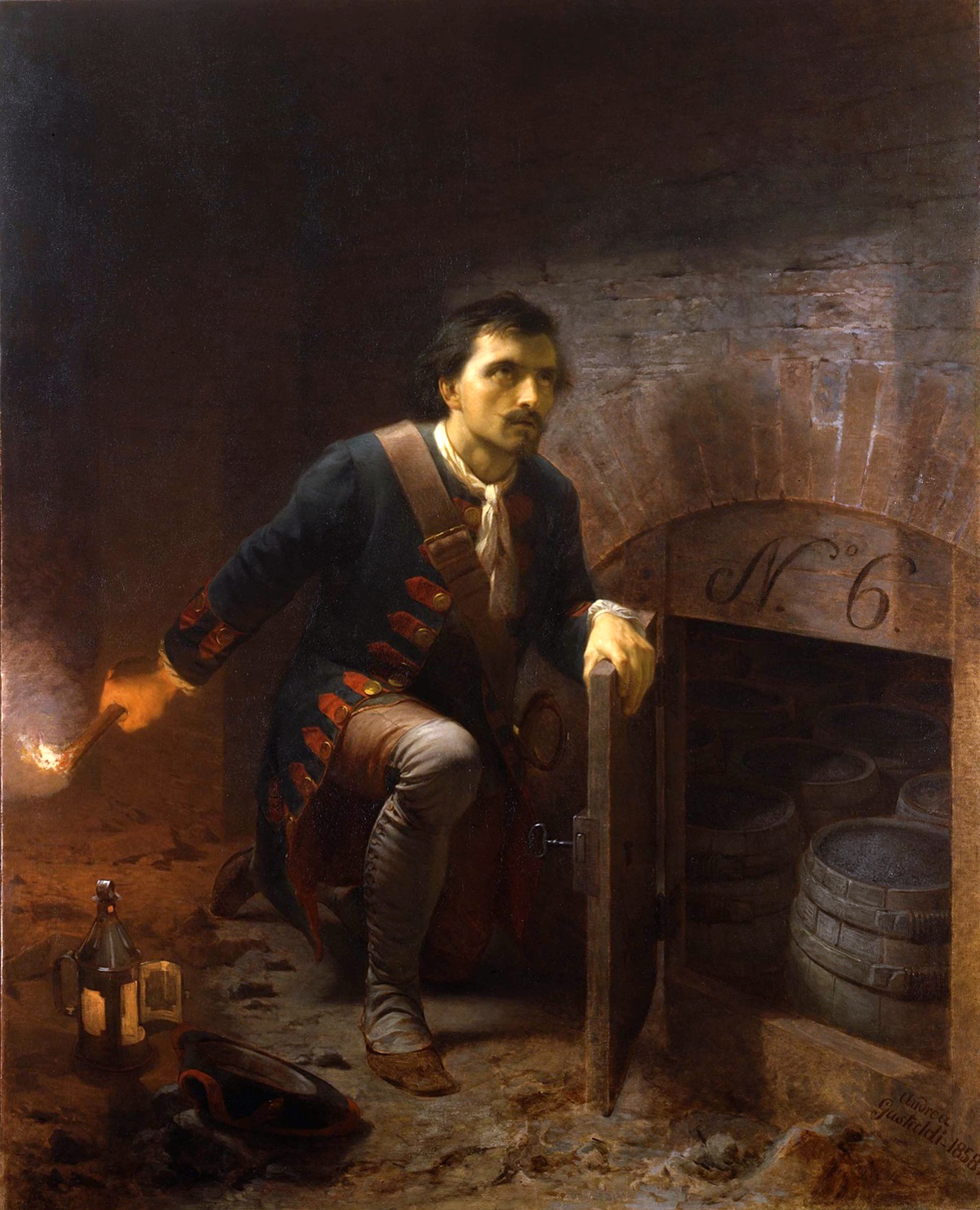
1858 portrait of the Savoyard soldier Pietro Micca by Andrea Gastaldi

Also important, somewhat later, was the Regulation of 1709, which was inspired by the discipline of the Prussian Army observed during the Siege of Turin and by the firing tactics of British and Dutch troops. Thus, the fire of platoons in serried ranks was adopted instead of files in open ranks. The difference was that when firing in files, the soldiers were deployed in four or more files separated by four metres and all the soldiers in one file fired at the same time, with a set interval between the fire of each file, making a more constant fire possible. However, with the fire in platoons, the soldiers were separated into three close files and their front was divided into platoons, in each of which the soldiers of the three files fired at the same time, followed by the other platoons at a regular interval. This system remained the standard for all units throughout the first half of the 18th century.

Throughout the century, there was a general tendency to the expansion of the army. In 1691, it contained 12 regiments of infantry, 3 of dragoons and 2 of cavalry; in 1747, it exceeded 32 regiments of infantry, but the cavalry continued to be formed of 2 regiments, while the dragoons had expanded to 5 regiments. With respect to numbers, we know that in 1774, the total number of Savoyard troops reached 100,000 individuals. In that year a regulation was introduced concerning the length of permanent military service. The king maintained control of the troops, supported by a defence staff, composed of adjutants and 28 experienced generals, all of aristocratic origin (nobles held 78% of the positions in the officer ranks), while in the various ranks of the infantry and cavalry forces, the bourgeois formed 20%. The rest of the army was manned by the proletariat.

=== Nineteenth century ===
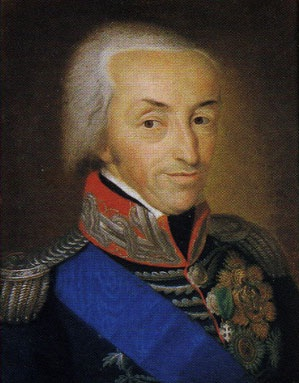
Victor Emmanuel I, who established the Royal Carabinieri in 1814

After the Armistice of Cherasco in 1796 and the failure of the Kingdom of Sardinia's attempt to prevent the Napoleonic invasion, the Sardinian Army was gradually demobilised and was converted into the forces of the Subalpine Republic and then of the Napoleonic Kingdom of Italy.

After the restoration of the kingdom in 1815, Victor Emmanuel I ordered the reconstruction of the Piedmontese army, organised into ten brigades of infantry and supported by cavalry and artillery. These were divided into two large armies, each of which contained two divisions and a reserve division. The total number of Sardinian troops, in the beginning of 1815, numbered around 8,500. By the War of the Seventh Coalition, the army had 13 line infantry regiments, 7 cavalry regiments, 12 provincial infantry regiments, and three chasseur regiments. There also existed a carabinieri formation, which was in charge of internal security, and was also the only cavalry unit to possess a significant number of horses. Despite their inadequate training, the newly mustered Sardinian regiments deployed alongside Austrian forces during the conflict to defend the Savoyard border with France.

Under Victor Emmanuel II, the Royal Sardinian Army was changed in many respects, with an increase in numbers and in the quality of the forces. In 1858, before the outbreak of the Second Italian War of Independence, a new military code was introduced by the king, which regularised the period of military service, establishing it as five years of active service, then 6 years in reserve, up to the age of thirty, with 50 days of obligatory training and instruction per year. The active service was divided into two kinds: ordinanza and provinciale. The first included service in the Royal carabinieri, the armourers, the musicians, the musketeers, and the volunteers, while the second consisted of all the other soldiers who were obliged to remain in the army for 8 years unless the government ordered otherwise.

In this reform, criminals condemned to forced labour, imprisonment, and exile were excluded from military service, as were those guilty of crimes relating to the penal code, men condemned by foreign courts to similar punishments, and the executors of justice, including judges, magistrates, their children, their adjutants and the children of their adjutants. The Piedmontese army in this period had a total force of 79,000 men (roughly 22,000 of which were officers and 56,000 were regular troops), in addition to around 20,000 officers and soldiers in non-Piedmontese volunteer forces, like the Hunters of the Alps. The volunteers in the regular army numbered around 20,000 men. The conscripts were chosen by lot and could escape by making a payment or substituting a relative. The division took place on the basis of age and the oldest soldiers (provided they were literate) were made corporals. From these, the sergeants were chosen on the basis of merit. After the unification of Italy the army became the Royal Italian Army.

== Organisation ==
In the early nineteenth century, the soldiers of the Sardinian army had the following social composition: 65% farmers, 25% labourers and artisans, 10% bourgeois and aristocrats. Only 20% were literate and a mere 5% had received secondary education. In the regiments, there was a school for the soldiers in which they could learn to read, write, and keep accounts. According to the regulations of 1853, the pay of the average soldier in peacetime was 15 centesimi, rising to 25 in wartime, in addition to a ration of bread, 830g of wood in summer and 1660g in winter (double for junior officers), and a daily subsidy for the wives of the soldiers and two rations of bread per day.

=== Infantry ===
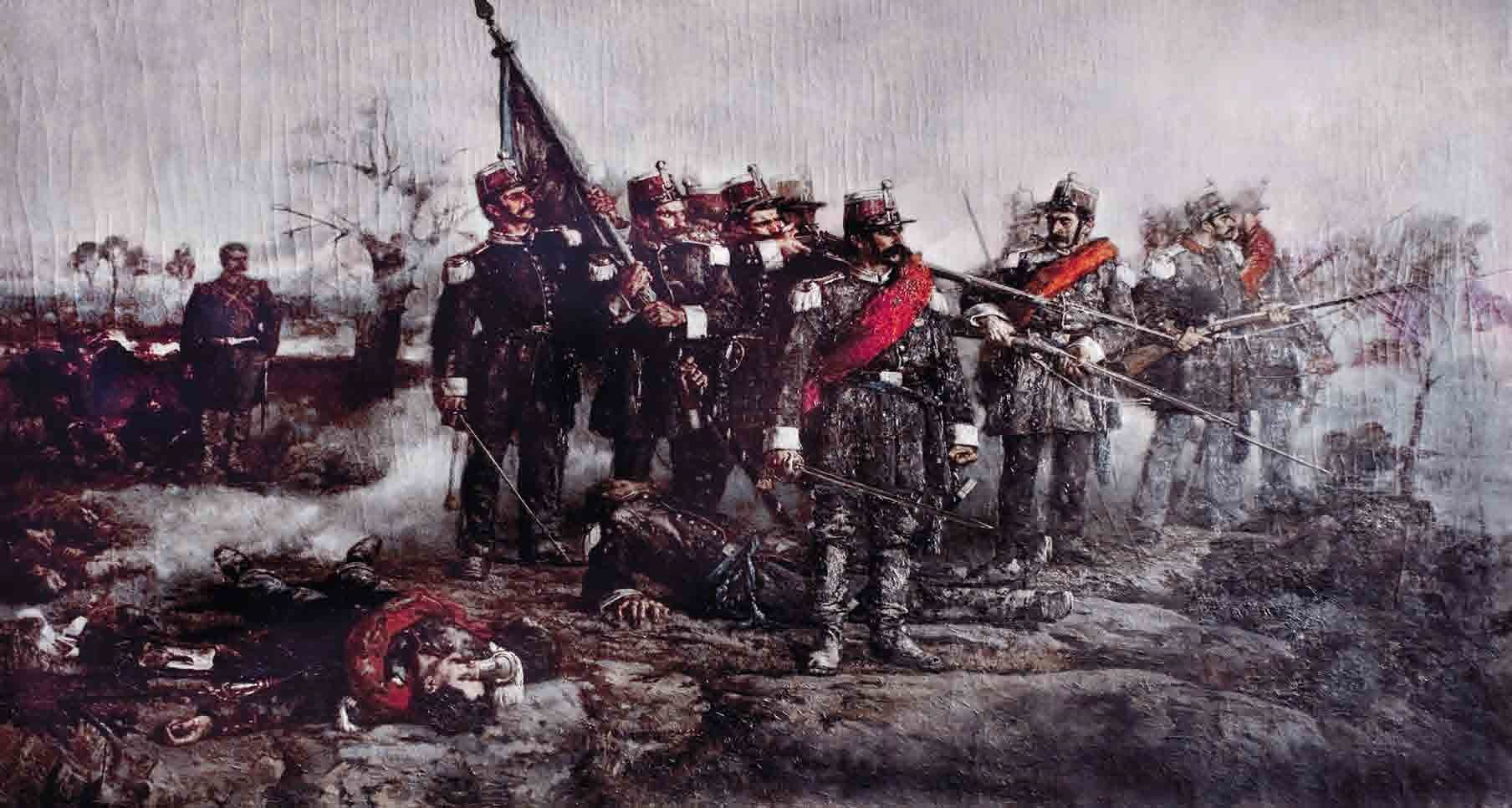
Group of infantry at the Battle of Novara, 1849

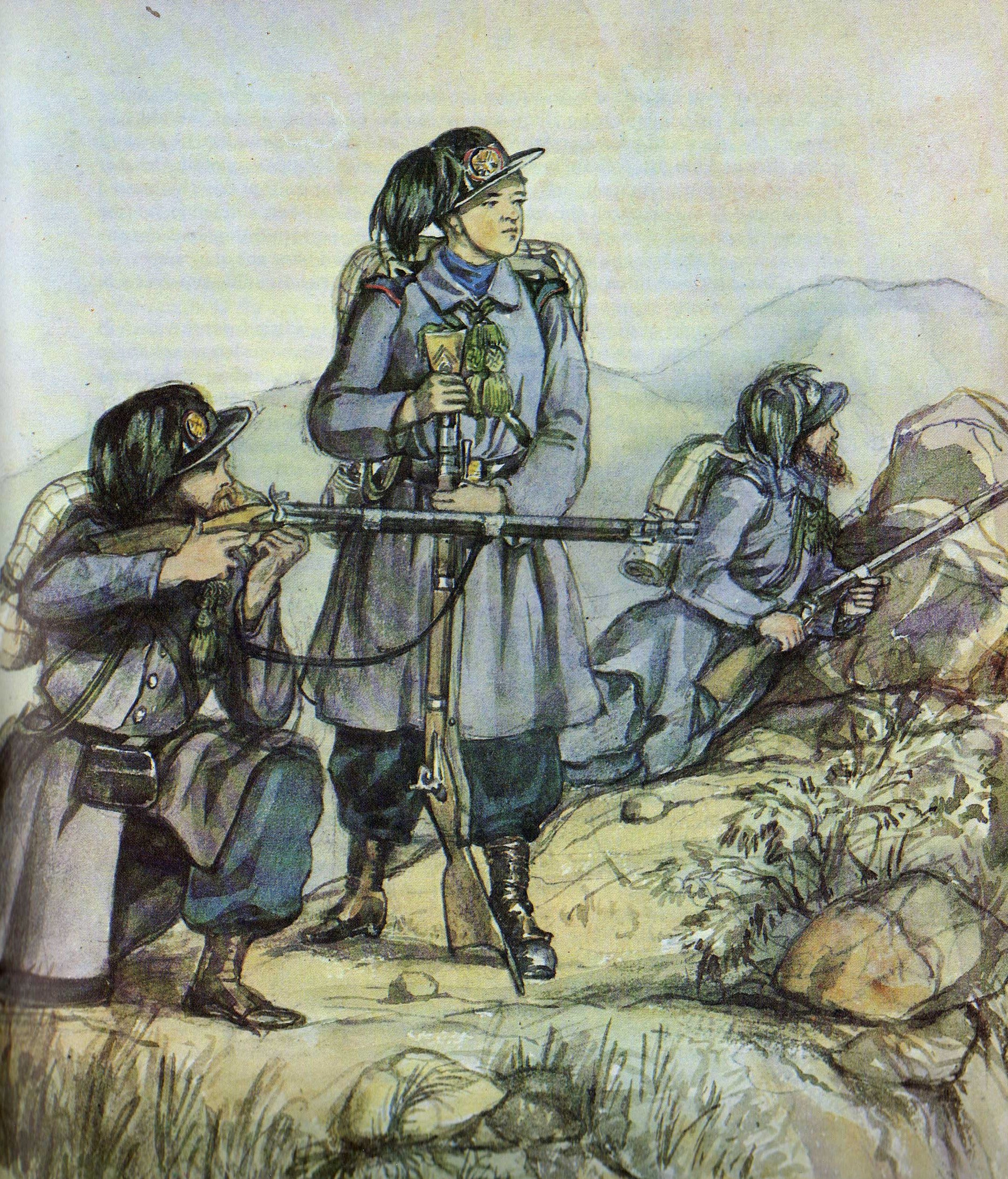
Group of Bersaglieri, the special troops of the Sardinian army during the Risorgimento

The infantry were the backbone of the Sardinian army and were subdivided into different types: National Service Infantry, Light legion, infantry for external security, provincial infantry, legions of the encampments, French corps, and the territorial militia.

National Service Infantry
consisted of unmounted personnel (fusiliers and grenadiers) recruited from the territories of the Duchy of Savoy and were easily employed in the territory. In peacetime, it contained around 20,000 individuals, but in times of war, it could increase to 50,000 men.
Royal Light Legion
was a special force established in 1774 as border guards in order to prevent smuggling and protect the borders. The personnel were mostly foreigners or at least not linked with the territory in which they were stationed, in order to prevent favouritism in their dealings with the local populations. The maximum total number of men serving in this corps was 2,100. When the Royal Sardinian Army became the Royal Italian Army, this corps became the modern Guardia di Finanza.
Foreign Service Infantry
consisted of volunteers from the regions and states bordering the Savoyard domains (i.e. France, Switzerland, Protestants, Germany, Sicily, Lombardy). The total number of men was around 1,270.
Provincial Infantry
was established at the beginning of the seventeenth century, with a fixed period of service of 20 years and non-professional personnel. The fixed period was reduced to 18 years in special cases for Savoyards and to 12 years for Niçards. In 1792, the contingent contained 20,774 men.
Free Corps
were a type of corps shared with several other armies in the 18th century, including the Prussian and Imperial and took their name from the name of the commander who maintained them for the state.
Territorial Militia
was the corps of volunteers recruited from the local area who served predominantly in mountainous regions, especially the Alps, and kept watch over small villages and settlements in rough and flat areas. The corps also carried out scouting and surveying duties for the regular army.

To improve the quality of the operations of the infantry, there was a training system in Piedmont with training camps, modelled on the armed forces of France and Germany. The most important of these training camps was located in Briga Alta and was commanded by a General Inspector.

=== Cavalry ===
The Sardinian cavalry, particularly noted for its valour in battle, was entirely of Savoyard extraction. The force which distinguished itself in the War of the Spanish Succession had 2,420 horsemen at its disposal in peacetime, but could rapidly double its numbers in times of war. The Sardinian cavalry included 3 corps of bodyguards to the sovereign (120 in peacetime and 260 during wars) and 6 regular regiments, including the famous "Piemonte Reale Cavalleria" and "Savoia Cavalleria" which were retained during the Kingdom of Italy and then also in the Republic.

On 19 March 1852, a general reorganisation of the cavalry came into force which led to the following arrangement:

- 4x regiments of dragoons: "Nizza Cavalleria", "Piemonte Reale Cavalleria", "Savoia Cavalleria", "Genova Cavalleria"
- 5x regiments of chevau-légers: "Cavalleggeri di Novara", "Cavalleggeri di Novara", "Cavalleggeri di Saluzzo", "Cavalleggeri di Monferrato", "Cavalleggeri di Alessandria"
- 1x squadron of guides: Squadrone "Guide"

Every regiment had a general staff, 4–6 active squadrons and 1 reserve squadron. Each squadron contained 5 officers, 6 junior officers, 2 trumpeters, 2 blacksmiths, 1 saddler, 130 soldiers and 100 horses.

=== Artillery ===
The Sardinian artillery was very similar to that of the French, organised in brigades each of which contained 4/6 pieces moved by 300 horses and assembled on-site by soldiers. The artillery was divided into field and mountain artillery, as well as siege artillery (mortars and howitzers). A large number of the artillery personnel were recruited from Biella, which was also where the industry that produced the artillery was located. In battle, five pieces of artillery were assigned to each infantry brigade and four pieces for each cavalry brigade.

=== Specialists ===
The regiment of military engineers was based at Casale Monferrato and consisted of two battalions, each containing 5 companies, which each contained: 4 officers, 6 junior officers, 2 trumpeters, and 88 men. The companies were assigned in various arrangements to the divisions and were given various tasks, including the construction of telegraph links. Civilian companies also came to be involved in the work of these engineers.

== Armament ==
The infantry were armed with bayonet rifles and a dagger secured to the body with a leather strap, as well as a bandolier for the rifle. The officers did not have firearms; they only carried melee weapons.

New models of rifles were adopted in 1844, with a first attempt at using percussion rifles. However, the transition from the firearms which used fire strikers to more modern weapons that fired using an "Eggs" capsule was completed only in 1859. All rifles were equipped with bayonets with the Laukart attachment system, which meant that they could be clipped onto the rifle without obstructing fire.

The musket developed in parallel with this. The first nineteenth-century models appeared in 1833 and they were modified in 1844 to make them more like actual infantry rifles, except shorter and more manageable on account of their lighter weight.

The carbine was mainly given to sharpshooters, but was also the distinctive weapon of the carabinieri.

The Sardinian army was first equipped with pistols in 1847 (although some were already in use from 1844). These included the large cavalry pistol which was considered a weapon of last resort as an unsatisfactory compromise between a pistol and a musket. The pistol and cavalry pistol bullets were spherical and hollow with a diameter of 16.6 mm and an explosive payload of 2.5 g.

From the eighteenth century, the cavalry were armed with carbines which were very accurate over short distances. The horses were mostly bay-coloured animals imported from German and they served for 4–6 years. A sixth were female. In the nineteenth century, the carabinieri were introduced and they formed the main cavalry force, especially distinguishing themselves in the First Italian War of Independence with their splendid sabre charges. The dragoons were equipped very differently – with long bayonetted rifles (although they retained the use of the sabre as traditional).

The typical artillery cannon of the Sardinian army was the mod.704 rear-load saker, which was regularly used until 1848. The heavy artillery was characterised by long cannons (8-16-32 pound culverins).

== Officers ==
=== Junior officers ===
The junior officers were drawn largely from the ordinary soldiers on the basis of merit and ability. Some of them were trained in various regimental schools, while others were sent to specialist schools for their particular branch. The junior officers who came into the army by desertion from the Austrian army (largely during the first and second Italian wars of independence) were given the same rank they had had in the Austrian army, while older soldiers who deserted from the Austrians were promoted to junior officer class.

=== Officers ===
The law regulating the officers was approved on 25 May 1852 by Victor Emmanuel II. As for the junior officers, officers deserting from the Austrian army were given the same rank that they had previously held.

The promotion structure was as follows:

- Sub-lieutenants: 1/3 drawn from junior officers and 2/3 from the military academies.
- Lieutenants: In peacetime by seniority; in wartime 1/3 were free appointments.
- Captains: In peacetime 1/3 were by free choice; in wartime 1/2 were.
- Majors: In peacetime 1/2 were by free choice; in wartime all of them were.
- Lieutenant-Colonel and above: In peace and war, all were free appointments.

=== Insignia ===
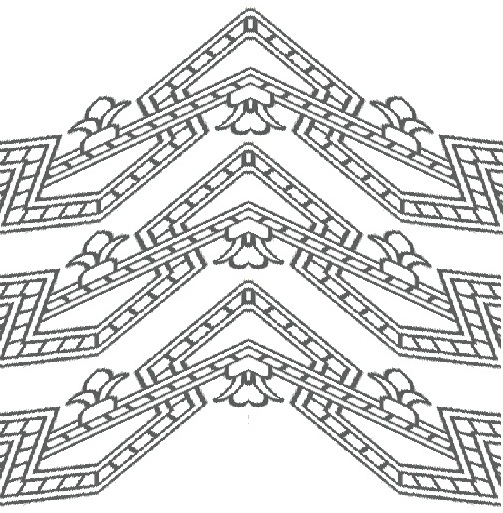
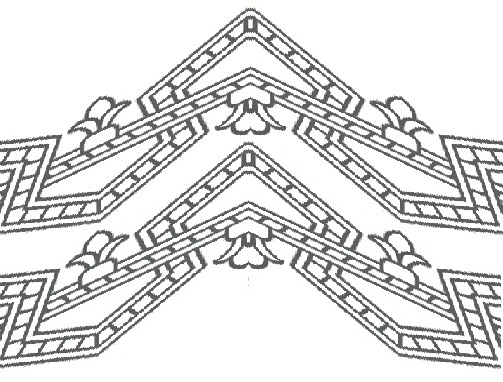
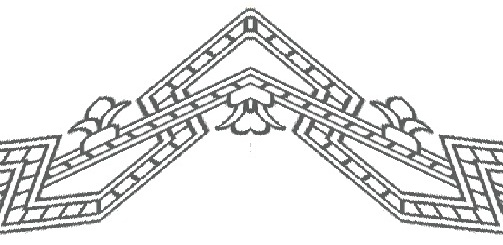
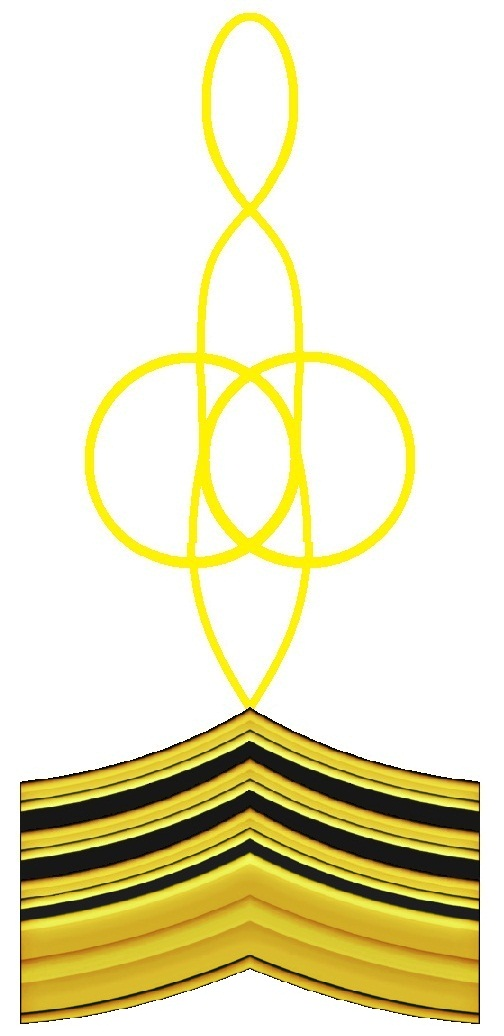
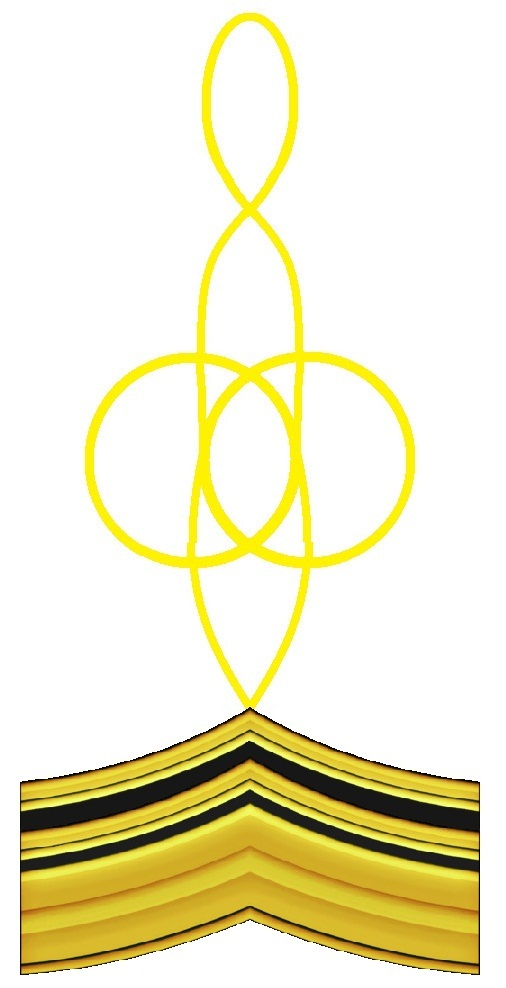
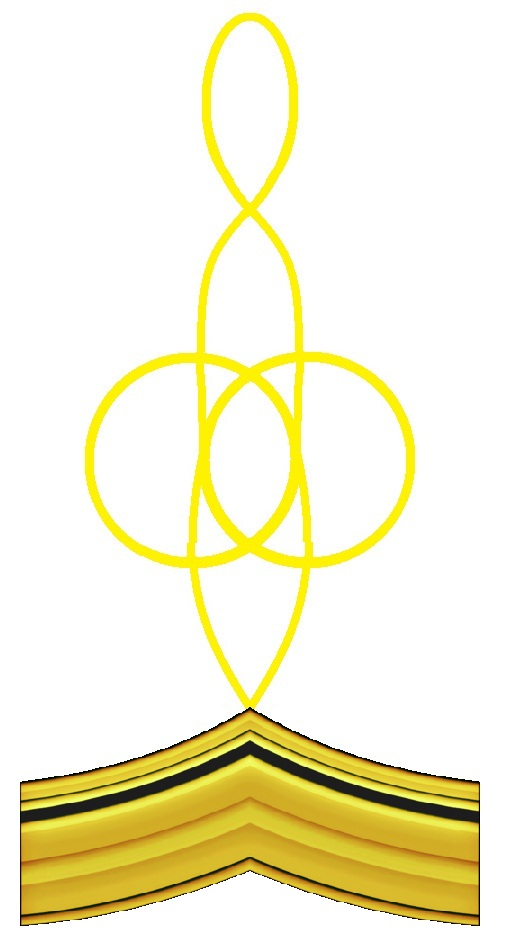
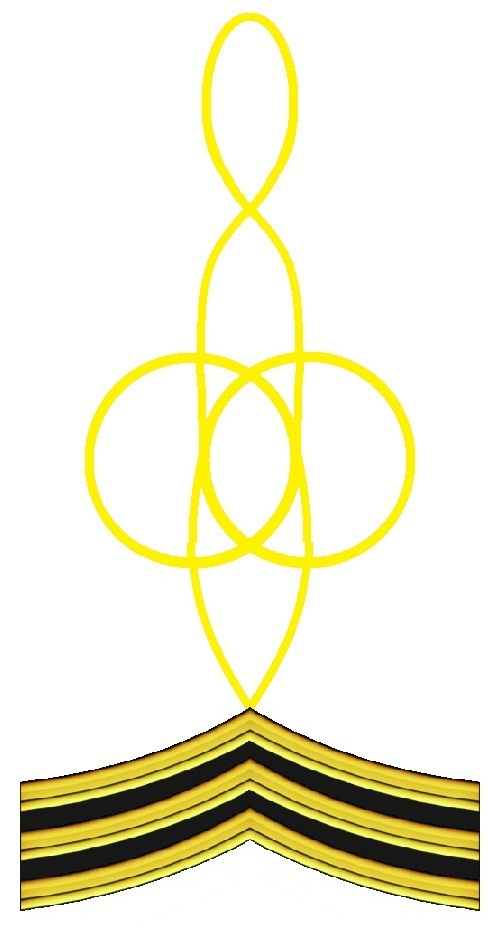
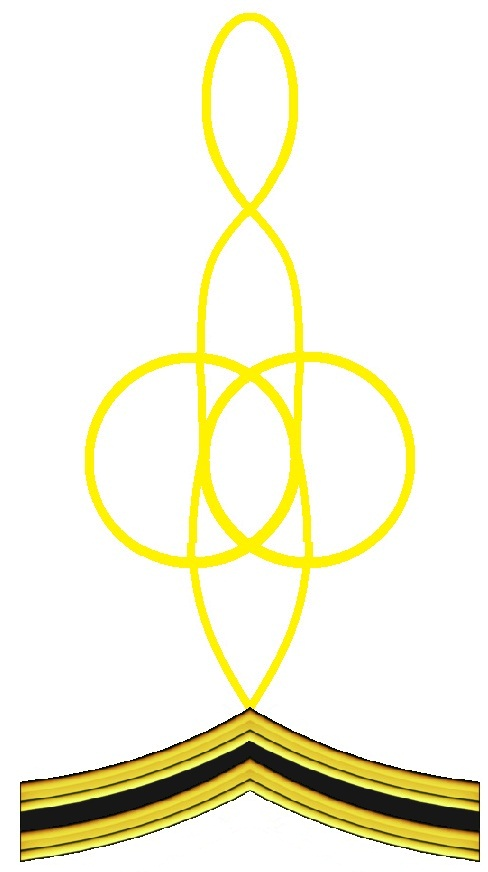
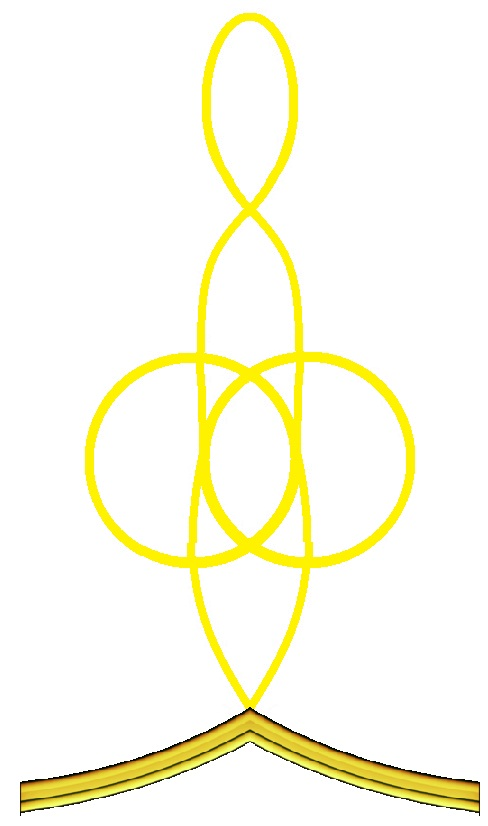
Sleeve insignia
Rank	Generale d'esercito	Tenente Generale	Maggiore Generale	Colonnello	Tenente colonnello	Maggiore	Capitano	Tenente	Sottotenente
English	Army general	Lieutenant general	Major general	Colonel	Lieutenant-colonel	Major	Captain	Lieutenant	Sub-lieutenant

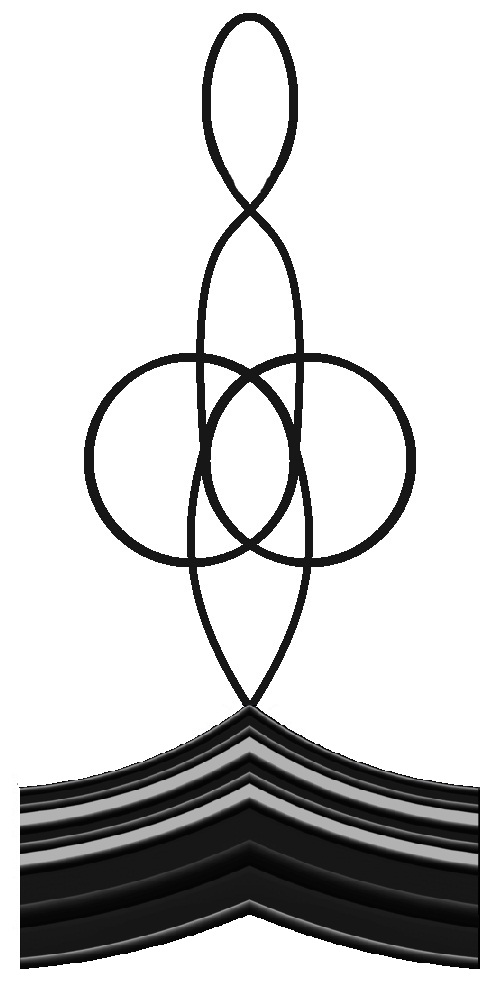
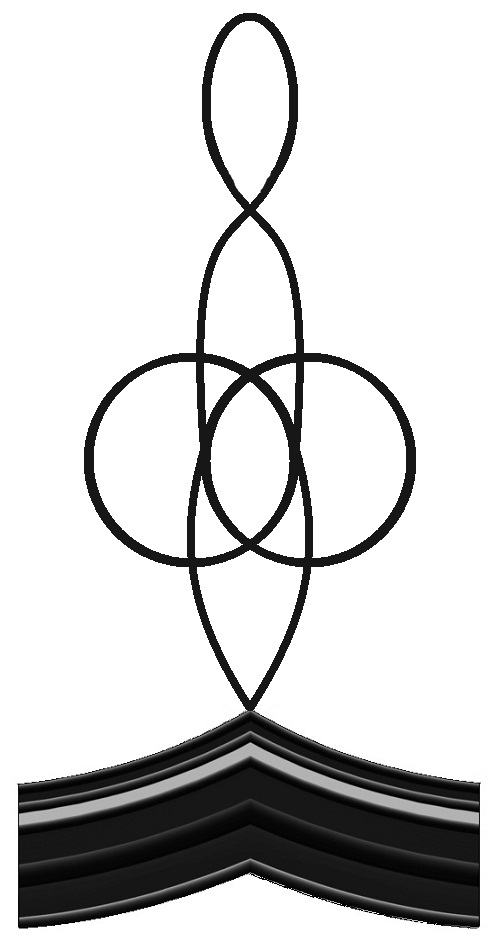
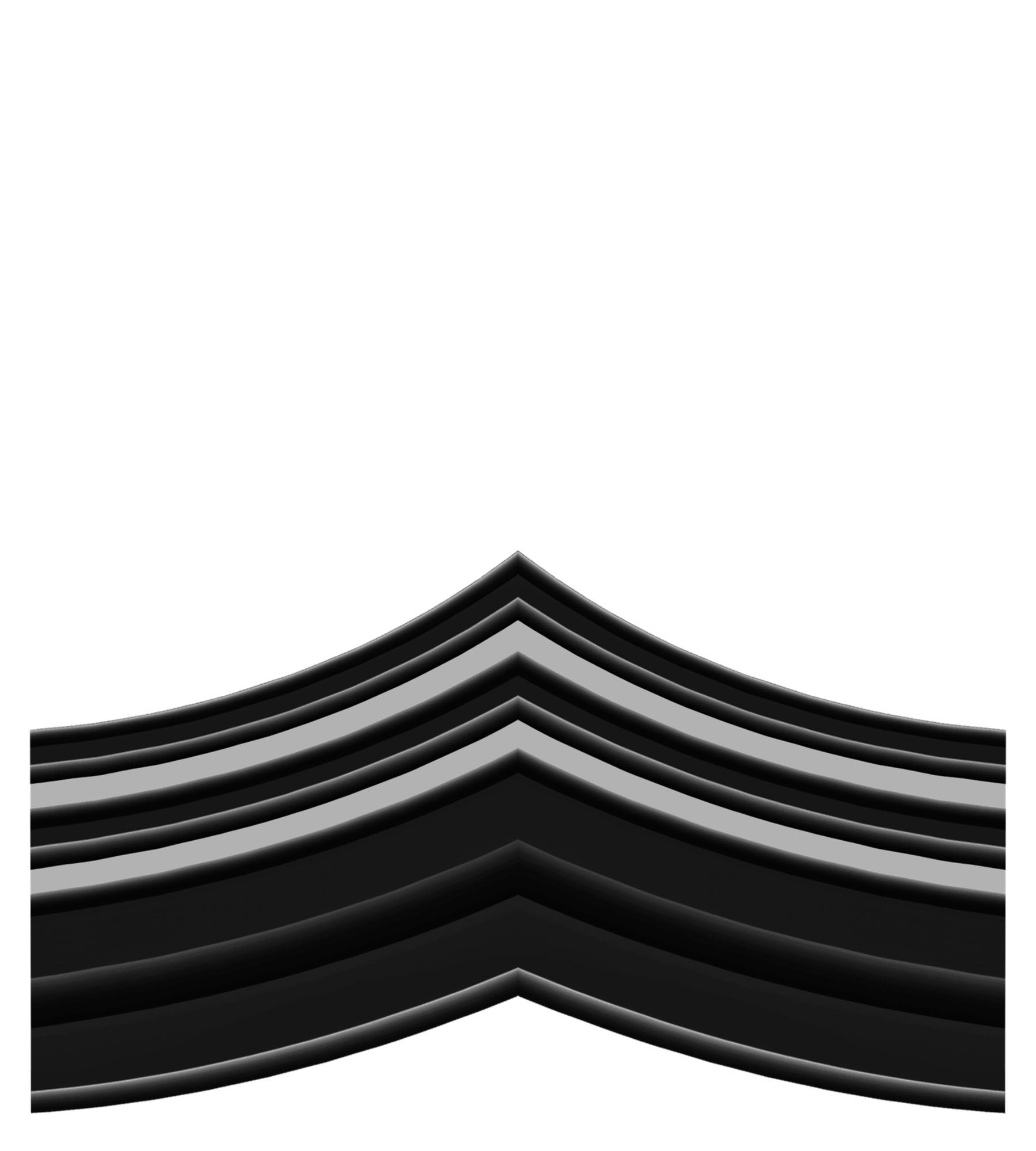
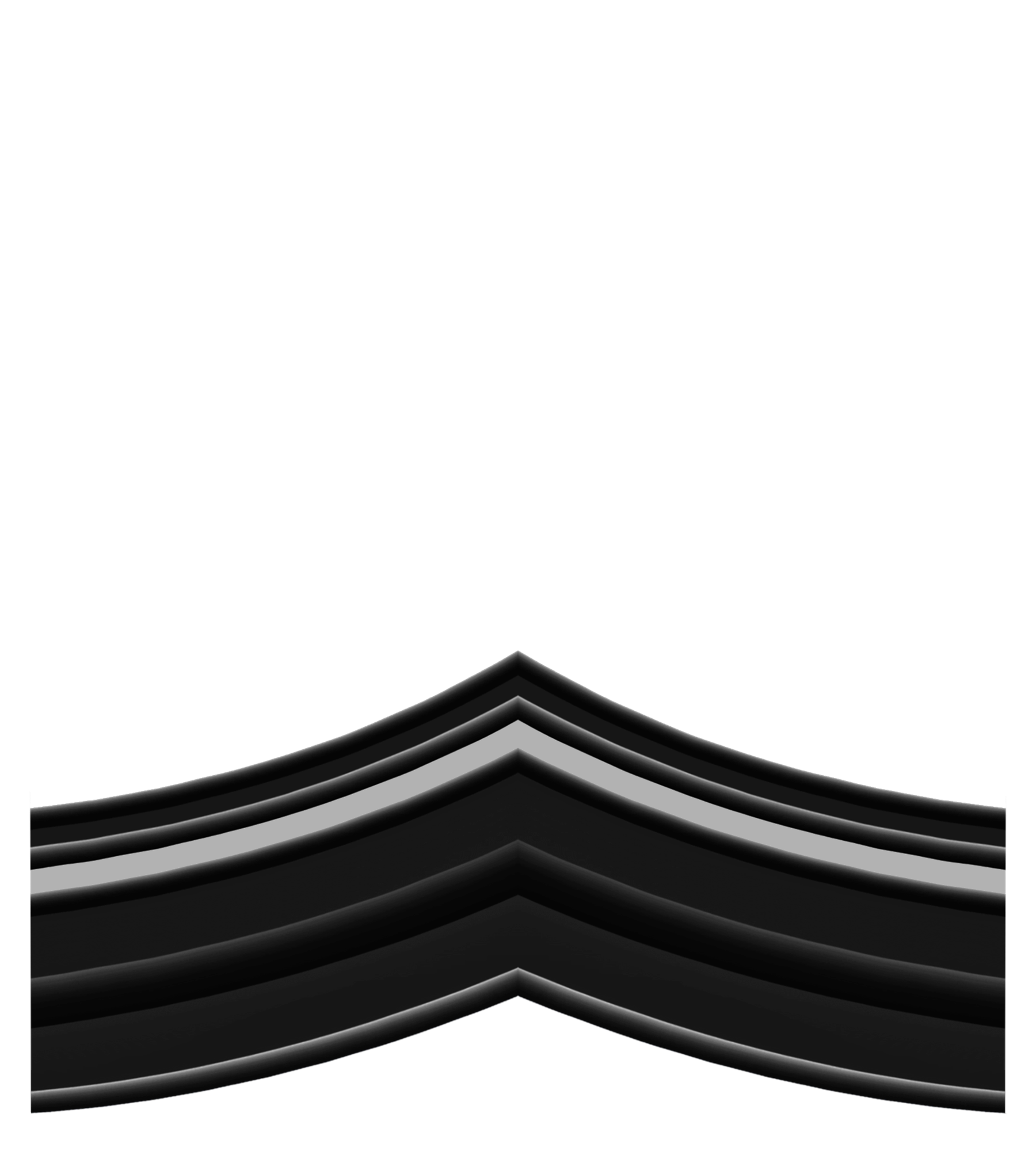
Sleeve insignia
Rank	Sergente maggiore	Sergente	Caporale maggiore	Caporale
English	Sergeant major	Sergeant	Corporal major	Corporal

== See also ==
- Kingdom of Sardinia
- Royal Sardinian Navy
- Uniforms of the Italian Armed Forces

== Bibliography ==
- Ambrogio Viviani, 4 giugno 1859 – Dalle ricerche la prima storia vera, Zeisciu Editore, 1997
- Ilari, Virgilio; Crociani, Piero; Ales, Stefano (2008). Il Regno di Sardegna nelle guerre napoleoniche e le legioni anglo-italiane 1799-1815 (in Italian). Invorio: Widerholdt Frères. ISBN 978-88-902817-7-8.
- Ilari, Virgilio; Shamà, Davide; Delmonte, Dario; Sconfienza, Roberto; Vialardi di Sandigliano, Tomaso (2008). Dizionario biografico dell'Armata sarda 1799-1815 (in Italian). Invorio: Widerholdt Frères. ISBN 978-8-89-028179-2.
