= Regiment "Piemonte Cavalleria" (2nd) =

Active Italian Army cavalry unit

- Reggimento "Piemonte Cavalleria" (2°)
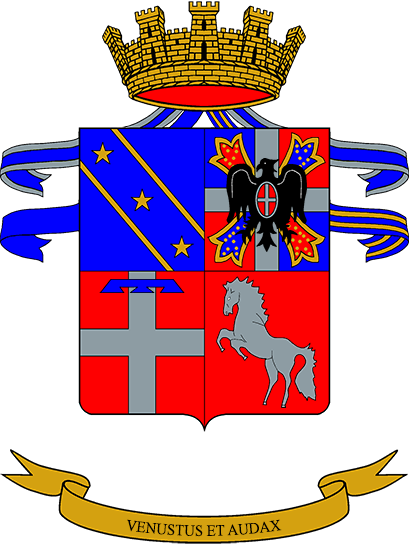
- Regimental coat of arms
- Active: 23 July 1692 — 10 May 1799; 1 Jan. 1815 — 8 Sept. 1943; 15 May 1949 — today
- Country: Italy
- Branch: Italian Army
- Part of: Alpine Brigade "Julia"
- Garrison/HQ: Villa Opicina
- Motto: "Venustus et Audax"
- Anniversaries: 21 March 1849 - Battle of Sforzesca
- Decorations: 2x Silver Medals of Military Valor; 1x Bronze Medal of Military Valor; 1x Bronze Medal of Army Valor

Insignia
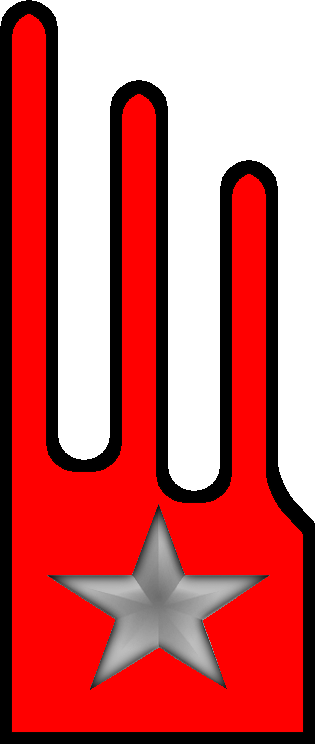
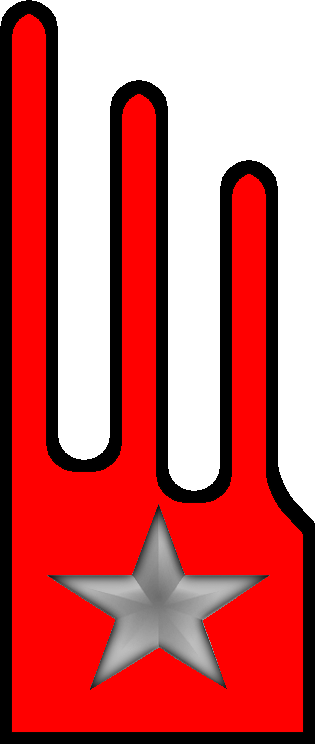
- Regimental gorget patches

The Regiment "Piemonte Cavalleria" (2nd) (Italian: Reggimento "Piemonte Cavalleria" (2°)) is a cavalry unit of the Italian Army based in Villa Opicina in Friuli-Venezia Giulia. The regiment is the reconnaissance unit of the Alpine Brigade "Julia".

In 1692, Victor Amadeus II, Duke of Savoy ordered to form two cavalry regiments for service in the Nine Years' War. One of the two new regiments was named Cavalry Regiment "Piemonte Reale" (Italian: Reggimento di Cavalleria "Piemonte Reale"). From 1701 to 1713, regiment fought in the War of the Spanish Succession. Between 1733 and 1735, the regiment fought in the War of the Polish Succession, and from 1741 to 1748 in the War of the Austrian Succession. From 1792 to 1796, the regiment fought in the War of the First Coalition against the French Republic. In November 1798, during the War of the Second Coalition, French forces occupied Piedmont, forced King Charles Emmanuel IV into exile, and formed the Piedmontese Republic, a French client-state. In spring 1799, the regiment fought on the French side against the Austrians, which disbanded the Piedmontese Republic and its military units after their victorious campaign in Italy.

In May 1814, King Victor Emmanuel I returned from exile in Sardinia and in July of the same year the King ordered to reform the regiment. In 1849, during the First Italian War of Independence, the regiment distinguished itself in the battles of Sforzesca and Novara, for which the regiment was awarded a Silver Medal of Military Valor. In 1859, the regiment participated in the Second Italian War of Independence. In 1860-1861, the regiment fought in the Sardinian campaign in central and southern Italy, during which it distinguished itself in the Battle of Garigliano, for which the regiment was awarded its second Silver Medal of Military Valor. In 1866, the regiment participated in the Third Italian War of Independence. During World War I the regiment fought on the Italian Front. In World War II the regiment participated in the invasion of Yugoslavia and served afterwards in Croatia on anti-partisan duty. In November 1942, the regiment participated in the occupation of Vichy France. After the announcement of the Armistice of Cassibile on 8 September 1943 the regiment was disbanded by invading German forces.

In November 1946, the Italian Army formed the 2nd Cavaliers Reconnaissance Group, which received the regiment's traditions and scarlet gorget patches. In 1949, the group was expanded to 2nd Armored Cavalry Regiment "Piemonte Cavalleria". In 1957, the regiment moved to Meran, where it joined the IV Army Corps. In 1957, the regiment was assigned to the Cavalry Brigade, which in 1959 was renamed Cavalry Brigade "Pozzuolo del Friuli". In 1975, the regiment was disbanded and its I Squadrons Group became an autonomous unit and was renamed 2nd Mechanized Squadrons Group "Piemonte Cavalleria". The squadrons group was assigned to the newly formed Armored Brigade "Vittorio Veneto" and received the traditions and standard of the Regiment "Piemonte Cavalleria" (2nd). In 1991, the squadrons group lost its autonomy and entered the 2nd Regiment "Piemonte Cavalleria", which was assigned to the Cavalry Brigade "Pozzuolo del Friuli". One year later, the regiment was renamed Regiment "Piemonte Cavalleria" (2nd). In 1993, the regiment was equipped with wheeled Centauro tank destroyers. In 2014, the regiment was transferred to the Alpine Brigade "Julia".

The regiment's anniversary falls on 21 March 1849, to commemorate the regiment's conduct during the Battle of Sforzesca, for which the regiment was awarded a Silver Medal of Military Valor. As one of the two Italian Army heavy cavalry regiments, whose history dates back to the 17th century, the regiment's enlisted personnel is addressed as "Cavalier" (Italian: Cavaliere).

== History ==
=== Formation ===
In June 1690, the Victor Amadeus II, Duke of Savoy joined Grand Alliance, which required Savoy to enter the Nine Years' War against the Kingdom of France. Initially the Savoyard Army fielded only two cavalry regiments (Regiment "Dragoni di Sua Altezza Reale", Regiment "Dragoni del Génévois"), to which a third was added on 4 July 1690 (Regiment "Dragoni di Piemonte"). On 23 July 1692, the existing Piedmont Squadron, which had been formed upon Savoy's entry into the war and consisted of two brigades of mounted Gens d'Arme, was split and formed two regiments: one in Turin, which was initially named for its commander Regiment Cavaglià, the other in Valdengo, which was initially named for one of its company commanders Regiment None, and then for its commander Regiment Montbrison. Later in the same year the Regiment Cavaglià was given the name Cavalry Regiment "Piemonte Reale" (Italian: Reggimento di Cavalleria "Piemonte Reale"), while the Regiment Montbrison was given the name Cavalry Regiment "Savoia" (Italian: Reggimento di Cavalleria "Savoia"). The Cavalry Regiment "Piemonte Reale" was named for the Principality of Piedmont, while the Cavalry Regiment "Savoia" was named for the Duchy of Savoy. Both regiments consisted of a staff of 36 officers and nine companies of 50 cavaliers per company.

On 4 October 1693, all five Savoyard cavalry regiments fought in the Battle of Marsaglia. On 5 December 1696, the regiment was reduced from nine to eight companies. On 29 August 1696, France and Savoy signed the Treaty of Turin, which ended the latter's involvement in the war, followed on 20 September 1697, by the Peace of Ryswick, which ended the Nine Years' War. Consequently, the number of cavaliers per company in the Savoyard Army's two cavalry regiments were reduced 50 to 35 cavaliers. On 22 November 1699, the Cavalry Regiment "Savoia" was disbanded and its personnel and horses transferred to the Cavalry Regiment "Piemonte Reale" and Regiment "Dragoni di Sua Altezza Reale".

=== Cabinet Wars ===
==== War of the Spanish Succession ====
In March 1701, Duke Victor Amadeus II joined the War of the Spanish Succession on the French side and, consequently on 7 May of the same year, the Cavalry Regiment "Savoia" was reformed. At the time the Savoyard Army's cavalry regiments fielded a staff and eight companies, which were grouped in four squadrons. Each company fielded 60 cavaliers, while the regiment's staff consisted of 30 officers. On 15 August 1702, the regiments "Dragoni di Sua Altezza Reale", "Dragoni del Génévois", "Piemonte Reale" and "Savoia" fought in the Battle of Luzzara. In 1703, Victor Amadeus II entered secret negotiations with the anti-French Second Grand Alliance and in October of that year declared war on France. On 24 December of the same year, the Cavalry Regiment "Piemonte Reale" added a fifth squadron of two companies and then fielded some 700 men.

By 1706, France had occupied most of the territories of Victor Amadeus II, leaving only his capital Turin in his possession. On 2 June 1706, a French army led by Louis de la Feuillade began to besiege Turin. Victor Amadeus II left the Austrian general Philipp von Daun in command of defences of Turin and escaped from the city on 17 June with 7,000 Austrian and Savoyard cavalry. Two days later the French closed the siege ring around the city. Meanwhile, further East, a French field army under Philippe II, Duke of Orléans maneuvered to prevent an Imperial army led by Austrian field marshal Prince Eugene of Savoy from coming to the relief of Turin. Attempting to buy time for Prince Eugene, Victor Amadeus II spent the next two months attacking French supply lines with his cavalry. On 15 August, Prince Eugene began his advance on Turin, easily evading Orléans' covering force. On 29 August, he reached Carmagnola south of Turin, where he was joined by Victor Amadeus II. Aware of Prince Eugene's approach, Orléans joined La Feuillade, and their combined force made three assaults on Turin between 27 August and 3 September. On 5 September, the Savoyard-Imperial army concentrated at Collegno, between the Dora Riparia and the Stura di Lanzo rivers near a weak spot in the French lines. On 7 September, Prince Eugene divided his force into eight columns and ordered an all out attack on the French forces. Victor Amadeus II personally led his cavalry regiments into the fray, charged the Duke of Orléans and his entourage, which led to the Duke of Orléans being wounded and forced to retreated from the battlefield. Afterwards Victor Amadeus II led the regiments "Dragoni di Sua Altezza Reale" and "Dragoni del Génévois" to the bridges over the Po river to block the French's route of escape.

In 1707, the regiment fought in the Sayorard campaign to free the County of Nice from French occupation and the following Siege of Toulon. In August 1708, the regiment fought in the Siege of Fenestrelle and the campaign to liberate the Duchy of Savoy. On 12 September 1712, the regiments "Piemonte Reale" and "Savoia" defeated a French column at Villanovetta and forced the French to retreat back through the Val Varaita into France. On 14 March 1713, France and Savoy signed a truce, while the other belligerents signed the first of the treaties of the Peace of Utrecht, which transferred the Kingdom of Sicily and parts of the Duchy of Milan to Savoy and confirmed the 1708 transfer of the Duchy of Montferrat to the House of Savoy. On 27 March of the same year, the Cavalry Regiment "Piemonte Reale" was reduced to eight companies, which were grouped into two squadrons.

==== War of the Polish Succession ====
On 3 September 1730, Victor Amadeus II abdicated the throne and his son ascended the throne as King Charles Emmanuel III of Sardinia, who had been the commanding officer of the Regiment "Dragoni di Piemonte" from 1722 to 1729. On 1 February 1733, King Augustus II of Poland died and King Louis XV of France supported his father-in-laws Stanisław Leszczyński's claim to the throne, which was opposed by Austria, Prussia, Saxony and Russia. Throughout summer of 1733, the French prepared for the war and after secret negotiations with Charles Emmanuel III the Treaty of Turin was signed, which allowed the French to move their armies through Sardinian territory and promised the Duchy of Milan to Charles Emmanuel III. On 10 October 1733, the War of the Polish Succession began and Charles Emmanuel III immediately invaded the Duchy of Milan with 50,000 French-Spanish and Sardinian troops and on 3 November Milan, albeit not the city's fortress, surrendered to Charles Emmanuel III. In December 1733, the five Sardinian cavalry regiments were increased from eight to ten companies of 50 men per company.

On 29 June 1734, the French-Sardinian armies, which included the regiments "Dragoni di Piemonte", "Piemonte Reale" and "Savoia", clashed with Austrian forces in the Battle of San Pietro near Parma. On 19 September 1734, Charles Emmanuel III was personally present when the French-Sardinian army, including all five Sardinian cavalry regiments, defeated the Austrians in the Battle of Guastalla. In October 1735, the war ended with a preliminary peace agreement, which was ratified in the Treaty of Vienna in November 1738. Although Charles Emmanuel III did not receive the Duchy of Milan, he was compensated with the Milanese territories West of the Ticino river, including Novara and Tortona.

On 23 November 1736, the Royal Sardinian Army formed a sixth cavalry regiment with men and horses drawn from the existing five cavalry regiments. The core of the new regiment consisted of a Hussars company, which had been formed on 20 July 1734 with Hungarian exiles, who wished to fight against Austria. The new regiment, which consisted, like all other Sardinian cavalry regiments, of ten companies was given the name Regiment "Dragoni della Regina" (Regiment "Dragoons of the Queen").

In 1737, each dragoon and cavalry company was issued five rifled carabines, which had greater accuracy than the standard firearms provided to the Sardinian cavalry. In the four dragoon regiments, the men equipped with these carabiners were given the name "Granatieri" (Grenadiers), while in the two cavalry regiments they were given the name "Carabinieri" (Carabiniers). If needed, each regiment could unite these men in a company of 50 men.

==== War of the Austrian Succession ====
On 20 October 1740, Emperor Charles VI died, which led to the First Silesian War, which in turn triggered the War of the Austrian Succession. In 1741, an army of 40,000 Spaniards and Neapolitans marched North from central Italy with the aim to conquering the Duchy of Milan. The aggressiveness of the Spanish in Italy led to Empress Maria Theresa of Austria and Charles Emmanuel III to sign, on 1 February 1742, the Convention of Turin, which formed an alliance between the two countries. Immediately afterwards, Sardinian forces, including 18 cavalry squadrons of 110 men each, were sent to occupy the Duchy of Modena, whose ruler, Francesco III d'Este, Duke of Modena had allied himself with the Spanish. In May 1742, all six Sardinian cavalry regiments clashed with Spanish forces in the Emilia region in northern Italy. Meanwhile, another Spanish Army had crossed France and occupied the Duchy of Savoy. In September 1742, Charles Emmanuel III led the majority of his army, including the regiments "Dragoni di Sua Maestà" and "Dragoni di Piemonte", over the Little St Bernard Pass and by 15 October the entire Duchy of Savoy had been liberated. However, in early December, the Spanish were reinforced and invaded Savoy again, which forced Charles Emmanuel III to retreat to Piedmont. In the meantime in northern Italy the Spanish Army had crossed into the Duchy of Modena, where, on 8 February 1743, the Austrian-Sardinian and Spanish armies clashed in the Battle of Campo Santo. At Campo Santo the regiments "Savoia" and "Dragoni della Regina" fought bravely and suffered heavy casualties, including the latter regiment's commanding officer Colonel Filippo Perucard Ballone.

On 13 September 1743, Charles Emmanuel III, Maria Theresa and Britain signed the Treaty of Worms, intended to expel Spain from Italy. In return for Sardinia's support, the Austrians ceded all their territories west of the river Ticino and Lake Maggiore, along with their lands South of the Po river, to Charles Emmanuel III. In return, Charles Emmanuel III renounced his claim to the Duchy of Milan, guaranteed the Pragmatic Sanction, and provided 40,000 troops, paid for by Britain. The following month, French forces invaded Piedmont through the Val Varaita and at Casteldelfino a Sardinian blocking force, which included the grenadier companies of the regiments "Dragoni di Sua Maestà", "Dragoni del Génévois", "Dragoni di Piemonte" and "Dragoni della Regina", stopped the invasion in the First Battle of Casteldelfino. In 1744, France and Spain planned to jointly invade Piedmont and the cavalry's grenadiers and carabiniers, as well as dismounted dragoons, were deployed along with infantry units to defend the mountain passes across the Alps. On 19 July 1744, the French-Spanish army won the Second Battle of Casteldelfino, which opened the way through the Val Varaita into Piedmont. Once clear of the mountains the French-Spanish Army turned South and besieged Cuneo. On 30 September 1744, Charles Emmanuel III attempted to lift the siege of Cuneo in the Battle of Madonna dell'Olmo, during which the Regiment "Dragoni di Piemonte" was called forth to stabilize the Sardinian front in a critical moment and did so at the cost of more than 50 of its men.

On 26 June 1745, the Republic of Genoa declared war on Sardinia and allowed a French-Spanish Army to cross into Piedmont through its territory. On 27 September 1745, a French-Spanish-Genovan army defeated Charles Emmanuel III in the Battle of Bassignano. To cover the retreat of the six Sardinian cavalry regiments, the regiments' grenadiers and carabiniers were sent to cover the retreat with precise rifle fire. Initially the grenadiers and carabiniers held the enemy cavalry at bay, until a French brigade of dragoons overcame them and charged the last of the retreating Sardinian cavalry regiments, the Regiment "Dragoni di Piemonte", which lost 9 officers and 160 dragons in the ensuing fight.

The following year, on 16 June 1746, the Austrians defeated the French and Spanish in the Battle of Piacenza. By August of the same year, the Sardinian Army was encamped at Borghetto Lodigiano, while the Austrian Army was at Piacenza. On 8 August 1746, the regiments "Dragoni di Sua Maestà", "Dragoni di Piemonte", and "Savoia" detached each a squadron of two cavalry companies, which were sent to Piacenza to support the Austrians. On 10 August, the Austrians and French-Spanish forces clashed in the Battle of Rottofreddo along the Tidone river. Over the course of the day, the three Sardinian squadrons charged they enemy seven times and captured five enemy flags and standards. In 1746, the Cavalry Regiment "Piemonte Reale" fought in the Siege of Valenza.

Negotiations between Britain and France had been taking place at Breda since June 1746; the terms they agreed were then imposed on the other parties at Aachen, where between 18 October 1748 and 21 January 1749 all parties signed the Treaty of Aix-la-Chapelle, which ended the war.

=== Victor Amadeus III's reforms ===
On 20 February 1773, King Charles Emmanuel III died and was succeeded by his son Victor Amadeus III, who set out to reform the Royal Sardinian Army. The army's cavalry regiments were assigned to the newly formed Department of the Cavalry, which consisted of a Wing of Dragoons and a Wing of Cavalry. Both wings consisted of two brigades of two regiments. On 28 August 1774, Victor Amadeus III ordered to complete the reform by forming two new cavalry regiments. On 16 September 1774, the regiments "Dragoni di Sua Maestà", "Dragoni di Piemonte" and "Dragoni della Regina" ceded each two companies to help form the Regiment "Dragoni del Chiablese", while the regiments "Dragoni del Génévois", "Piemonte Reale" and "Savoia" ceded each two companies to help form the Cavalry Regiment "Aosta". At the same time the Regiment "Dragoni del Génévois" was renamed Regiment "Cavalleggeri di Sua Maestà" (Regiment "Chevau-légers of His Majesty"). Each regiment consisted of a staff and eight companies grouped in four squadrons. After the reform the Sardinian Cavalry, which excluded the Dragoons of Sardinia stationed in Sardinia, consisted of the following units:

Department of the Cavalry
| Wing of Dragoons | | Wing of Cavalry | |
| Brigade "Dragoni di Sua Maestà" | Brigade "Dragoni di Piemonte" | Brigade "Cavalleggeri di Sua Maestà" | Brigade "Piemonte Reale" |
| Regiment "Dragoni di Sua Maestà" | Regiment "Dragoni di Piemonte" | Regiment "Cavalleggeri di Sua Maestà" | Cavalry Regiment "Piemonte Reale" |
| Regiment "Dragoni della Regina" | Regiment "Dragoni del Chiablese" | Cavalry Regiment "Savoia" | Cavalry Regiment "Aosta" |

Victor Amadeus III also ordered to issue the cavalry regiments identical standards: cavalry regiments were issued a square standard, while dragoon regiments were issued a square standard with a dual swallowtail. The newly formed chevau-léger regiment was issued a square standard with a single central triangle protruding from the square. All cavalry regiment's were issued the same azure uniform, albeit with different colored cuffs, collars, buttons, and lining, whose color combination was unique and reflected in the colors of the regiment's standard. Furthermore, Victor Amadeus III regulated the training of new recruits, introduced the rank of Sergeant, and codified the cavalry's regimental music.

=== French Revolutionary Wars ===
==== War of the First Coalition ====
On 21 September 1792, French forces invaded the Duchy of Savoy and on 29 September the County of Nice. These unprovoked French attacks led to King Victor Amadeus III joining the War of the First Coalition against the French Republic. At the time the Sardinian cavalry fielded some 4,000 troops in eight regiments, each of which consisted of four squadrons of two companies. Additionally in Sardinia the Corps of Light Dragoons of Sardinia consisted of two squadrons of two companies. In Savoy the Regiment "Cavalleggeri di Sua Maestà" and two squadrons of the Regiment "Dragoni della Regina" resisted with infantry units the French invasion, but soon had to retreat over the Little Saint Bernard Pass to Aosta. In Nice two squadrons of the Regiment "Dragoni di Sua Maestà", two squadrons of the Regiment "Dragoni di Piemonte" and one squadron of the Cavalry Regiment "Aosta" fought against the French invaders, albeit also in this case the outnumbered Sardinian troops had to retreat into Piedmont. In June of the following year, an attempt by the French Army of Italy to invade Piedmont was defeated by Austrian-Sardinian forces in the First Battle of Saorgio. An attempt by Sardinia to liberate Savoy from French occupation was defeated in September of the same year in the Battle of Epierre.

During the winter of 1792-93, the French attempts to land in Sardinia were defeated by local troops and the Light Dragoons of Sardinia. On 21 May 1793, King Victor Amadeus III established a new reward for non-commissioned officers and soldiers of the Royal Sardinian Army and Royal Sardinian Navy, who had performed exceptional acts of valor. The Gold Medal of Military Valor and Silver Medal of Military Valor were to be awarded by a regiment's commanding officer in front of the entire regiment assembled in arms. On 7-8 September 1793, a Sardinian attempt to drive the French out of Nice failed, but during the attack and following retreat the regiments "Dragoni di Sua Maestà" and "Dragoni della Regina" distinguished themselves. On 1 October of the same year, in the Tarentaise Valley French forces clashed with troops of the Regiment "Dragoni del Chiablese", during which Sergeant Girolamo Musso distinguished himself. For the valor shown Musso was awarded, as first among the members of the cavalry, a Silver Medal of Military Valor.

In April 1794, the Army of Italy went on the offensive and defeated the Austrian-Sardinian forces in the Second Battle of Saorgio. On 21 September of the same year the Army of Italy won the First Battle of Dego, but the French did not follow their victory with an invasion of Piedmont and instead occupied part the Western part of the Republic of Genoa. On 3 February 1795, the two squadrons of the Light Dragoons of Sardinia were transferred to Piedmont. In summer of 1795, a joint Austrian-Sardinian Army defeated the Army of Italy in the Battle of Monte Settepani, but in turn the Army of Italy defeated the allies in the Battle of Loano on 23–24 November of the same year.

==== Montenotte campaign ====
On 27 March 1796, Napoleon Bonaparte arrived in Italy and took command of the Army of Italy. On 10 April, Austrian forces defeated a French brigade in the Battle of Voltri near Genoa. Two days later, on 12 April, Napoleon counterattacked and defeated an Austrian-Sardinian Army in the Battle of Montenotte. Over the next two days, 13 and 14 April, the two sides clashed in smaller battles in Liguria, which Napoleon, as the victor, named the Battle of Millesimo. On 14-15 April, Napoleon defeated the Austrians and Sardinians in the Second Battle of Dego, followed by a French victory over Sardinian forces the next day, 16 April, in the Battle of Ceva. As the Austrians now retreated towards Lombardy, Napoleon turned his attention to the Sardinians and drove the Sardinian army relentlessly westward toward the fortress of Cuneo and the plains of Piedmont.

On 18 April, the Sardinians retreated into a strong position behind the Corsaglia river to the east of Mondovì. On 20 April, the two sides clashed in the Battle of Mondovì with the fiercest fighting occurring in and around the town of San Michele Mondovì. During the night of 20-21 April, the Sardinians retreated further behind the Ellero river. However, the rapid French pursuit caught up with the Sardinian rearguard in the village of Vicoforte. The Sardinian forces then began a hasty retreat, during which the I and III squadrons of the Regiment "Dragoni di Sua Maestà" charged and dispersed the French 5^{e} Régiment de dragons and captured the commander of the French 1st Cavalry Division General Henri Christian Michel de Stengel. The defeat at Mondovì and the retreat of the Austrian army towards northeastern Italy, left King Victor Amadeus III no other option but to sign on 28 April the Armistice of Cherasco. On 5 May 1796, the Regiment "Dragoni di Sua Maestà" was awarded two Gold Medal of Military Valor by order of King Victor Amadeus III, who declared that "one [Gold Medal] is not enough to reward so much valor". The King also commanded that the two medals were affixed to the regiment's standard, which began the Italian military's tradition to affix all awards to its units flags and standards.

On 15 May 1796, Sardinia signed Treaty of Paris, which forced Sardinia out of the First Coalition. The treaty also codified the transfer of the Duchy of Savoy and the County of Nice to France, gave the French Revolutionary Army free passage through the Kingdom of Sardinia, and imposed a limit of 10,000 troops on the Royal Sardinian Army. On 16 October of the same year, King Victor Amadeus III died and his eldest son Charles Emmanuel IV ascended the throne. Ten days later, on 26 October 1796, the new king ordered to reform and reduce the size of the Royal Sardinian Army and, on the same day, the army's two youngest cavalry regiments: "Dragoni del Chiablese" and "Aosta" were disbanded and their squadrons distributed among the remaining regiments. Similarly, the two squadrons of Light Dragoons of Sardinia were also disbanded and their companies assigned to other regiments. Thus the Cavalry Regiment "Piemonte Reale" incorporated the I Squadron and II Squadron of the Cavalry Regiment "Aosta". As part of the reform the company level was abolished and after the reform each of the remaining six cavalry regiments consisted of four squadrons.

==== War of the Second Coalition ====
On 29 November 1798, the War of the Second Coalition began and French forces invaded Piedmont. Already on 6 December 1798, the French occupied Turin and took King Charles Emmanuel IV prisoner. On 8 December 1798, the King was forced to sign a document of abdication, which also ordered his former subjects to recognise French laws and his troops to obey the orders of the French Revolutionary Army. Afterwards, King Charles Emmanuel IV was released and went into exile on the island of Sardinia, while his former territories became the French controlled Piedmontese Republic. On 9 December 1798, the Sardinian troops were released from their oath of allegiance to the King and sworn to the Piedmontese Republic. Soon afterwards, the Cavalry Regiment "Piemonte Reale" was renamed 4th Cavalry Regiment and sent to Monza.

In January 1799, the regiment was renamed 4th Piedmontese Dragoons Regiment (Italian: 4° Reggimento Dragoni Piemontesi), while the 5th Cavalry Regiment (former Regiment "Dragoni della Regina") and 6th Cavalry Regiment (former Cavalry Regiment "Savoia") were disbanded. At the time, the 4th Piedmontese Dragoons Regiment received two squadrons from the disbanded 6th Cavalry Regiment. In spring of 1799, the regiment fought with the French Army of Italy against the Austrian and Russian armies. On 26 March 1799, the regiment fought in the Battle of Verona, on 5 April, in the Battle of Magnano, and, on 28 April, in the Battle of Verderio. The Austrians won the latter battles and drove the French out of Italy. With the French retreat the Piedmontese Republic dissolved and the 4th Piedmontese Dragoons Regiment, like all regiments of the Piedmontese Republic, was disbanded on 10 May 1799 by the victorious Austrians.

In May 1800, Napoleon returned to Italy with a 60,000-man Army and in the following weeks defeated the Austrians in the Marengo campaign. On 14 June 1800, Napoleon won the Battle of Marengo and the next day the Austrian General Michael von Melas signed the Convention of Alessandria, which obliged the Austrians to retreat behind the Po and Mincio rivers. The French then created the Subalpine Republic to rule over the former territories of the kings of Sardinia. The new government in Turin then formed a dragoon regiment and a hussar regiment with personnel drawn from the disbanded Sardinian cavalry regiments. On 26 August 1801, Napoleon decreed that the military units of the Subalpine Republic were to be integrated the French Revolutionary Army. Thus the dragoon regiment became the 21^{e} Régiment de dragons, while the hussar regiment became the 26^{e} Régiment de chasseurs à cheval. Both regiments served in the campaigns of the Napoleonic Wars until May 1814, when they were disbanded after the Napoleon's abdication.

=== Restoration ===
On 4 June 1802, the exiled King Charles Emmanuel IV abdicated and the throne of the Kingdom of Sardinia passed to his younger brother Victor Emmanuel I. Due to French annexation of Piedmont Victor Emmanuel I only ruled the island of Sardinia for the next twelve years. On 6 April 1814, Napoleon abdicated and on 11 April the winners of the War of the Sixth Coalition exiled him to the island of Elba. On 20 May 1814, King Victor Emmanuel I returned from exile in Sardinia to Turin. Four days later, on 24 May 1814, the King ordered to begin the process of rebuilding the Royal Sardinian Army and the first four cavalry regiments ordered to reform were the Regiment "Dragoni di Sua Maestà", which was renamed Regiment "Dragoni del Re", Regiment "Dragoni della Regina", Regiment "Dragoni di Piemonte", and Regiment "Cavalleggeri di Sua Maestà", which was renamed Regiment "Cavalleggeri del Re".

The process of reforming the cavalry regiments proved to be difficult as Victor Emmanuel I forbade to take officers and soldiers into service, who had served in Napoleon's French Imperial Army, and for a lack of horses. In July 1814, the Victor Emmanuel I ordered to reform the Cavalry Regiment "Piemonte Reale", which was renamed Regiment "Piemonte Reale Cavalleria". In August 1814, the Sardinian government bought 1,400 light cavalry horses from Austria, which were taken from the Imperial Austrian Army's cavalry regiments leaving Italy. The first 600 horses were delivered immediately and the remainder in December. Due to the lack of heavy cavalry horses the Regiment "Dragoni di Piemonte" was now destined to become a Chevau-léger regiment and renamed Regiment "Cavalleggeri di Piemonte". On 1 December 1814, Victor Emmanuel I ordered to reform the Cavalry Regiment "Savoia", which was renamed Regiment "Savoia Cavalleria". Due to a lack of qualified volunteers, Victor Emmanuel I relented and also allowed officers and soldiers, who had served in the regiments of Napoleon's French Imperial Army, to join the reformed cavalry regiments.

On 1 January 1815, all six cavalry regiments were reformed and the Sardinian cavalry then consisted of the dragoon regiments "Dragoni del Re" and "Dragoni della Regina", which were formed in Turin, the Chevau-léger regiments "Cavalleggeri del Re" and "Cavalleggeri di Piemonte", which were formed in Carignano, and the heavy cavalry regiments "Piemonte Reale Cavalleria" and "Savoia Cavalleria", which were formed in Venaria Reale. Besides the six regiments based in Piedmont the cavalry also included the Regiment "Cavalleggeri di Sardegna" in Sardinia, which had been out of Napoleon's reach and thus never been disbanded. Each regiment consisted of a staff and six squadrons, which were grouped into three divisions. The divisions were commanded by and named for the three highest-ranking officers of a regiment: the first division was commanded by and named for the regiment's Colonel, the second division for the regiment's Lieutenant Colonel, and the third division for the regiment's Major. The squadrons, which were numerated 1st to 6th, were commanded by a captain and consisted of 100 men, grouped into two half ranks of 50 men, which in turn were commanded by a Subaltern. In total each regiment fielded 635 men and 548 horses.

In September 1814, the Congress of Vienna began, at which the European powers decided the new layout of the European political and constitutional order after the downfall of the Napoleon. The Congress confirmed the return of the Duchy of Savoy and the County of Nice to Sardinia, and by October had decided that the Republic of Genoa would not be reestablished and its territory given to the Kingdom of Sardinia. On 7 January 1815, the British forces in Genoa handed control of the city to the Piedmontese General Ignazio Thaon di Revel and the former Republic was incorporated into the Kingdom of Sardinia as Duchy of Genoa.

On 26 February 1815, Napoleon escaped from Elba and landed on 1 March 1815 in Golfe-Juan in France. This triggered the War of the Seventh Coalition, in which the Kingdom of Sardinia fought against France. The Royal Sardinian Army quickly formed a corps, which included the regiments "Cavalleggeri del Re" and "Cavalleggeri di Piemonte", that moved to secure Savoy. The corps then advanced to Grenoble, which was attacked on 6 July. On 9 July the city surrendered and the Sardinian forces moved to occupy Lyon, which surrendered to an Austrian-Sardinian force on 11 July. On 15 July 1815, Napoleon surrendered to Captain Frederick Maitland of the Royal Navy and was taken as prisoner to England. After the war the Sardinian forces occupied the Dauphiné region between the Duchy of Savoy and the County of Nice. On 20 November 1815, the Treaty of Paris was signed, which ended the Napoleonic wars and the Regiment "Cavalleggeri di Piemonte" left the Dauphiné and moved to Chambery in the Duchy of Savoy.

On 2 June 1819, the Regiment "Cavalleggeri di Sardegna" was merged with the Corps of Musketeers of Sardinia and thus the Sardinian cavalry was reduced to six regiments. On 23 June of the same year, the Regiment "Savoia Cavalleria", due to continuing lack of heavy horses, was reorganized as a Chevau-léger regiment and renamed Regiment "Cavalleggeri di Savoia". The same year, the three Chevau-léger regiments were issued a shako, while the following year the dragoon regiments and cavalry regiment were issued a metal Dragoon helmet. At the time the dragoons were armed with a flintlock musket, two flintlock pistols, and a sabre, while the cavaliers of the Regiment "Piemonte Reale Cavalleria" were armed with a flintlock musket, two flintlock pistols, and a straight cavalry sword. The Chevau-légers were armed with a flintlock musket or carabine with a shorter barrel, two flintlock pistols, and a sabre.

=== Revolt of 1821 ===
In January 1820, mutinous troops compelled King Ferdinand VII of Spain to accept a liberal constitution. The Spanish example spread to Sicily, where on 15 June 1820 rebels seized the local arsenal. On 1 July 1820, troops and Carbonari rose up in Naples and King Ferdinand I of the Two Sicilies was forced to grant a constitution on 6 July. In November of the same year the revolutionary parliament of Naples used the Army of the Two Sicilies to suppress the revolt in Sicily. In January 1821, Ferdinand I left Naples to participate in the Congress of Laibach, which authorized an Austrian intervention to quell the liberal uprising in Naples. The following month 50,000 Austrian troops invaded Naples.

Meanwhile, in the Kingdom of Sardinia, King Victor Emmanuel I had abolished after his return from exile the freedoms granted by the Napoleonic Code and established an oppressive absolutist rule. The widespread resentment to this kind of rule, the wish for a constitution and a desire by a part of the Royal Sardinian Army's officers corps to declare war on Austria to aid the revolutionaries in Naples resulted in a conspiracy led by Annibale Santorre, Count of Santarosa to overthrow the Sardinian government and declare war on Austria. In the night of 6 to 7 March, Santorre and three fellow conspirators met with Prince Charles Albert, Prince of Carignano, a cousin of King Victor Emmanuel I and the second in line to the throne Sardinia, who did not dissuade them from their intentions. The next day, on 7 March 1821, the Austrian forces defeated the Neapolitan rebels in the Battle of Rieti, but nonetheless during the night from 9 to 10 March the Sardinian conspirators began their coup. In Alessandria the troops of the Regiment "Dragoni del Re" arrested their officers and, together with the troops of the Brigade of "Genova", took control of the city's citadel. However, in Turin the rebels were forced by loyal troops, which included the Regiment "Piemonte Reale Cavalleria", to abandon the city and move to Alessandria. In Pinerolo 300 troops of the Regiment "Cavalleggeri del Re" joined the rebellion and left for Alessandria. The Regiment "Dragoni della Regina" in Vercelli however ignored the pleas of its deputy commander to join the rebellion and followed the regiment's commander to Novara. Likewise, a small number of the dragons of the Regiment "Dragoni del Re", who did not wish to join the rebellion, left Alessandria and joined the loyal forces in Turin. However, the biggest setback for the rebellion was the arrest of the Colonel Carlo Morozzo, Count of San Michele, commander of the Regiment "Cavalleggeri di Piemonte", who had been tasked with bringing his regiment from Fossano to Moncalieri to arrest King Victor Emmanuel I.

On 12 March, troops of the Brigade of "Monferrato" rebelled and took over the citadel in Turin. King Victor Emmanuel I sent Charles Albert to treat with the troops, who refused to compromise on their demands. On his return to the Royal Palace of Turin, Charles Albert was followed by an immense crowd, which was dispersed by the Regiment "Piemonte Reale Cavalleria" before the palace's gates. Later on the same day, King Victor Emmanuel I, unwilling to grant a liberal constitution or call for a foreign military intervention, abdicated in favor of his brother, Charles Felix. Because Charles Felix was in Modena at the time, Victor Emmanuel nominated Charles Albert as regent until Charles Felix's arrival. Immediately after his abdication Victor Emmanuel, escorted by troops of the Regiment "Cavalleggeri di Savoia", left Turin for exile in Nice. In the evening of 13 March, Regent Charles Albert, under pressure by the rebellious troops and population of Turin, published a proclamation conceding to a Savoyard version of the Spanish Constitution of 1812. However, King Charles Felix sent word from Modena that the concession of the constitution was null and void, that he had request Austria to intervene, and that Charles Albert was ordered to move with all loyal forces to Novara. At midnight on 21 March 1821, Charles Albert secretly departed Turin with the regiments "Piemonte Reale Cavalleria" and "Cavalleggeri di Savoia.

Meanwhile, in Novara, after the arrival of 200 dragoons of the Regiment "Dragoni del Re" outside the city's walls, the Regiment "Dragoni della Regina" abandoned its posts and joined with the rebellion. In the evening of 21 March, the rebellion reached Genoa, where a violent crowd attempted to storm the government palace. However, a small detachment of the Regiment "Dragoni del Re" charged the crowd and dispersed it after a brief fight. On 23 March, Charles Albert arrived in Novara, but six days later King Charles Felix ordered him to depart immediately for exile in the Grand Duchy of Tuscany. By then also the Brigade of "Saluzzo" and the Brigade of "Alessandria" had joined the rebellion, which amassed its troops in Alessandria. Of the six Sardinian cavalry regiments, 270 troops of the Regiment "Dragoni del Re", 300 troops of the Regiment "Dragoni della Regina", 350 troops of the Regiment "Cavalleggeri del Re", and 160 troops of the Regiment "Cavalleggeri di Piemonte" had joined the rebellion and assembled in Alessandria - some 1,080 troops in total. On the other side the government could count on the regiments "Piemonte Reale Cavalleria" and "Cavalleggeri di Savoia", and four squadrons of the Regiment "Cavalleggeri di Piemonte" - some 1,250 troops.

On 4 April 1821, loyal forces left Novara with the intent to reach Turin and reestablish royal authority in the city. The next day, the rebel forces left Alessandria and moved to intercept the loyal forces. On 6 April, the loyal forces fell back to Novara, where on 7 April the rebels arrived outside the city. During the night of 7 to 8 April, Austrian forces crossed the Ticino river and by morning a combined force of loyal and Austrian forces attacked the rebels from two sides. Now aware of the strength of the Austrian forces, the rebels retreated towards Vercelli, with the cavalry units covering the retreat against pursuing Austrian hussars. Once the rebels reached Vercelli, their army dissolved and the Austro-Sardinian forces occupied the city. The Austrian forces then moved to suppress the rebellion in Alessandria, while the Sardinian forces, with the three loyal cavalry regiments in front, moved to suppress the rebellion in Turin. On 10 April, Turin surrendered, followed by Alessandria one day later. On 19 April 1821, King Charles Felix appointed Ignazio Thaon di Revel as Lieutenant General of the Kingdom and tasked him with restoring order in the state.

On 31 May 1821, the four infantry brigades (Brigade of "Monferrato", Brigade of "Saluzzo", Brigade of "Alessandria", and Brigade of "Genova"), which had participated in the rebellion, were stricken from the rolls of the Royal Sardinian Army and their personnel dismissed from service. On 1 August 1821, the three cavalry regiments (Regiment "Dragoni del Re", Regiment "Dragoni della Regina", Regiment "Cavalleggeri del Re"), which had sided with the rebels were disbanded. On the same day, the detachment of the Regiment "Dragoni del Re", which had dispersed the rebels in Genova on 21 March, was used form a new dragoon regiment in Pinerolo, which was named Regiment "Dragoni del Génévois". The Génévois was a dukedom surrounding the city of Geneva and Duke of Génévois was one of the titles of the House of Savoy. Although that name "Dragoni del Génévois" had already been used between 1690 and 1774 by the regiment, which would become the Regiment "Cavalleggeri del Re", the new regiment was not allowed any association with earlier regiments and therefore i.e. the timpani captured in 1706 by the Regiment "Dragoni di Sua Altezza Reale" and the two Gold Medals of Military Valor awarded in 1796 to the Regiment "Dragoni di Sua Maestà" were transferred to state treasury. The troops of the three disbanded regiments, who had refused to join the rebellion, were divided among the four remaining cavalry regiments, each of which consisted of a staff and six squadrons grouped into three divisions.

After these events the Sardinian cavalry consisted of one heavy cavalry regiment (Regiment "Piemonte Reale Cavalleria"), two chevau-léger regiments (Regiment "Cavalleggeri di Piemonte", Regiment "Cavalleggeri di Savoia") and one dragoon regiment (Regiment "Dragoni del Génévois"). On 31 July 1827, the Regiment "Piemonte Reale Cavalleria" was expanded from six to eight squadrons, which were grouped into four divisions. At the time the regiment fielded 900 troops and 784 horses. On 24 December 1828, Regiment "Piemonte Reale Cavalleria", together with the other three cavalry regiments, ceded some of its personnel to help form a new Regiment "Dragoni di Piemonte".

On 27 April 1831, King Charles Felix died and Charles Albert ascended to the throne. On 29 August of the same year, all five Royal Sardinian Army cavalry regiments were reduced from eight to six squadrons and a depot squadron, which was to be formed in wartime and train new recruits. On the same date the division level was abolished. Later in the same year, on 3 November 1831, the personnel of the disbanded squadrons was used to reform the Regiment "Aosta Cavalleria". On 3 January 1832, the six Royal Sardinian Army cavalry regiments were renamed uniformly as "Cavalleria". The troops of five regiments were equipped with a flintlock musket, two flintlock pistols, and a sabre, while the troops of the Regiment "Piemonte Reale Cavalleria" continued to be equipped with a flintlock musket, two flintlock pistols, and a straight cavalry sword. As part of the same reform the identifying color of the Regiment "Piemonte Reale Cavalleria" was defined as scarlet, which is still used as the color of the regiment's gorget patches today.

On 7 March 1835, the six cavalry regiments were grouped into two brigades: the I Brigade consisted of the regiments "Nizza Cavalleria", "Savoia Cavalleria" and "Novara Cavalleria", while the II Brigade consisted of the regiments "Piemonte Reale Cavalleria", "Genova Cavalleria" and "Aosta Cavalleria". On 15 March 1836, the 6th Squadron of all six cavalry regiments was reorganized as a depot squadron. During the same year the troops of one squadron of each regiment, with the exception of the Regiment “Piemonte Reale Cavalleria”, replaced their flintlock musket with a lance. On 4 October of the same year, the number of brigades was increased from two to three and the regiments were reassigned: the I Brigade consisted now of the regiments "Nizza Cavalleria" and "Genova Cavalleria", the II Brigade of the regiments "Piemonte Reale Cavalleria" and "Novara Cavalleria", and the III Brigade of the regiments "Savoia Cavalleria" and "Aosta Cavalleria".

In 1841, all six regiments were uniformly organized and equipped: the troops of the regiments' first four squadrons were equipped with a flintlock musket, two flintlock pistols, and a sabre, while the troops of the regiments' fifth squadron were equipped with a lance, two flintlock pistols, and a sabre. On 1 January 1842, the six regiments disbanded their depot squadrons. In 1843, each regiments equipped a second squadron with lances. On 17 March 1845, all six regiments replaced their flintlock muskets and flintlock pistols with a percussion pistolone — a pistol with a shoulder stock and were issued lances. Afterwards all of the regiment's troops were equipped with a lance, a pistolone and a sabre.

=== Italian Wars of Independence ===
==== First Italian War of Independence ====
In 1848 revolutionary riots broke out in many parts of Europe, including numerous places in Italy. In March 1848, the revolts also spread into the Austrian Empire, where Milan (Five Days of Milan) and Venice (Republic of San Marco) rebelled against the House of Habsburg. The battles were particularly heated in Milan, where the commander of the army of Lombardy–Venetia, Marshal Josef Radetzky, was forced to abandon the city. As a result of this, other revolts broke out in Lombardy–Venetia. With Vienna itself in revolt, the Austrian Empire was tottering. On 23 March, one day after the end of the Five Days of Milan, King Charles Albert of Sardinia declared war on Austria. Thus began the First Italian War of Independence.

On the same day King Charles Albert declared war the Royal Sardinian Army's six cavalry regiments reformed their depot squadrons. At the start of the campaign the cavalry's I Brigade was attached to the I Army Corps, while the II Brigade was attached to the II Army Corps, while the III Brigade was attached to the army reserve division. On 25 March 1848, King Charles Albert ordered to issue all cavalry regiments a 60 cm wide square standard in the colors of the Italian flag with the arms of Savoy displayed in the center of the white pale. On 30 April 1848, the Regiment "Piemonte Cavalleria" clashed with Austrian forces in the Skirmish of Pastrengo. On 6 May, the regiment fought in the Battle of Santa Lucia. On 23 and 24 July, the Regiment "Piemonte Reale Cavalleria" fought at Sommacampagna, which was the prelude to the Battle of Custoza the next day. In the evening of 27 July 1848, after the defeat in the Battle of Volta Mantovana, King Charles Albert ordered a retreat towards Milan. On 9 August, the Austrian General Heinrich von Heß and the Sardinian General Carlo Canera di Salasco signed the Armistice of Salasco, which stated that Charles Albert's troops would withdraw from the whole of the Kingdom of Lombardy–Venetia, and the Duchy of Parma and Piacenza and Duchy of Modena and Reggio. Thus ended the war's First Campaign.

On 1 March 1849, the Sardinian Chamber of Deputies voted for the resumption of the war, with 94 votes in favour and 24 against. King Charles Albert decided that hostilities would resume on 20 March and, as stipulated in the 1848 armistice, the Austrians were informed about the continuation of the war eight days before the hostilities resumed. Charles Albert then massed his army near Novara. At noon on 20 March, the whole Austrian Army crossed the Ticino river at Pavia and marched North towards Mortara and Vigevano. In the night from 20 to 21 March 1849, the commander of the Regiment "Piemonte Reale Cavalleria", Colonel Rodolfo Gabrielli di Montevecchio, was sent with five companies of infantry, a company of Bersaglieri, a squadron of his regiment and two field guns to Borgo San Siro to slow down a possible Austrian advance to Vigevano, where the 2nd Sardinian Division was taking up position. At 11:00 the vanguard of the Austrian I Corps attacked the Italian units at Borgo San Siro. One hour later, Colonel Montevecchio, ordered his troops, which were in danger of being encircled, to fall back to Sforzesca. Colonel Montevecchio then led his squadron in a charge to cover the retreat. At Sforzesca the retreating troops met the Sardinian 17th Infantry Regiment and soon the Sardinian troops were encircled by Austrians. Colonel Montevecchio repeatedly charged with his squadron the Austrians to ease the pressure on the infantry holding Sforzesca. The Sardinian troops were reinforced by the 23rd Infantry Regiment and two additional squadrons of the Regiment "Piemonte Reale Cavalleria", which immediately charged the Austrian's flank. The Sardinian forces then pushed the Austrians 6 km back from Sforzesca, and the squadrons of the Regiment "Piemonte Reale Cavalleria" charged once more Austrian infantry, which tried to establish an Austrian defence line. By nightfall the Italian units fell back to Sforzesca.

On 23 March 1849, Field Marshal Radetzky decisively defeated the Sardinians in the Battle of Novara, even though the Regiment "Piemonte Reale Cavalleria" distinguished itself in battle again. In the evening of 23 March, King Charles Albert abdicated in favour of his son Victor Emmanuel. On 24 March, the new king met with Radetzky at Vignale and agreed to an armistice, which ended the short Second Campaign of the First Italian War of Independence.

For its valor in the Battle of Sforzesca and the Battle of Novara, and its conduct during the entire war the Regiment "Piemonte Reale Cavalleria" was awarded a Silver Medal of Military Valor, which was affixed to the regiment's standard.

After the defeat in the First Italian War of Independence the Kingdom of Sardinia reformed its military and, on 3 January 1850, the Regiment "Piemonte Reale Cavalleria" ceded its 6th Squadron to form the depot squadron of the newly formed Regiment "Cavalleggeri di Alessandria". On the same date, the Regiment "Piemonte Reale Cavalleria" was reduced to a staff, four squadrons, and a depot squadron, and the regiments "Nizza Cavalleria", "Savoia Cavalleria", and "Genova Cavalleria" were also assigned to the Royal Sardinian Army's heavy cavalry. On 22 September 1852, the Sardinian War Ministry ordered that the four line cavalry regiments, including the Regiment "Piemonte Reale Cavalleria", as well as the regiments "Cavalleggeri di Novara" and "Cavalleggeri di Aosta", should be armed with lance, sabre and pistolone.

In 1855, the regiment provided 32 volunteers for the Sardinian expeditionary corps' Provisional Light Cavalry Regiment, which fought in the Crimean War and distinguished itself on 16 August 1855 in the Battle of the Chernaya.

==== Second Italian War of Independence ====
On 21 July 1858, French Emperor Napoleon III and the Prime Minister of Sardinia Camillo Benso, Count of Cavour met in Plombières and reached a secret verbal agreement on a military alliance between the French Empire and the Kingdom of Sardinia against the Austrian Empire. On 9 March 1859, Sardinia mobilized its army, followed by Austria on 9 April. On 23 April, Austria delivered an ultimatum to Sardinia demanding its demobilization. Upon Sardinia's refusal, Austria declared war on 26 April and three days later the Austrians crossed the Ticino river into Piedmont. Consequently, France honored its alliance with Sardinia and declared war on Austria on 3 May 1859, which led to the Second Italian War of Independence.

In the early stages of the war the Regiment "Piemonte Reale Cavalleria" participated in the Sardinian advance across the Sesia river and, on 30 May 1859, the regiment fought in the Battle of Vinzaglio. On 11 July 1859, Emperor Napoleon III and Emperor Franz Joseph I met at Villafranca and concluded the Armistice of Villafranca, which ended the war. After the conclusion of the armistice the French and Sardinian armies occupied Lombardy. On 16 September 1859, the Royal Sardinian Army's nine cavalry regiments ceded one squadron each to help form three new Chevau-légers regiments and the three squadrons ceded by the cavalry regiments "Piemonte Reale Cavalleria", "Savoia Cavalleria", and "Genova Cavalleria" were used to form the Regiment "Cavalleggeri di Milano".

After having observed French cuirassier regiments, like the 12th Cuirassier Regiment, during the Second Italian War of Independence, the Royal Sardinian Army decided in October 1859 to reorganize its four line cavalry regiments as cuirassier regiments. Consequently, on 19 October 1859, the four regiments were renamed and the Regiment "Piemonte Reale Cavalleria" was redesigned Regiment "Corazzieri di Piemonte" (Regiment "Cuirassiers of Piedmont"). However, the four regiments were never issued cuirasses and, on 6 June 1860, the four regiments resumed their original names.

Earlier during the same year, on 5 May 1860, Giuseppe Garibaldi's Expedition of the Thousand had set off, with the support of the Sardinian government, from Genoa and landed on 11 May in Marsala in Sicily. On 15 May 1860, Garibaldi won the Battle of Calatafimi and the Sardinian government decided to send reinforcements to Sicily. This in turn triggered the Sardinian campaign in central and southern Italy, which commenced on 11 September 1860 with the Sardinian invasion of the papal states. On 14 September, the Regiment "Piemonte Reale Cavalleria" participated in the capture of Perugia. Afterwards the regiment participated in the Siege of Ancona. On 29 October, the regiment fought in the decisive Battle of the Garigliano.

For its conduct in the Battle of the Garigliano, the Regiment "Piemonte Reale Cavalleria" was awarded a Silver Medal of Military Valor, which was affixed to the regiment's standard. After the successful conclusion of Garibaldi's Expedition of the Thousand the Kingdom of Sardinia annexed the Kingdom of the Two Sicilies and most of the Papal Legations. On 17 March 1861, King Victor Emmanuel II proclaimed himself King of Italy.

==== Third Italian War of Independence ====
On 20 June 1866, the Third Italian War of Independence between the Kingdom of Italy and the Austrian Empire began. During the war the Regiment "Piemonte Reale Cavalleria" formed, together with the Regiment "Nizza Cavalleria", the II Cavalry of Brigade of the Line Cavalry Division. The division was assigned to the Army of the Mincio, which operated along the Mincio river. On 24 June 1866, two corps of the Army of the Mincio were defeated in the Battle of Custoza and the Line Cavalry Division was sent to cover the Italian retreat over the Mincio river. The focus of the campaign then shifted to the Army of the Po, which operated along the Po river and advanced from there into the Veneto.

On 1 January 1869, a milling tax came into force, which caused turmoil in many parts of Italy. On 3 January 1869, riots broke out in Budrio and the next day the Regiment "Piemonte Reale Cavalleria", which at the time was based in nearby Bologna, was sent to Budrio to quell the unrest. For having quickly restored order in Budrio, the Regiment "Piemonte Reale Cavalleria" was awarded a Bronze Medal of Military Valor, which was affixed to the regiment's standard.

On 10 September 1871, the regiment was renamed 2nd Cavalry Regiment (Piemonte Reale), and on 5 November 1876, Cavalry Regiment "Piemonte Reale" (2nd). In 1887, the regiment provided personnel and horses for the formation of the Mounted Hunters Squadron, which fought in the Italo-Ethiopian War of 1887–1889. In 1895-96, the regiment provided 68 enlisted for units deployed to Italian Eritrea for the First Italo-Ethiopian War. On 16 December 1897, the regiment was renamed Regiment "Piemonte Reale Cavalleria" (2nd).

On 1 October 1909, the regiment ceded its 3rd Squadron to help form the Regiment "Lancieri di Mantova" (25th). In 1911–12, the regiment provided six officers and 66 enlisted to units deployed for the Italo-Turkish War.

=== World War I ===
At the outbreak of World War I the regiment consisted of a command, a depot, and two cavalry groups, with the I Group consisting of three squadrons and the II Group consisting of two squadrons and a machine gun section. On 24 May 1915, the day Italy entered the war, the regiment was assigned to the newly formed XIII Army Corps, while two of the regiment's squadrons were detached to the newly formed XIV Army Corps. In April 1916, the Regiment "Genova Cavalleria" (4th) was dismounted for service in the trenches of the Italian front and reinforced, for the duration of its service in the trenches, by the dismounted 1st Squadron of the Regiment "Piemonte Reale Cavalleria" (2nd). In August 1916, three of the regiment's remaining squadrons were assigned to a provisional cavalry brigade, which fought in the Sixth Battle of the Isonzo and was the first Italian unit to enter the conquered city of Gorizia.

In 1917, the regiment's depot in Rome formed the 1496th Dismounted Machine Gunners Company as reinforcement for the regiment. On 24 October 1917, the Imperial German Army and Austro-Hungarian Army began the Battle of Caporetto and already on the first day of the battle the German 14th Army broke through the Italian lines at Kobarid. All mounted Italian cavalry regiments were sent forward to cover the retreat of the Italian 2nd Army and 3rd Army from the Isonzo front. The Regiment "Piemonte Reale Cavalleria" (2nd) was given the task to form the rearguard of the XIII Army Corps and delay the enemy to allow the army corps to escape across the Tagliamento and then the Piave rivers. By 8 November, the regiment had fallen back to a line between the villages of Chiarano and Cessalto, where it defeated two enemy attacks. In the evening of the same day, the regiment's commander Colonel Francesco Rossi was informed that the XIII Army Corps had successfully crossed the Piave river and the rearguard should now also fall back across the Piave. Colonel Rossi ordered that dismounted troops and the wounded should leave first, followed by the remaining mounted squadrons, while he and his staff would retreat as last. After the last Italian troops had departed Cessalto Colonel Rossi and his staff began their retreat, but in the hamlet of Santa Maria di Campagna they were surrounded by Austro-Hungarian troops. Colonel Rossi refused Austro-Hungarian calls to surrender and in the following clash he and his entire staff were killed. For his sacrifice Colonel Rossi was awarded posthumously Italy's highest military honor, the Gold Medal of Military Valor.

In June 1918, the regiment fought in the Second Battle of the Piave River, during which one of the regiment's platoon charged advancing Austro-Hungarian troops near Monastier di Treviso. On 24 October 1918, the Royal Italian Army began the Battle of Vittorio Veneto and on 29 October the Regiment "Piemonte Reale Cavalleria" (2nd) crossed the Piave river at the island of Grave di Papadopoli. The next day, on 30 October, the regiment, like all cavalry regiments, was ordered to pursue the retreating Austro-Hungarian armies. The regiment advanced to Portogruaro, San Giorgio di Nogaro and then to Cervignano, where the regiment captured an enemy division command. As the Armistice of Villa Giusti between Italy and Austria-Hungary was to come into effect at 15:00 on 4 November the regiment formed a detachment of troops, which rode rapidly to the city of Trieste and entered it just before the armistice came into effect.

=== Interwar years ===
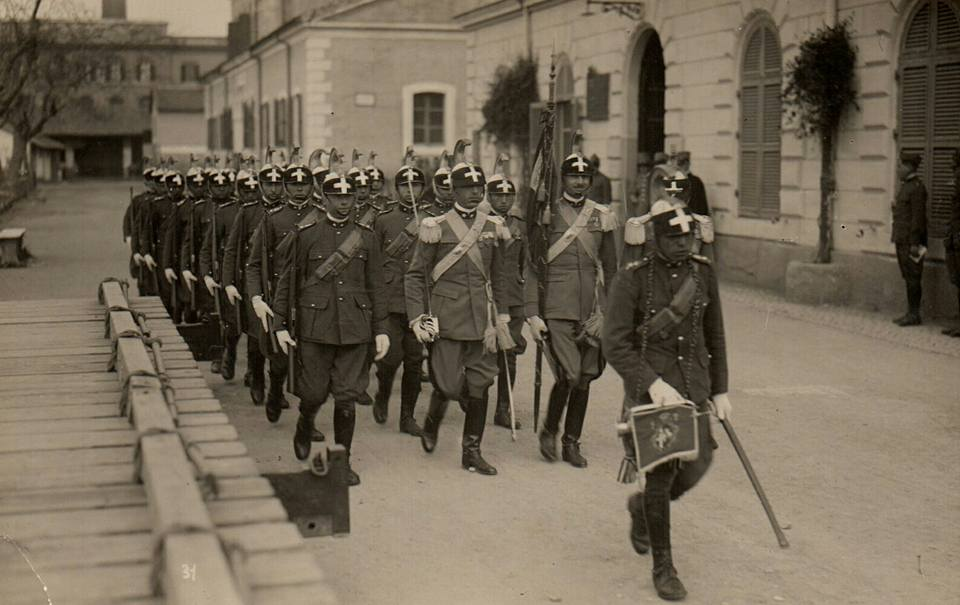
One of the regiment's platoons in 1931

After the war the Royal Italian Army disbanded the second groups of all thirty cavalry regiments, while the first groups were reduced to two squadrons. On 21 November 1919, 14 cavalry regiments were disbanded and their groups transferred to 14 of the remaining cavalry regiments, while the Regiment "Nizza Cavalleria" (1st) and Regiment "Piemonte Cavalleria" (2nd) reformed their second groups with personnel drawn from the cavalry regiments' disbanded machine gunner squadrons.

On 20 May 1920, the Royal Italian Army disbanded five additional cavalry regiments, among them the Regiment "Cavalleggeri di Lodi" (15th), whose I Squadrons Group was assigned to the Regiment "Lancieri di Firenze" (9th), which in turn ceded one of its squadrons to the Regiment "Piemonte Reale Cavalleria" (2nd). Furthermore, on the same date, the Regiment "Piemonte Reale Cavalleria" (2nd) retired its lances and was renamed Regiment "Piemonte Reale Cavalleria".

In January 1933, the Regiment "Piemonte Reale Cavalleria" replaced the Regiment "Cavalleggeri di Monferrato" in the I Cavalry Brigade, which was assigned to the 1st Fast Division based in Udine. Consequently the Regiment "Piemonte Reale Cavalleria" moved from Rome to Udine. On 1 January 1935, the division and brigade received the name "Eugenio di Savoia".

=== Second Italo-Ethiopian War ===
In June 1935, Regiment "Piemonte Reale Cavalleria" provided two officers and 255 enlisted to help form the I and II truck-mounted machine gunners groups of the Regiment "Genova Cavalleria" and ten officers and 106 enlisted for the formation of the IV Fast Tanks Group "Duca degli Abruzzi" of the Regiment "Cavalleggeri Guide". The groups were formed in preparation for the Second Italo-Ethiopian War. The regiment also provided ten officers and 150 enlisted for other units deployed to East Africa for the war.

In 1938, the Regiment "Piemonte Reale Cavalleria" moved from Udine to Meran and, in October of the same year, the regiment was replaced by the Regiment "Cavalleggeri di Alessandria" in the 1st Cavalry Division "Eugenio di Savoia".

=== World War II ===
At the outbreak of World War II the regiment consisted of a command, a command squadron, the 5th Machine Gunners Squadron, and the I and II squadrons groups, which both consisted of two mounted squadrons. The regiment fielded 37 officers, 37 non-commissioned officers, 798 enlisted troops and 818 horses. The regiment was equipped with one car, six motorcycles, 16 trucks, 36 Breda mod. 30 light machine guns, and 12 Fiat mod. 35 heavy machine guns. In September 1940, the regiment's depot in Meran formed the LII Dismounted Group "Piemonte Reale Cavalleria", which remained in South Tyrol on garrison duty throughout the war.

In April 1941, the regiment participated in the invasion of Yugoslavia. From May 1941 to June 1942, the regiment was stationed in Croatia, where it fought Yugoslav partisans. On 1 August 1942, the regiment joined, together with the Regiment "Nizza Cavalleria" and Regiment "Genova Cavalleria", the 2nd Cavalry Division "Emanuele Filiberto Testa di Ferro".

On 13 November 1942, the division moved to southern France, which had been occupied by German-Italian forces three days earlier in the operation Case Anton. The division initially garrisoned Nice, before assuming coastal defense duties between Antibes and Saint Tropez. In December the division moved further East and replaced the 58th Infantry Division "Legnano" along the coast from Antibes to Menton.

On 4 September 1943, the division was recalled to Italy in preparation for the announcement of the Armistice of Cassibile and the expected German reaction. In the evening of 8 September 1943, the Armistice of Cassibile, which ended hostilities between the Kingdom of Italy and the Anglo-American Allies, was announced by General Dwight D. Eisenhower on Radio Algiers and by Marshal Pietro Badoglio on Italian radio. Germany reacted by invading Italy. On 9 September, the 2nd Cavalry Division "Emanuele Filiberto Testa di Ferro" blocked German attempts to enter Turin. The next day most of the division moved towards the Val Maira and Val Varaita valleys in an attempt to keep the retreat route for the Italian units in southern France open. On 10 September 1943, the Regiment "Piemonte Reale Cavalleria" was forced to surrender to overwhelming German forces near Savigliano.

=== Cold War ===
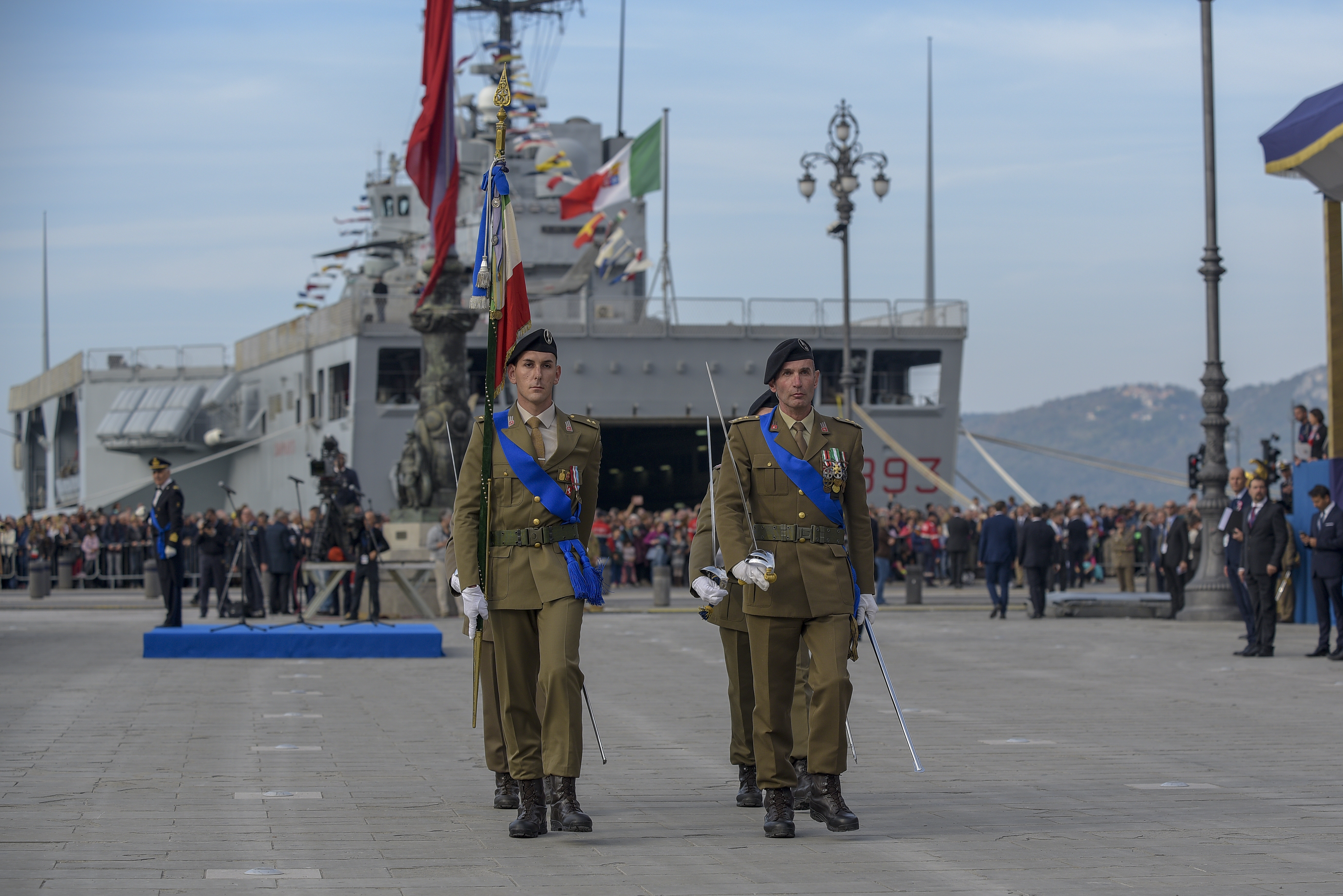
Regiment "Piemonte Cavalleria" (2nd) standard during a ceremony in Trieste 2018

On 10 September 1946, the Italian Army decided to form five divisional reconnaissance groups, among them the 2nd Cavaliers Reconnaissance Group (Italian: Gruppo Esplorante 2° Cavalieri), which received the traditions and scarlet gorget patches of the Regiment "Piemonte Reale Cavalleria" (2nd). On 16 November 1946, the group became operational in Meran. In 1947 the group moved from Meran to Florence, where it joined the Infantry Division "Friuli". In December 1948, the group was renamed Armored Cavalry Group "Piemonte". On 15 May 1949, the group was expanded to 2nd Armored Cavalry Regiment "Piemonte Cavalleria". The regiment, which upon its formation received the standard of Regiment "Piemonte Reale Cavalleria" (2nd), consisted of a command, a command squadron, and two squadrons groups equipped with M26 Pershing tanks. In May 1951, the regiment formed a third squadrons group. In 1956, the regiment moved from Florence to Trieste. On 1 April 1957, the regiment was assigned, together with the 4th Armored Cavalry Regiment "Genova Cavalleria", 5th Armored Cavalry Regiment "Lancieri di Novara" and 8th Self-propelled Field Artillery Regiment, to the newly formed Cavalry Brigade. On 4 November 1958, the 2nd Armored Cavalry Regiment "Piemonte Cavalleria" was renamed Regiment "Piemonte Cavalleria" (2nd), while on 1 January 1959, the Cavalry Brigade was renamed Cavalry Brigade "Pozzuolo del Friuli". In 1966, the regiment moved from Trieste to Villa Opicina.

During the 1975 army reform the army disbanded the regimental level and newly independent battalions were granted for the first time their own flags, respectively in the case of cavalry units, their own standard. On 30 September 1975, the Regiment "Piemonte Cavalleria" (2nd) in Villa Opicina and the regiment's III Squadrons Group in Trieste were disbanded. The next day, on 1 October 1975, the regiment's I Squadrons Group in Villa Opicina was reorganized and renamed 2nd Mechanized Squadrons Group "Piemonte Cavalleria", while the regiment's II Squadrons Group in Sgonico was reorganized and renamed 9th Tank Squadrons Group "Lancieri di Firenze". Furthermore, on the same day, the personnel of the disbanded regiment's headquarters was used to form the headquarters of the Armored Brigade "Vittorio Veneto" in Villa Opicina. Afterwards, the 2nd Mechanized Squadrons Group "Piemonte Cavalleria" and 9th Tank Squadrons Group "Lancieri di Firenze", were assigned to the Armored Brigade "Vittorio Veneto", which also included the 6th Tank Squadrons Group "Lancieri di Aosta", 8th Self-propelled Field Artillery Group "Pasubio", and Logistic Battalion "Vittorio Veneto". The 2nd Mechanized Squadrons Group "Piemonte Cavalleria" consisted of a command, a command and services squadron, three mechanized squadrons with M113 armored personnel carriers, and a heavy mortar squadron with M106 mortar carriers with 120mm mod. 63 mortars. At the time the squadrons group fielded 896 men (45 officers, 100 non-commissioned officers, and 751 soldiers).

On 12 November 1976, the President of the Italian Republic Giovanni Leone assigned with decree 846 the standard and traditions of the Regiment "Piemonte Cavalleria" (2nd) to the 2nd Mechanized Squadrons Group "Piemonte Cavalleria.

For its conduct and work after the 1976 Friuli earthquake the squadrons group was awarded a Bronze Medal of Army Valor, which was affixed to the squadrons group's standard and added to its coat of arms.

=== Recent times ===
After the end of the Cold War the Italian Army began to draw down its forces and the Mechanized Brigade "Vittorio Veneto" was one of the first brigades to disband. On 31 July 1991, the brigade was disbanded along with most of its subordinate units. On the same day, the 2nd Mechanized Squadrons Group "Piemonte Cavalleria" lost its autonomy and the next day, on 1 August 1991, the squadrons group entered the 2nd Regiment "Piemonte Cavalleria". On the same day, the standard and traditions of the Regiment "Piemonte Cavalleria" (2nd) were transferred from the squadrons group to the regiment, which on the same date joined the Cavalry Brigade "Pozzuolo del Friuli". One year later, on 1 August 1992, the regiment was renamed Regiment "Piemonte Cavalleria" (2nd). The regiment consisted of a command, a command and services squadron, and a squadrons group with three armored squadrons equipped with wheeled Centauro tank destroyers.

In 1993-94, the regiment deployed a Centauro platoon to Somalia for the United Nations Operation in Somalia II. From July 2000 to August 2001, the regiment deployed one of its squadrons to Bosnia and Herzegovina for the NATO-led Stabilisation Force in Bosnia and Herzegovina. In 2005, one of the regiment's platoons deployed to Iraq for Operation Antica Babilonia. On 1 October 2014, the regiment was transferred from the Cavalry Brigade "Pozzuolo del Friuli" to the Alpine Brigade "Julia".

== Organization ==
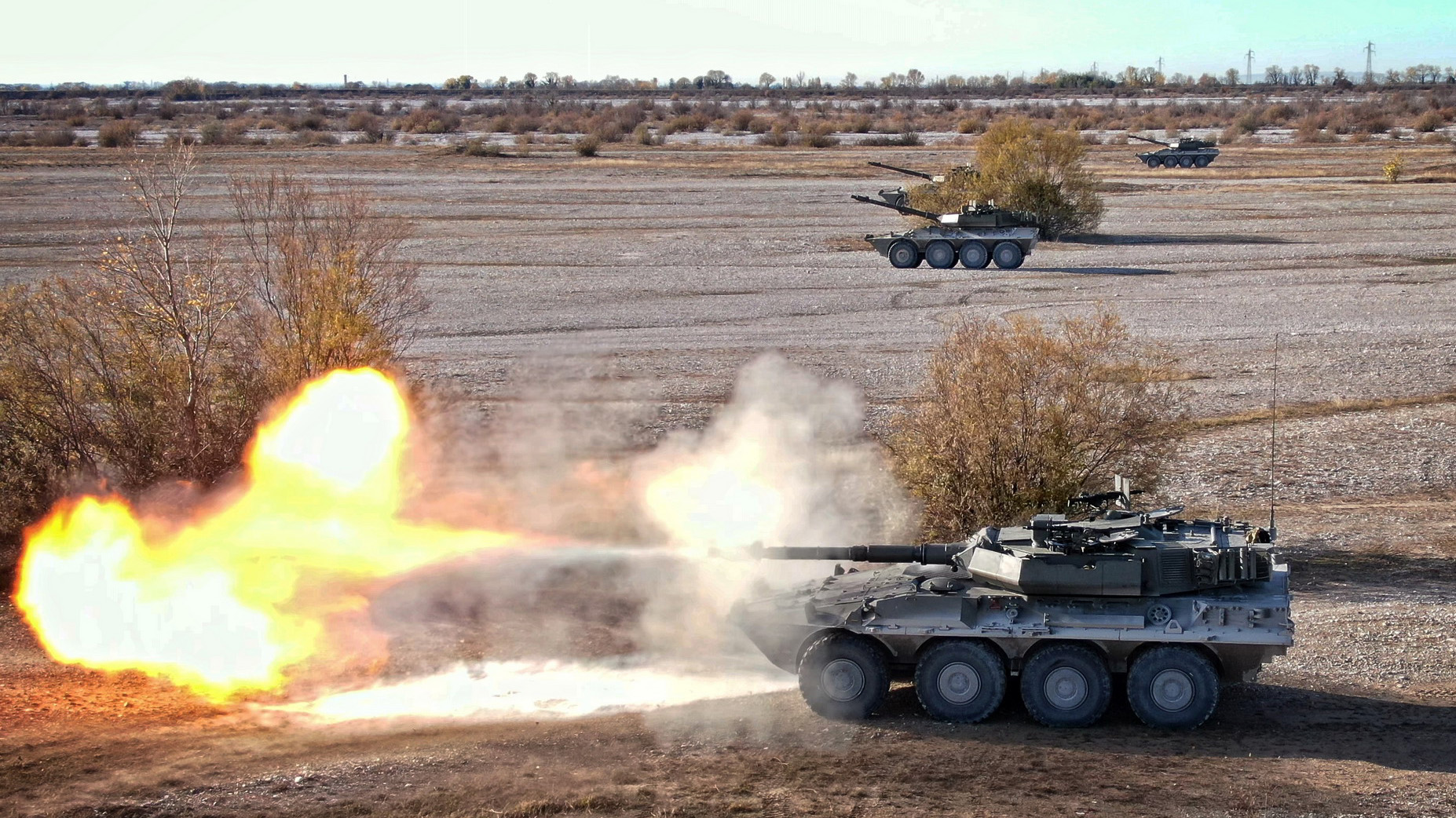
"Piemonte Cavalleria" Centauro tank destroyers during a training exercise in Friuli

As of 2025 the Regiment "Piemonte Cavalleria" (2nd) is organized as follows:

- Regiment "Piemonte Cavalleria" (2nd), in Villa Opicina
  - Command and Logistic Support Squadron
  - 1st Reconnaissance Squadrons Group
    - 1st Reconnaissance Squadron
    - 2nd Reconnaissance Squadron
    - 3rd Reconnaissance Squadron
    - Heavy Armored Squadron

The three reconnaissance squadrons are equipped with Lince vehicles and Centauro tank destroyers, which are scheduled to be replaced by Lince 2 vehicles and Freccia EVO Reconnaissance vehicles. The Heavy Armored Squadron is equipped with Centauro tank destroyers, which are being replaced by Centauro 2 tank destroyers.

== See also ==
- Alpine Brigade "Julia"
