= Battle of Versa =

- Part of the Third Italian War of Independence
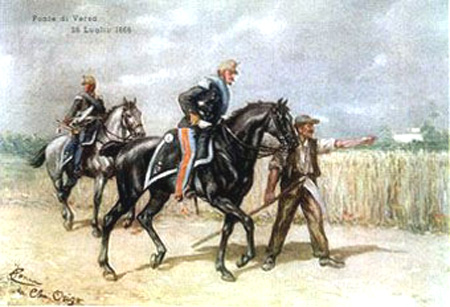
- The Regiment Lancieri di Firenze at Ponte di Versa
Date	26 July 1866
Location	Versa, Venetia
Result	Italian victory

Belligerents
Kingdom of Italy	Austrian Empire

Commanders and leaders
Alberto La Forest de Divonne	Török

Strength
2,000	2,800

Casualties and losses
6 killed 29 wounded 30 missing	30 killed 64 wounded 83 missing

The Battle of Versa took place on the 26 July 1866 during the Third Italian War of Independence in the Italian unification process.

The Italian army, jointly commanded by Alberto La Forest de Divonne, defeated the Austrian army guarding the crossing of the Torre river at Ponte di Versa, present-day fraction of Romans d'Isonzo in the province of Gorizia. This marked the maximum Italian advance into Friuli.

== Order of Battle ==
- Austrian Army:
  - Two squadrons of the Württemberg Hussar Regiment (300 men)
  - 18 companies of the Regiments "Archduke L. Vittore", "Nagy", "Grand Duke of Tuscany" (2,500 men)
  - 7th Artillery Regiment (2 pieces)
- Italian Army:
  - Five cavalry squadrons of the 9th Regiment "Lancieri di Firenze" (400 men)
  - Fourteen companies of the X, XVI, XXII, and XXXV Bersaglieri battalions (1,600 men)
  - 5th Battery of the 8th Artillery Regiment (6 pieces)

== Battle ==
The battle took place after noon and continued until 14:00 on the wooden bridge over the Torre river, between the Italian army arriving from Palmanova, as the vanguard of Cialdini's expedition, and the Austrian troops encamped on the bank left of the Torre torrent.

After the war, 38 Italian soldiers were awarded, and the Regiment "Lancieri di Firenze" was awarded a Bronze Medal of Military Valor.

In 2016, some graves of the soldiers who fell during the battle were found in the bed of the Torre.

== See also ==
- Italian unification
- Regiment "Lancieri di Firenze" (9th)
- Torre

== Bibliography ==
- Massimo Portelli (1966). La Campagna del 1866 nel Friuli Orientale: il combattimento di Verta e armistizio di Cormons. Gorizia.
- Alberto Prelli (2009). Palma 1866: cronaca di un assedio incruento (PDF). Quaderni del Civico Museo Storico Palmanova. Archived from the original (PDF) on 2016-10-20.
