= Armored Brigade "Vittorio Veneto" =

Brigata Corazzata "Vittorio Veneto"
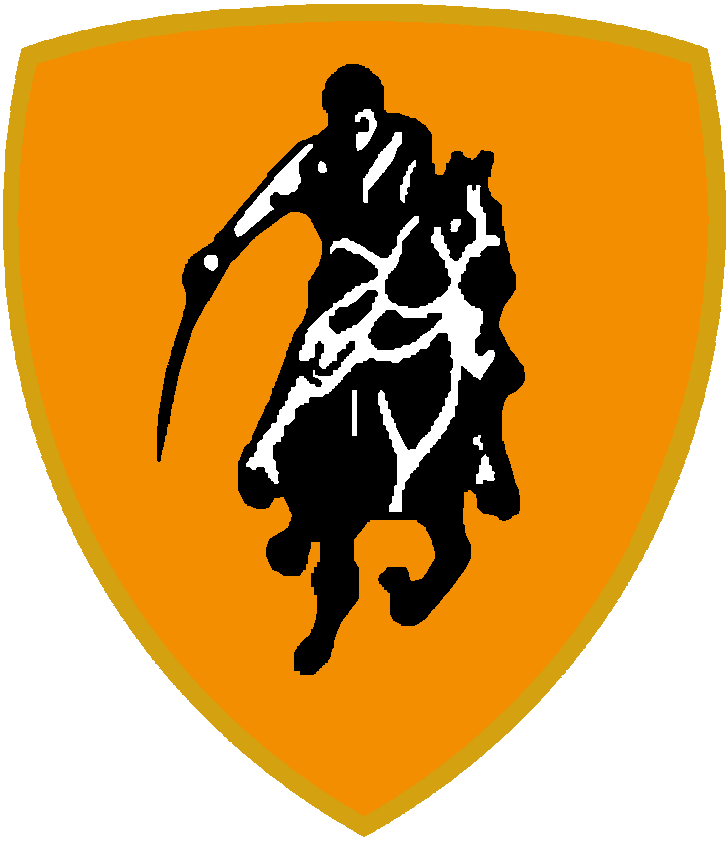
- Coat of Arms of the Armored Brigade "Vittorio Veneto"
- Active: 1 October 1975 – 31 July 1991
- Country: Italy
- Branch: Italian Army
- Type: Cavalry
- Role: Armored warfare
- Part of: 1975-1986 Mechanized Division "Folgore"; 1986-1991 5th Army Corps
- Garrison/HQ: Villa Opicina

The Armored Brigade "Vittorio Veneto" was an armored brigade of the Italian Army. Its core units were armored and mechanized cavalry squadrons groups. The brigade's headquarters was in the city of Villa Opicina, with most of its units based in the Province of Trieste. The brigade's name was chosen to remember the decisive Italian World War I victory at the Battle of Vittorio Veneto.

== History ==
The brigade was activated during the 1975 Italian Army reform, during which the regimental level was abolished and battalions came under direct command of newly formed multi-arms brigades. On 1 October 1975 the Armored Brigade "Vittorio Veneto" was split from the Cavalry Brigade "Pozzuolo del Friuli", with the two tank squadrons groups of the Regiment "Piemonte Cavalleria" (2nd) becoming the 2nd Mechanized Squadrons Group "Piemonte Cavalleria", respectively the 9th Tank Squadrons Group "Lancieri di Firenze", and the regiment's Command Squadron used to create the Command and Signal Unit "Vittorio Veneto". The 8th Self-propelled Field Artillery Regiment of the Pozzuolo del Friuli was also split and the newly formed 8th Self-propelled Field Artillery Group "Pasubio" joined the Vittorio Veneto. To bring the brigade to full strength the Infantry Division "Mantova"'s reconnaissance unit, the VI Reconnaissance Squadrons Group "Lancieri di Aosta" in Cervignano del Friuli, was reorganized as a tank squadrons group and transferred to the Vittorio Veneto. Additionally a number of smaller units were raised for the Vittorio Veneto, which joined the Mechanized Division "Folgore".

The "Folgore" Division, based in Treviso in North-Eastern Italy, was part of the 5th Army Corps, which was tasked with defending the Yugoslav-Italian border against attacks by either the Warsaw Pact, or Yugoslavia, or both. The Vittorio Veneto's mission was to defend the Province of Trieste from the city of Trieste to the Timavo river, while the Trieste Troops Command, a brigade-sized infantry formation consisting mostly of reserve units, was to defend the city itself. The brigade's authorized strength was 3,381 men (214 Officers, 516 non-commissioned officers and 2,651 soldiers) and it was initially composed of the following units:

- Armored Brigade "Vittorio Veneto", in Villa Opicina
  - Command and Signal Unit "Vittorio Veneto", in Villa Opicina
  - 2nd Mechanized Squadrons Group "Piemonte Cavalleria", in Villa Opicina
  - 6th Tank Squadrons Group "Lancieri di Aosta", in Cervignano del Friuli (Leopard 1A2 main battle tanks)
  - 9th Tank Squadrons Group "Lancieri di Firenze", in Sgonico (Leopard 1A2 main battle tanks
  - 8th Self-propelled Field Artillery Group "Pasubio", in Banne (M109G 155 mm self-propelled howitzers)
  - Logistic Battalion "Vittorio Veneto", in Cervignano del Friuli
  - Anti-tank Squadron "Vittorio Veneto", in Banne (BGM-71 TOW anti-tank guided missiles)
  - Engineer Company "Vittorio Veneto", in Cervignano del Friuli

On 31 October 1986 the Italian Army abolished the divisional level and brigades, that until then had been under one of the Army's four divisions, came forthwith under direct command of the Army's 3rd or 5th Army Corps. The Vittorio Veneto came under the 5th Army Corps. The same year the brigade gained three additional units and became a mechanized brigade. After the 1986 reform the Vittorio Veneto was composed of the following units:

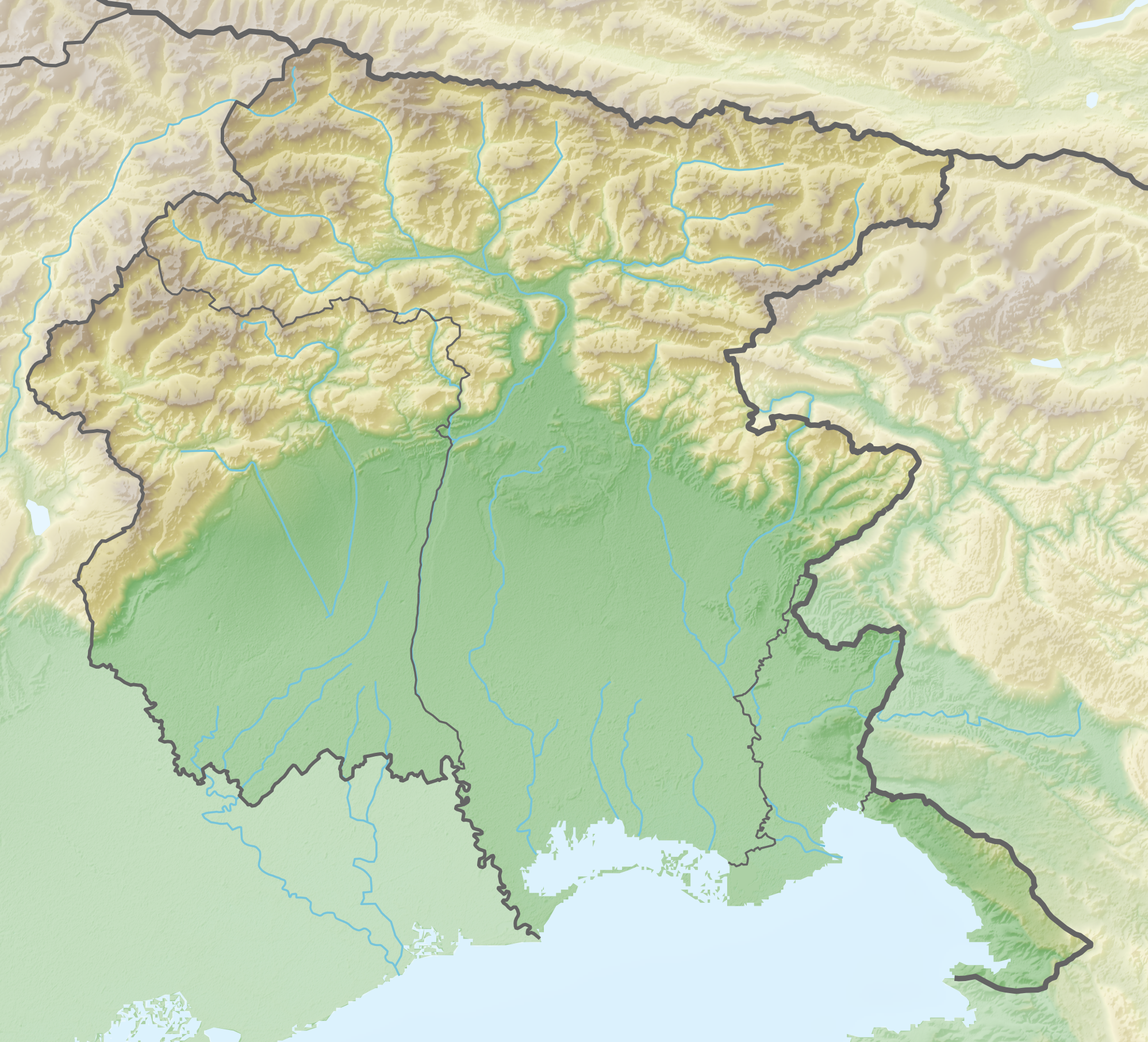
Vittorio Veneto units in 1989
- Mechanized Brigade "Vittorio Veneto", in Villa Opicina
  - Command and Signal Unit "Vittorio Veneto", in Villa Opicina
  - 1st Motorized Infantry Battalion "San Giusto", in Trieste (transferred from the disbanded Trieste Troops Command)
  - 2nd Mechanized Squadrons Group "Piemonte Cavalleria", in Villa Opicina, (VCC-2 Armoured personnel carriers)
  - 6th Tank Squadrons Group "Lancieri di Aosta", in Cervignano del Friuli, (Leopard 1A2 Main battle tanks)
  - 9th Mechanized Squadrons Group "Lancieri di Firenze", in Sgonico, (VCC-2 Armoured personnel carriers)
  - 12th Mechanized Squadrons Group "Cavalleggeri di Saluzzo", in Gorizia, (VCC-2 Armoured personnel carriers, transferred from the disbanded Mechanized Division "Folgore")
  - 33rd Infantry Fortification Battalion "Ardenza", in Fogliano Redipuglia (transferred from the Mechanized Brigade "Gorizia")
  - 8th Self-propelled Field Artillery Group "Pasubio", in Banne, (M109 Self-propelled howitzers)
  - Logistic Battalion "Vittorio Veneto", in Cervignano del Friuli
  - Anti-tank Squadron "Vittorio Veneto", in Banne
  - Engineer Company "Vittorio Veneto", in Cervignano del Friuli

After the end of the Cold War the Italian Army began to draw down its forces and the Vittorio Veneto was one of the first brigades to disband. On 1 February 1991 the 1st Motorized Infantry Battalion "San Giusto" was renamed 1st Battalion "San Giusto" and tasked with the training of recruits. On 31 July 1991 the brigade was officially deactivated along with most of its subordinate units. Some of the brigade's units were transferred to other brigades: 2nd "Piemonte Cavalleria" and 8th "Pasubio" joined the Cavalry Brigade "Pozzuolo del Friuli", the 6th "Lancieri di Aosta" transferred to Palermo and joined the Mechanized Brigade "Aosta", while the 9th "Lancieri di Firenze" moved to Grosseto and joined the Motorized Brigade "Friuli", while the 1st Battalion "San Giusto" came under direct command of the 5th Army Corps.

== Reactivation ==
On 1 July 2019 the Italian Army renamed the Division "Friuli" in Florence as Division "Vittorio Veneto", which carries on the traditions of the brigade.
