= Alberto La Forest de Divonne =

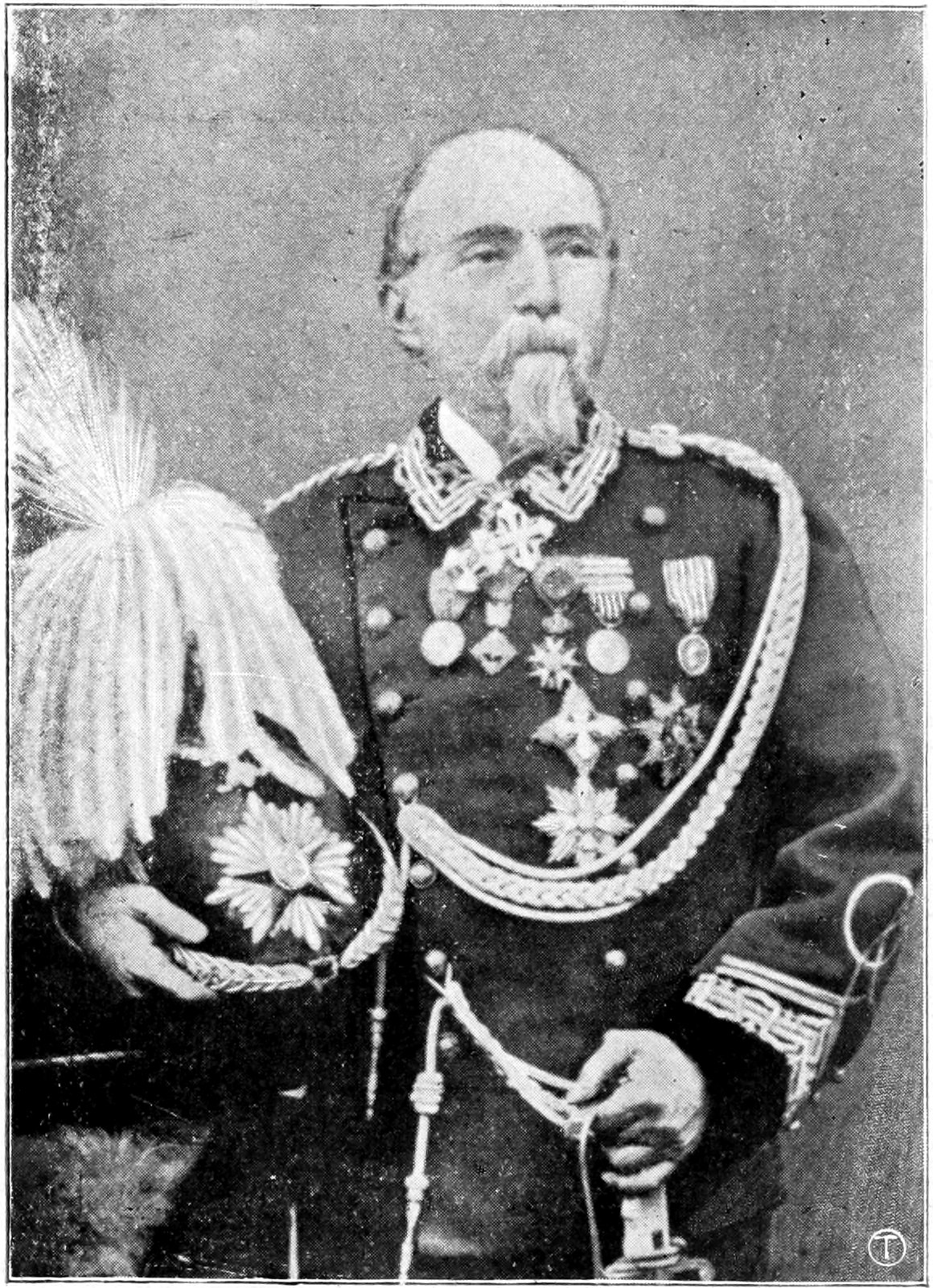
- Born: March 13, 1818; Besançon, Doubs, France
- Died: April 19, 1893 (aged 75); Turin, Piedmont, Italy
- Education: Royal Academy of Turin
- Military career
- Allegiance: Sardinia-Piedmont; Kingdom of Italy
- Branch: Royal Sardinian Army; Royal Italian Army
- Service years: 1848 – 1870
- Rank: Lieutenant General
- Conflicts: First Italian War of Independence; Second Italian War of Independence: Battle of Montebello; Battle of San Martino; Third Italian War of Independence: Battle of Versa

Alberto Carlo Gilberto de la Forest de Divonne (1818–1893) was an Italian general who served in the Italian Wars of Independence against the Austrian Empire.

== Biography ==
A member of a noble family of count's rank originally from Savoy, Albert was the son of Cyrille de la Forest Divonne and his wife, Elise de Fontette.

Later he migrated to Piedmont with his family and was in the Kingdom of Sardinia and Alberto was able to attend the Military Academy of Turin and thus become part of the Royal Sardinian army. Having become the first page of King Carlo Alberto, in 1859 he took part in the Second Italian War of Independence with the rank of squadron leader of the cavalrymen of Aosta, distinguishing himself in the Battle of Montebello and in that of San Martino, actions following which he was promoted to rank of lieutenant colonel and obtained the command of the cavalrymen of Monferrato as well as being awarded the Legion of Honor by the allied French government.

Alberto became a permanently naturalized Italian in 1870, he obtained from King Umberto I the recognition of the title of count that his family had already carried in France since the 18th century.

He was promoted to the rank of Lieutenant General and he died in Turin in 1893, at the age of 75.

== Awards ==
- Order of Saints Maurice and Lazarus
- Order of the Crown of Italy
- Military Order of Savoy
- Medal of Military Valor (Silver)
- Commemorative Medal of the Unity of Italy

=== Foreign Awards ===
- Austrian Empire: Order of Franz Joseph (Knight)
- France: Legion of Honour (Officer)
- France: Commemorative medal of the 1859 Italian Campaign
