= Regiment "Lancieri di Firenze" (9th) =

Inactive Italian Army lancer unit

- Reggimento "Lancieri di Firenze" (9°)
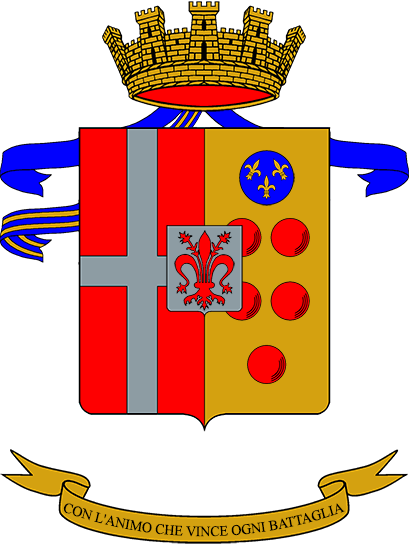
- Regimental coat of arms
- Active: 13 Sept. 1753 — 1800; 21 July 1803 — 1 July 1809; 1814 — 8 Sept. 1943; 1 Oct. 1975 — 7 Oct. 1995
- Country: Italy
- Branch: Italian Army
- Part of: Mechanized Brigade "Friuli"
- Garrison/HQ: Grosseto
- Motto: "Con l'animo che vince ogni battaglia"
- Anniversaries: 30 October 1918 - Battle of Vittorio Veneto
- Decorations: 2× Bronze Medals of Military Valor; 1× Bronze Medal of Army Valor

Insignia
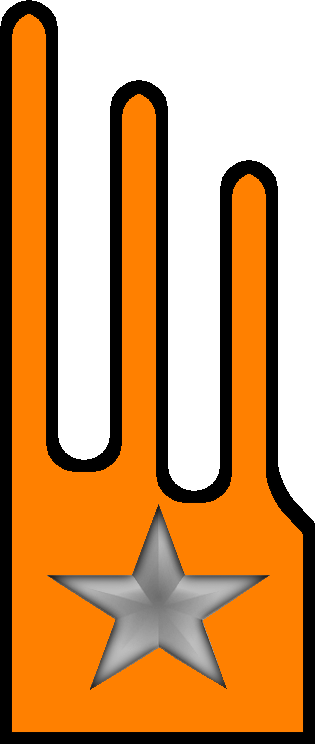
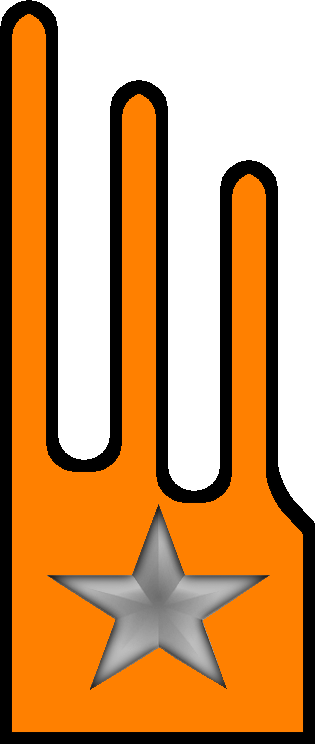
- Regimental gorget patches

The Regiment "Lancieri di Firenze" (9th) (Italian: Reggimento "Lancieri di Firenze" (9°) - "Lancers of Florence") is an inactive cavalry unit of the Tuscan Army, French Imperial Army, Royal Sardinian Army, and Italian Army. In 1753, Grand Duke Francis ordered to commence the formation of a dragoons regiment, which would become the only regular cavalry regiment of the Grand Duchy of Tuscany. In 1799, the regiment fought against French forces in the War of the Second Coalition. One year later the regiment was disbanded, but in 1803 it was reformed. In 1808, the regiment was incorporated into the French Imperial Army. The regiment then fought in Napoleon's invasion of Spain and invasion of Russia, during which the regiment reached Madrid respectively Moscow.

In 1848, the regiment fought in the first campaign of the First Italian War of Independence. In 1859, during the Second Italian War of Independence, Grand Duke Leopold II fled Tuscany, which allied with the Kingdom of Sardinia against the Austrian Empire. On 18 March 1860, the Kingdom of Sardinia annexed Tuscany and one week later, on 25 March 1860, the regiment was incorporated into the Royal Sardinian Army. The Regiment "Cavalleggeri di Firenze" was the only regiment of a pre-unification Italian state allowed to retain its regimental honors and traditions upon entering the Royal Sardinian Army.

In 1866, the regiment fought in the Third Italian War of Independence and in 1911-12 in the Italo-Turkish War. During World War I the regiment fought on the Italian front. In 1935, the regiment was assigned to the 2nd Cavalry Division, with which it participated in 1941 in the invasion of Yugoslavia. In 1942-43, the regiment served on anti-partisan duty in Albania. After the announcement of the Armistice of Cassibile on 8 September 1943, the regiment's officers hid the regiment's standard and then dissolved the regiment.

In 1951, during the Cold War, the Italian Army formed an armored squadron, which was given the name and traditions of the regiment. The squadron was assigned to the Armored Division "Pozzuolo del Friuli" as the division's reconnaissance unit. In 1956, the squadron was expanded to squadrons group, but already on 31 December 1957 the unit was disbanded. In 1975, the regiment's name, standard, and traditions were assigned to the 9th Tank Squadrons Group "Lancieri di Firenze", which was assigned to the Armored Brigade "Vittorio Veneto". In 1992, the squadrons group lost its autonomy and entered the reformed Regiment "Lancieri di Firenze" (9th). In 1995, the regiment was disbanded and regiment's standard transferred to the Shrine of the Flags in the Vittoriano in Rome for safekeeping.

The regiment's anniversary falls on 30 October 1918, the day the regiment occupied the city of Vittorio during the Battle of Vittorio Veneto, for which the regiment was awarded a Bronze Medal of Military Valor. As the regiment is a lancer unit, its enlisted personnel is addressed as "Lancer" (Italian: Lanciere).

== History ==
=== Formation ===
In 1733, the War of the Polish Succession pitted the House of Habsburg and against the House of Bourbon. In 1734-35, Charles of Parma led Bourbon forces in the conquest of the Kingdom of Naples and Kingdom of Sicily. In October 1735, a preliminary peace was concluded: Charles of Parma ceded the Duchy of Parma to the Habsburgs and renounced his right to inherit the Grand Duchy of Tuscany, but he was compensated by being confirmed as king of Naples and Sicily. Stanisław Leszczyński, the father in law of the Fenech King, abdicated the Polish throne and was compensated with the duchies of Lorraine and of Bar in France. In turn Francis, Duke of Lorraine renounced his title as Duke of Lorraine and was compensated with the Grand Duchy of Tuscany. On 12 February 1736, Francis married Archduchess Maria Theresa, the heiress of the Habsburg monarchy.

On 5 January 1737, instruments of cession were signed at Pontremoli between Spain and the Empire, with Spain ceding Parma and Tuscany to the Holy Roman Empire and the Empire recognizing Charles of Parma as King of Naples and Sicily. On 10 January 1737, Spanish troops began their withdrawal from Tuscany, and were replaced by 6,000 Austrians. On 24 January 1737 Francis received Tuscany from his father-in-law. On 9 July 1737, Grand Duke Gian Gastone de' Medici died and Francis assumed the title of Grand Duke of Tuscany.

On 13 September 1745, Francis was elected Holy Roman Emperor. In summer of 1753, Emperor Francis I ordered the Tuscan government to reform the Duchy's military and form a regular cavalry regiment. On 13 September 1753, the Tuscan government ordered to begin with the formation of a regiment of dragoons. In October of the same year the Tuscan government informed Francis I that due to a lack of funds the Corps of Dragoons (Italian: Corpo dei Dragoni) consisted only of a staff of 32 men. In 1758, the Tuscan government finally provided the funds to form the regiment, which consisted of a staff, eight companies of dragoons, and one company of grenadiers-dragoons. The staff, which consisted of 10 men, and five dragoon companies were based in Pisa, while the other three dragoon companies were based in Livorno. The grenadiers-dragoons company was based in Poggio a Caiano near Florence, where the company acted as guard company. Each of the companies was supposed to field 56 men, with the regiment's strength intended to be 514 men. However one year later due to the fiscal situation of the Tuscan government, the regiment consisted of only 318 men.

In 1763, the regiment was reduced to 296 men and consisted then of a staff, five dragoon companies and one grenadiers-dragoons company. In 1764, the regiment was again reduced and then consisted of 234 men in dragoon three companies, which were all based in Pisa. On 18 August 1765, Emperor Francis I died and his son Leopold became the new Grand Duke of Tuscany. In 1767, Grand Duke Leopold, which unlike his father ruled the Tuscany from Florence, reduced the Tuscan military and the Corps of Dragoons was reduced to of 101 men and consisted then of a single squadron of two companies. In 1774, the unit was renamed His Royal Highness' Chevau-légers Squadron (Italian: Squadrone di Cavalleggeri di Sua Altezza Reale). In 1776, the squadron was reduced to 71 men and renamed Chevau-légers Company.

=== Napoleonic Wars ===
On 20 February 1790, Holy Roman Emperor Joseph II died and Grand Duke Leopold succeeded him. In spring of the same year, with the ideas of the French Revolution spreading across Europe, Leopold ordered to expand the Chevau-légers Company to a dragoons regiment of 200 mounted and 100 dismounted dragoons. On 22 July 1790, Leopold ceded the title of Grand Duke of Tuscany to this son Ferdinand, who ascended as Ferdinand III. Over summer the new Dragoons Regiment was formed, with 20 mounted and 30 dismounted dragoons based in Florence, 50 mounted and 20 dismounted dragoons based in Livorno, and the remaining 130 mounted and 50 dismounted dragoons based in Pisa. The regiment consisted of a staff and two companies, each of which fielded 98 mounted and 48 dismounted dragoons, while the regiment's staff consisted of 8 men.

By 1798, the regiment was fully mounted and consisted of 288 dragoons in five companies. In 1799, the regiment fought in the War of the Second Coalition against French troops and the troops of the French-allied Cisalpine Republic. On 14 June 1800, Napoleon Bonaparte defeated the Austrians in the Battle of Marengo and French forces occupied Tuscany and disbanded the Tuscan military. Grand Duke Ferdinand III fled to Vienna and on 21 March 1801 was forced by the Treaty of Aranjuez to exchange Tuscany for the Electorate of Salzburg and Berchtesgaden Provostry. On week later, on 28 March 1801, the French Republic and the Kingdom of Naples signed the Treaty of Florence, which transferred the Principality of Piombino and State of the Presidi in southern Tuscany to France. The French then combined the Grand Duchy of Tuscany, the Principality of Piombino and parts of Presidi in the Kingdom of Etruria, which was given to Louis I of Etruria as compensation for his father Ferdinand I, Duke of Parma being forced to cede his Duchy to the French.

On 27 May 1803, King Louis I died and was succeeded by his infant son, Charles Louis, under the regency of his mother, Queen María Luisa, who, on 21 July 1803, ordered to form a Royal Corps of Dragoons. The corps consisted of four companies in two squadrons. The four companies were based in Florence, Siena, Pistoia, and Livorno. On 21 July 1805, Queen María Luisa reduced the corps to the Tuscan Dragoons Squadron, which consisted of two companies.

On 10 December 1807, Emperor Napoleon forced Queen María Luisa to abdicate and the Kingdom of Etruria came under direct French control. On 7 January 1808, the new authorities ordered to expand the Tuscan Dragoons Squadron to a Tuscan Dragoons Regiment with two squadrons. On 29 May 1808, the formation of the regiment concluded, but already on the next day, 30 May 1808, the Kingdom of Etruria was annexed by the First French Empire and the regiment was integrated into the French Imperial Army.

In 1808, the regiment served in Napoleon's invasion of Spain. On 1 July 1809, the regiment was renamed 28^{e} Régiment de Chasseurs à Cheval. In 1811, the regiment fought in the Battle of Fuentes de Oñoro. In 1812, the regiment left Spain and in participated the invasion of Russia, during which it fought in the battles of Smolensk, Borodino, Vyazma, Krasnoi, and Berezina. In 1813-14, the regiment participated in the German campaign, during which it fought in the Battle of the Göhrde and the Siege of Hamburg. On 11 April 1814, Napoleon abdicated the throne and shortly thereafter the 28^{e} Régiment de Chasseurs à Cheval was disbanded.

=== Restoration ===
In 1814, the Grand Duchy of Tuscany was restored and Grand Duke Ferdinand III resumed his rule. The same year the corps was reformed as Royal Corps of Dragoons. On 21 January 1816, the corps was transferred to the light cavalry and renamed Corps of Mounted Hunters (Italian: Corpo dei Cacciatori a Cavallo), which consisted of four squadrons. On 18 June 1824 Ferdinand III died and was succeeded by his son Leopold II as Grand Duke. By 1836, the corps consisted of 300 troops.

=== Italian Wars of Independence ===
==== First Italian War of Independence ====
In 1848-49, the First Italian War of Independence between the Kingdom of Sardinia and the Austrian Empire was fought in northern Italy. Under popular pressure Grand Duke Leopold II sided with Sardinia and on 21 March 1848 joined the war. Leopold II sent a Tuscan Army contingent, which included two squadrons of the Corps of Mounted Hunters, to Veneto for the war's first campaign. On 29 May 1848, the Tuscan forces fought in the Battle of Curtatone and Montanara and the next day, 30 May 1848, in the Battle of Goito. On 9 August 1848, Sardinia and Austria signed the Armistice of Salasco, which concluded the first campaign of the war. The same month, the Corps of Mounted Hunters was armed with lances and dressed in Sardinian uniforms. Over the next months the situation in Tuscany deteriorated and on 30 January 1849, Leopold II fled with his family from Florence to Siena. On 7 February 1849, Leopold II left Siena and travelled to Porto Santo Stefano, where he and his family boarded a ship of the British Royal Navy. On 9 February 1849, Francesco Domenico Guerrazzi, Giuseppe Montanelli, and Giuseppe Mazzoni formed a triumvirate in Florence. The three triumvirs rewrote the Tuscan constitution and on 15 February proclaimed the Tuscan Republic.

Meanwhile Grand Duke Leopold II and King Charles Albert of Sardinia agreed to squash the Tuscan Republic. Sardinian troops under the command of General Alfonso Ferrero La Marmora and the Tuscan Army contingent under the command of General Cesare De Laugier were ordered to march from Sarzana to Florence and squash the Tuscan Republic. On 17 February 1849, De Laugier moved his forces to Massa in Tuscany, but the Austrian Field Marshal Joseph Radetzky threatened to resume the war against Sardinia if Sardinian forces joined De Laugier and consequently La Marmora remained at Sarzana. Soon afterwards De Laugier's troops refused to fire on Tuscan volunteers blocking the way and De Laugier was forced to flee back to Sarzana. On 21 February 1849, the Royal Navy ship sailed to Gaeta, where also Pope Pius IX had sought refugee after the proclamation of the Roman Republic in Rome.

On 1 March 1849, the Sardinian Chamber of Deputies voted for the resumption of the war at noon on 20 March 1849. Three days later, on 23 March 1849, Sardinian was decisively defeated in the Battle of Novara and Charles Albert of Sardinia abdicated in favor of his son Victor Emmanuel. After the news of the defeat at Novara reached Florence, the city's council organized a counter revolution and arrested Guerrazzi. On 12 April 1849, Florence's city council disbanded the Tuscan Republic and sent a delegation to Gaeta to invite Grand Duke Leopold II to return. Leopold had already asked the Austrians to intervene on his behalf and on 5 May 1849, the Austrian II Army Corps under Field Marshal Konstantin d’Aspre invaded Tuscany. On 10 May, the 18,000 Austrian troops began the Siege of Livorno, which Austrian troops stormed the next day. Once in control of the city d’Aspre had 317 rebels shot.

On 28 July 1849, Grand Duke Leopold II returned to Florence and resumed his rule. On 27 April 1850, Leopold II was forced to sign a military convention with Austria that allowed the Austrians to maintain a corps of 10,000 troops in Tuscany. On 13 May 1852, the corps was reduced to a division of two squadrons, which fielded 260 troops and 234 horses. In spring 1855, the last Austrian troops left Tuscany.

==== Second Italian War of Independence ====
On 21 July 1858, French Emperor Napoleon III and the Prime Minister of Sardinia Camillo Benso, Count of Cavour met in Plombières and reached a secret verbal agreement on a military alliance between the French Empire and the Kingdom of Sardinia against the Austrian Empire. On 26 January 1859, Napoleon III signed the Franco-Sardinian Treaty, followed by King Victor Emmanuel II on 29 January 1859. On 9 March 1859, Sardinia mobilized its army, followed by Austria on 9 April. On 23 April, Austria delivered an ultimatum to Sardinia demanding its demobilization. Upon Sardinia's refusal, Austria declared war on 26 April and three days later the Austrians crossed the Ticino river into Piedmont. Consequently, France honored its alliance with Sardinia and declared war on Austria on 3 May 1859.

On 27 April 1859, Grand Duke Leopold II refused popular demands to join the war against Austria, which led to an uprising in Florence. As the Tuscan Army sided with the people, Leopold II fled the same day to the Austrian garrison in Bologna in the Papal Legations of the Romagne. The evening of the same day, 27 April 1859, the city council of Florence formed the Provisional Government of Tuscany, which was led by Ubaldino Peruzzi, Vincenzo Malenchini, and Alessandro Danzini. The next day Victor Emmanuel II nominated the Sardinian ambassador in Florence Carlo Bon Compagni di Mombello as new head of state of the Grand Duchy.

On 10 May 1859, the Division of Mounted Hunters was expanded to four squadrons and renamed Tuscan Dragoons Division (Italian: Divisione Dragoni Toscani). On 23 May 1859, the 5th French Corps landed in Livorno and on 29 May the Grand Duchy of Tuscany joined the Franco-Sardinian alliance against Austria. During the war the division's 1st and 4th squadrons were attached to the Royal Sardinian Army, while the 2nd and 3rd squadrons were sent to garrison Bologna. On 12 July 1859, the Second Italian War of Independence ended with the Armistice of Villafranca, which called for the rulers of the Grand Duchy of Tuscany, the Duchy of Modena and Reggio, and the Duchy of Parma and Piacenza, which all had fled their nations, to be restored to their thrones. However neither Sardinia nor the Sardinian installed governments in the three nations wished for a return of the rulers. On 23 July 1859, the Tuscan National Assembly ordered to form a Tuscan Chevau-légers Division (Italian: Divisione Cavalleggeri Toscani). On 14 November 1859, the Tuscan Chevau-légers Division was renamed Regiment "Cavalleggeri di Lucca", while the Tuscan Dragoons Division was renamed Regiment "Cavalleggeri di Firenze".

On 8 December 1859 the Grand Duchy of Tuscany, Duchy of Parma, Duchy of Modena and the Papal Legations were merged into the United Provinces of Central Italy. On 11 and 12 March 1860, the Royal Provinces of Emilia and the Grand Duchy of Tuscany voted in a plebiscite for annexation by the Kingdom of Sardinia. On 18 March 1860, the annexation act was presented to King Victor Emmanuel II and one week later, on 25 March 1860, the Regiment "Cavalleggeri di Firenze" and Regiment "Cavalleggeri di Lucca" were incorporated into the Royal Sardinian Army. The Regiment "Cavalleggeri di Firenze" was the only regiment of a pre-unification Italian state allowed to retain its regimental honors and traditions upon entering the Royal Sardinian Army, although the regiment's place in the Sardinian cavalry's order of precedence was determined by the regiment's date of incorporation into the Royal Sardinian Army. The regiment's troops were armed with lance, sabre and pistolone — a pistol with a shoulder stock. On 6 June of the same year, the Sardinian War Ministry ordered that the army's cavalry regiments, which were equipped with lances — with the exception of the four line cavalry regiments — were to join the new Lancers speciality. Consequently, on the same day, the Regiment "Cavalleggeri di Firenze" was renamed Regiment "Lancieri di Firenze".

On 16 February 1864, the regiment ceded its 5th Squadron to help form the Regiment "Lancieri di Foggia".

==== Third Italian War of Independence ====
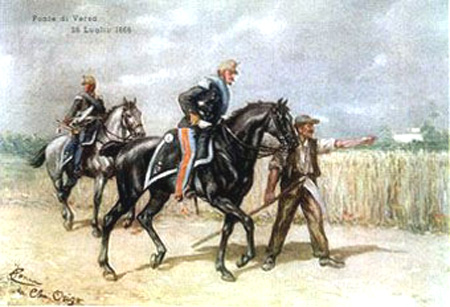
The Regiment "Lancieri di Firenze" on the way to Versa in 1866.

On 20 June 1866, the Third Italian War of Independence between the Kingdom of Italy and the Austrian Empire began. During the war the Regiment "Lancieri di Firenze" formed, together with the Regiment "Lancieri Vittorio Emanuele" and Regiment "Cavalleggeri di Monferrato", the II Cavalry Brigade of the IV Corps of the Army of the Po, which operated along the Po river. On 5 July 1866, the Army of the Po began the siege of the Austrian fortress at Borgoforte and during the night between 6 and 7 July the army crossed the Po river. On 11 July, the first forces of the Army of the Po entered Rovigo, which had been abandoned by the Austrians, as the Austrian forces in Italy had received the order to retreat towards the Isonzo river and the Trentino region. On 14 July, the Italian IV Corps ceded five divisions and the Italian I Corps one division to form the V Corps and VI Corps. Additionally the Italian II Corps and III Corps ceded both one division to form the VIII Corps. Afterwards the Army of the Po, which now consisted of the I, IV, V, VI, and VIII corps with a combined force of 14 divisions and six cavalry brigades, began a rapid advance through Veneto towards the Isonzo river without encountering Austrian forces. Together with the X, XVI, XXII, and XXXV Bersaglieri battalions, the Regiment "Lancieri di Firenze" formed the vanguard of the Italian forces. On 26 July 1866, the regiment and Bersaglieri battalions arrived at the bridge over the Torre river at Versa, which was defended by Austrian forces. In the following Battle of Versa the Italian units forced the Austrians to retreat, crossed the river and established a bridgehead around the villagio Versa. Versa remained the furthest point of the Italian advance, as the Armistice of Cormons between Italy and Austria established the Torre river as the new border. For its conduct at Versa the Regiment "Lancieri di Firenze" was awarded a Bronze Medal of Military Valor, which was affixed to the regiment's standard.

In 1868-69, the regiment operated in southern Italy to suppress the anti-Sardinian revolt, which had erupted after the Kingdom of Sardinia had annexed the Kingdom of the Two Sicilies. During this time the regiment operated initially in the Abruzzo region and then the Molise region. On 10 September 1871, the regiment was renamed 9th Cavalry Regiment (Firenze), and on 5 November 1876, Cavalry Regiment "Firenze" (9th). In 1887, the regiment provided personnel and horses for the formation of the Mounted Hunters Squadron, which fought in the Italo-Ethiopian War of 1887–1889. In 1895-96, the regiment provided two officers and 70 enlisted for units deployed to Italian Eritrea for the First Italo-Ethiopian War. On 16 December 1897, the regiment was renamed Regiment "Lancieri di Firenze" (9th). On 1 October 1909, the regiment ceded its 3rd Squadron to help form the Regiment "Lancieri di Mantova" (25th).

On 29 September 1911, the Kingdom of Italy declared war against the Ottoman Empire, which started the Italo-Turkish War. The Regiment "Lancieri di Firenze" (9th) was transferred to Tripoli in Libya, where it fought in December 1911 in the first Italian attempt to occupy the oasis of Zanzur. On 8 June 1912, the regiment fought in the second Italian advance to Zanzur.

=== World War I ===
At the outbreak of World War I the regiment consisted of a command, a depot, and two cavalry groups, with the I Group consisting of three squadrons and the II Group consisting of two squadrons and a machine gun section. On 24 May 1915, the day Italy entered the war, the regiment was assigned to the IX Army Corps. Unlike the cavalry regiments, which were assigned to the army's 1st and 4th cavalry divisions, the Regiment "Lancieri di Firenze" (9th) was not dismounted for the war and remained with the Royal Italian Army's reserve. In 1917, the regiment's depot in Rome formed the 1498th Dismounted Machine Gunners Company as reinforcement for the regiment.

On 24 October 1917, the Imperial German Army and Austro-Hungarian Army began the Battle of Caporetto and already on the first day of the battle the German 14th Army broke through the Italian lines at Kobarid. All mounted Italian cavalry regiments were sent forward to cover the retreat of the Italian 2nd Army and 3rd Army from the Isonzo front. Initially the Regiment "Lancieri di Firenze" (9th) defended the right bank of the Tagliamento river, before falling back to the bridge over the Livenza river at Portobuffolé, where the regiment on 6 and 7 November 1917 defeated repeated Austro-Hungarian attempts to cross the river. The regiment then retreated to the right bank of the Monticano river and on 9 November the regiment fell back to the new Italian line along the Piave river.

On 15 June 1918, the Austro-Hungarian Army began the Second Battle of the Piave River, during which Austro-Hungarian forces crossed the Piave river. By evening of the same day Austro-Hungarian vanguards occupied the village of Giavera at the foot of the heavily contested Montello hill. The command of the Regiment "Lancieri di Firenze" (9th) ordered a charge and before nightfall the village was retaken. On 24 October 1918, the Royal Italian Army began the Battle of Vittorio Veneto and on 30 October, the Regiment "Lancieri di Firenze" (9th) occupied the city of Vittorio, which led to the collapse of the Austro-Hungarian front. The next day the regiment, like all Italian cavalry regiments, was ordered to pursue the retreating Austro-Hungarian armies. On 4 November 1918, the regiment arrived in Longarone, where it was informed of the Armistice of Villa Giusti.

For its conduct at Portobuffolé during the Battle of Caporetto and at Giavera during the Second Battle of the Piave River, and the liberation of Vittorio Veneto the Regiment "Lancieri di Firenze" (9th) was awarded a Bronze Medal of Military Valor, which was affixed to the regiment's standard.

=== Interwar years ===
After the war the Royal Italian Army disbanded the second groups of all thirty cavalry regiments, while the first groups were reduced to two squadrons. On 21 November 1919, 14 cavalry regiments were disbanded and their groups transferred to 14 of the remaining cavalry regiments. One of the disbanded regiments was the Regiment "Cavalleggeri di Palermo" (30th), whose remaining group was renamed II Squadrons Group "Cavalleggeri di Palermo". Afterwards, the squadrons group, which was still in Albania was assigned to the Regiment "Lancieri di Firenze" (9th). In February 1920, the II Squadrons Group "Cavalleggeri di Palermo", which retained the disbanded regiment's standard, returned to its base in Palermo.

On 20 May 1920, the Royal Italian Army disbanded five additional cavalry regiments, among them the Regiment "Cavalleggeri di Lodi" (15th), whose I Squadrons Group was assigned to the Regiment "Lancieri di Firenze" (9th), which on the same date retired its lances and was renamed Regiment "Cavalleggeri di Firenze". Furthermore on the same day, the Regiment "Cavalleggeri di Firenze" transferred one of its squadrons to the Regiment "Piemonte Reale Cavalleria" (2nd) and then moved from Rome to Naples, where it took over the barracks of the disbanded Regiment "Cavalleggeri di Lodi" (15th). On 1 July 1920, the traditions and standards of the Regiment "Cavalleggeri di Lodi" (15th), the Regiment "Cavalleggeri di Udine" (29th), and the Regiment "Cavalleggeri di Palermo" (30th), as well as the traditions of the X Sardinian Group, were entrusted to the Regiment "Cavalleggeri di Firenze". On 24 May 1925, the standards of the three disbanded regiments were transferred to the Shrine of the Flags, which at the time was located in Castel Sant'Angelo, for safekeeping.

In 1925, the regiment moved from Naples to Ferrara. On 8 February 1934, the regiment was renamed Regiment "Lancieri di Firenze". On 1 January 1935, the regiment was assigned, together with the Regiment "Lancieri di Novara" and Regiment "Lancieri Vittorio Emanuele II", to the 2nd Cavalry Division. In 1935-36, the regiment provided one officer and 540 enlisted for units deployed to East Africa for the Second Italo-Ethiopian War.

=== World War II ===
At the outbreak of World War II the regiment was assigned to the 2nd Cavalry Division "Emanuele Filiberto Testa di Ferro" and consisted of a command, a command squadron, the 5th Machine Gunners Squadron, and the I and II squadrons groups, which both consisted of two mounted squadrons. The regiment fielded 37 officers, 37 non-commissioned officers, 798 enlisted troops and 818 horses. The regiment was equipped with one car, six motorcycles, 16 trucks, 36 Breda mod. 30 light machine guns, and 12 Fiat mod. 35 heavy machine guns. In April 1941, the 2nd Cavalry Division "Emanuele Filiberto Testa di Ferro" fought in the invasion of Yugoslavia. Afterwards, the regiment was sent to Croatia and then Kosovo on anti-partisan duty. In December 1940, the regiment returned to its barracks in Ferrara.

During the year 1940, the regiment's depot in Ferrara formed the III Road Movement Battalion "Lancieri di Firenze", VII Dismounted Group "Lancieri di Firenze", and LVI Dismounted Group "Lancieri di Firenze", followed in 1941 by the III Armored Group "Lancieri di Firenze". On 10 March 1942, the Regiment "Lancieri di Firenze" left the 2nd Cavalry Division "Emanuele Filiberto Testa di Ferro" and was replaced by the Regiment "Piemonte Reale Cavalleria". The Regiment "Lancieri di Firenze" then moved to annexed Albania, where it continued to serve in the anti-partisan role. On 15 July 1942 the Firenze's depot in Ferrara formed the Armored Reconnaissance Grouping "Lancieri di Montebello".

On 12 June 1943, the regiment's commanding officer Colonel Ludovico de Bartolomeis was killed during a charge against Albanian partisans. In the evening of 8 September 1943, the Armistice of Cassibile, which ended hostilities between the Kingdom of Italy and the Anglo-American Allies, was announced by General Dwight D. Eisenhower on Radio Algiers and by Marshal Pietro Badoglio on Italian radio. Germany reacted by invading Italy and the Italian occupied territories. The announcement of the armistice reached the Regiment "Lancieri di Firenze" in the area of Tirana. Within a few days, the overwhelming number of invading German forces, compelled the regiment's officers to hide the regiment's standard and then dissolve the regiment.

=== Cold War ===
On 21 June 1951, the Italian Army formed the Armored Cavalry Squadron "Lancieri di Firenze" in Rome, which received the name and traditions of the regiment. The squadron was equipped with M8 Greyhound armored cars and assigned to Armored Division "Pozzuolo del Friuli" as the division's reconnaissance unit. In 1955, the squadron moved from Rome to Civitavecchia. On 1 October 1956, the squadron was expanded to Squadrons Group "Lancieri di Firenze". On 31 December 1957, the squadrons group was disbanded.

During the 1975 army reform the army disbanded the regimental level and newly independent battalions were granted for the first time their own flags, respectively in the case of cavalry units, their own standard. On 30 September 1975, the Regiment "Piemonte Cavalleria" (2nd) was disbanded and the next day, on 1 October 1975, the regiment's II Squadrons Group in Sgonico became an autonomous unit and was renamed 9th Tank Squadrons Group "Lancieri di Firenze". The squadrons group was assigned to the Armored Brigade "Vittorio Veneto" and consisted of a command, a command and services squadron, and three tank squadrons equipped with Leopard 1A2 main battle tanks. At the time the squadrons group fielded 434 men (32 officers, 82 non-commissioned officers, and 320 soldiers).

On 12 November 1976, the President of the Italian Republic Giovanni Leone assigned with decree 846 the standard and traditions of the Regiment "Lancieri di Firenze" (9th) to the squadrons group.

For its conduct and work after the 1976 Friuli earthquake the squadrons group was awarded a Bronze Medal of Army Valor, which was affixed to the squadrons group's standard and added to its coat of arms.

In 1986, the squadrons group was reorganized as 9th Mechanized Squadrons Group "Lancieri di Firenze" and now consisted of a command, a command and services squadron, three mechanized squadrons with M113 armored personnel carriers, and a heavy mortar squadron with M106 mortar carriers with 120mm mod. 63 mortars.

=== Recent times ===
After the end of the Cold War the Italian Army began to draw down its forces and the Mechanized Brigade "Vittorio Veneto" was one of the first brigades to disband. On 31 July 1991, the brigade and most of its units were disbanded, while the 9th Mechanized Squadrons Group "Lancieri di Firenze" was transferred to the 3rd Army Corps. In 1992, the squadrons group moved from Sgonico to Grosseto in Tuscany, where it joined the Mechanized Brigade "Friuli". On 10 September 1992, the 9th Mechanized Squadrons Group "Lancieri di Firenze" lost its autonomy and the next day the squadrons group entered the reformed Regiment "Lancieri di Firenze" (9th). On the same day, the standard and traditions of the Regiment "Lancieri di Firenze" (9th) were transferred from the squadrons group to the regiment. The regiment consisted of a command, a command and services squadron, and a squadrons group with three squadrons with wheeled Centauro tank destroyers.

From 1 October 1993 to 19 January 1994, the regiment participated with one squadron in the United Nations Operation in Somalia II. On 6 October 1995, the Regiment "Savoia Cavalleria" (3rd) disbanded its squadrons in Meran and the next day, on 7 October 1995, the standard of the Regiment "Savoia Cavalleria" (3rd) arrived in Grosseto, where it replaced the standard of the Regiment "Lancieri di Firenze" (9th) and took over the latter regiment's base, squadrons, and personnel. Two days later, on 9 October 1995, the standard of the Regiment "Lancieri di Firenze" (9th) was transferred to the Shrine of the Flags in the Vittoriano in Rome for safekeeping.

== See also ==
- Cavalry Brigade "Pozzuolo del Friuli"
