= 2nd Cavalry Division "Emanuele Filiberto Testa di Ferro" =

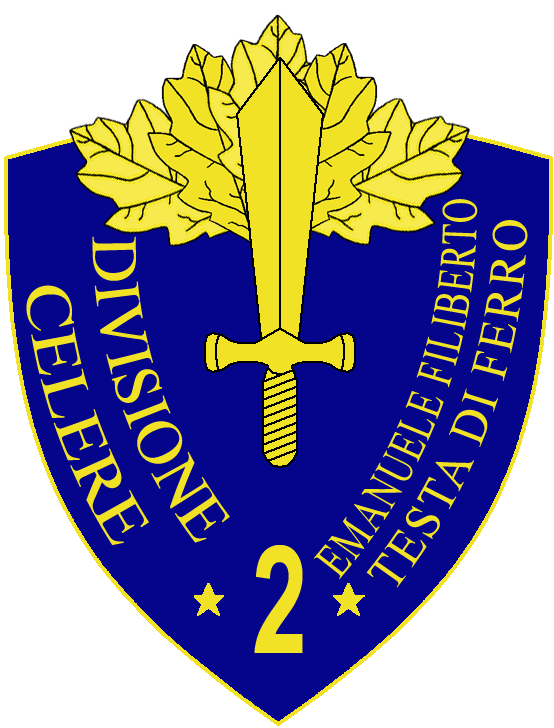
- 2nd Cavalry Division "Emanuele Filiberto Testa di Ferro" insignia
- Active: 1930-1943
- Country: Kingdom of Italy
- Branch: Royal Italian Army
- Type: Cavalry
- Size: Division
- Garrison/HQ: Ferrara
- Engagements: World War II

Insignia
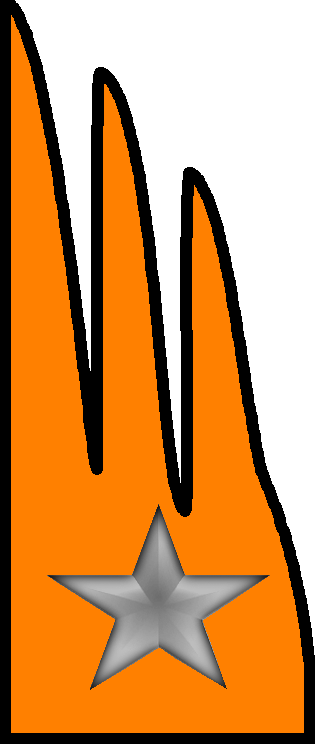
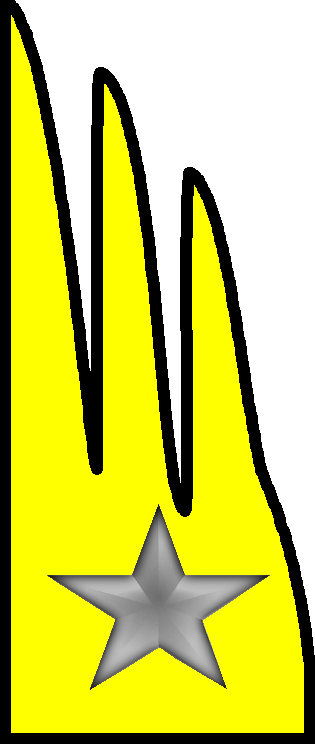
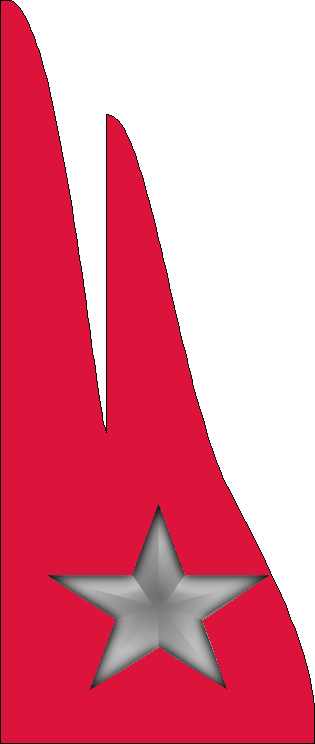
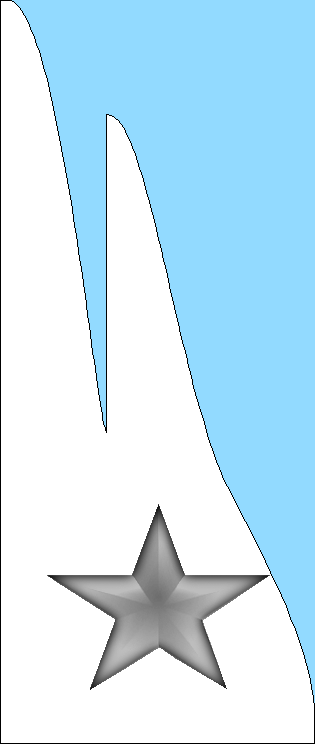
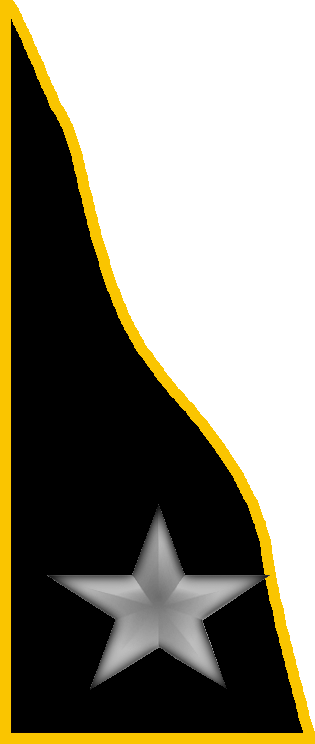
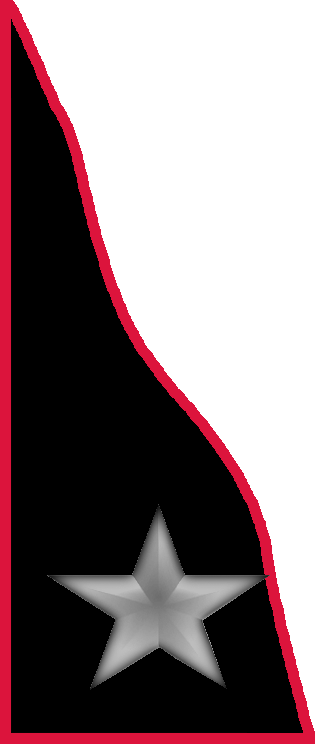
- Identification symbol: Emanuele Filiberto Testa di Ferro Division gorget patches

The 2nd Cavalry Division "Emanuele Filiberto Testa di Ferro" (Italian: 2ª Divisione celere "Emanuele Filiberto Testa di Ferro") was a cavalry or "Celere" (Fast) division of the Royal Italian Army during World War II. The division was mobilised in 1940. It did not take part in the Italian invasion of France, but did serve in the Invasion of Yugoslavia and remained in Yugoslavia as part of the occupying forces. In March 1942 the division's 6th Bersaglieri Regiment was sent to the Soviet Union attached to the 3rd Cavalry Division "Principe Amedeo Duca d'Aosta". In May 1942 the division started converting to an armored division, however, the conversion was cancelled and it returned to the cavalry format. In December 1942, the division moved to France as part of the Italian occupying forces where it was based in Toulon. The division remained in France until the Armistice of Cassibile was announced on 8 September 1943 and was then disbanded by the invading Germans.

== History ==
The division was formed on 17 April 1930 as 2nd Fast Division in the city of Bologna. Although not officially sanctioned the division is considered to be the heir of the 2nd Cavalry Division of Veneto, which fought in World War I and consisted of the III and IV cavalry brigades. On 15 June 1930 the II Cavalry Brigade, with the regiments Regiment "Genova Cavalleria", Regiment "Cavalleggeri di Aosta", and Regiment "Cavalleggeri Guide" entered the division. On 1 October 1934 the 2nd Artillery Regiment for Cavalry Division was formed and assigned to the division.

On 1 January 1935 the division and brigade received the name "Emanuele Filiberto Testa di Ferro". On the same date the brigade was reorganized and consisted now of the cavalry regiments Regiment "Lancieri di Novara", Regiment "Lancieri di Firenze", and Regiment "Lancieri Vittorio Emanuele II", the 6th Bersaglieri Regiment, the 2nd Fast Artillery Regiment "Emanuele Filiberto Testa di Ferro", and II Light Tank Group "San Marco". In November of the same year the "Lancieri di Novara" left the division for the newly raised 3rd Cavalry Division "Principe Amedeo Duca d'Aosta". On 1 February 1938 the II Cavalry Brigade "Emanuele Filiberto Testa di Ferro" was dissolved and its units came under direct command of the division.

=== World War II ===
In March 1941 the division had to transfer its 2nd Fast Artillery Regiment "Emanuele Filiberto Testa di Ferro" with the II and III motorized groups to Libya, where it was assigned to the German 90th Light Infantry Division. The 2nd Cavalry Division participated in the Invasion of Yugoslavia and returned to its garrison in Bologna in July 1941. On 23 June the division lost its last artillery group, which was transferred to the 3rd Cavalry Division "Principe Amedeo Duca d'Aosta" to form a horse artillery regiment for the latter division's upcoming deployment to the Eastern front. On 20 January 1942 the division also had to cede the 6th Bersaglieri Regiment to the 3rd Cavalry Division "Principe Amedeo Duca d'Aosta", which had been bled dry in the Soviet Union. As replacement the division received the 1st Bersaglieri Regiment. On 10 March 1942, the Regiment "Lancieri di Firenze" left the division and was sent to Albania. As replacement the division received the Regiment "Piemonte Reale Cavalleria".

=== 134th Armored Division "Emanuele Filiberto Testa di Ferro" ===
On 1 May 1942, the 2nd Cavalry Division "Emanuele Filiberto Testa di Ferro" was renamed 134th Armored Division "Emanuele Filiberto Testa di Ferro". The division consisted of the Armored Regiment "Lancieri Vittorio Emanuele II", 1st Bersaglieri Regiment, 134th Motorized Artillery Regiment and XXXV Mixed Engineer Battalion. On 19 June 1942 the Regiment "Lancieri di Montebello" joined the division as its armored reconnaissance regiment. However already on 1 August of the same year the division returned to its old designation and lost the regiments "Lancieri di Montebello" and "Lancieri Vittorio Emanuele II". As replacements the division received the cavalry regiments Regiment "Nizza Cavalleria", Regiment "Piemonte Reale Cavalleria", and Regiment "Genova Cavalleria". The division returned to Yugoslavia in October 1942.

=== Case Anton ===
On 13 November 1942 the division moved to Southern France, which had been occupied by German forces three days earlier. The division initially garrisoned Nice, before assuming coastal defense duties between Antibes and Saint Tropez. In December the division moved further East and replaced the 58th Infantry Division "Legnano" along the coast from Antibes to Menton.

On 4 September 1943 the division was recalled to Italy in preparation for the Armistice of Cassibile and the expected German reaction. After the Armistice of Cassibile was announced on 8 September 1943 the division blocked German attempts to enter Turin on 9 September, and the next day moved towards the Val Maira and Val Varaita valleys in an attempt to keep the retreat route for the Italian units in Southern France open. With no orders from the King or government the division dissolved on 18 September in the area of Cuneo.

== Organization ==
2nd Cavalry Division "Emanuele Filiberto Testa di Ferro" organization in 1940

The division had undergone a level of mechanization and fielded two cavalry regiments, a Bersaglieri regiment, a motorized artillery regiment, and a light tank group. The squadrons of the cavalry regiments were horse-mounted and, other than a motorcycle company, the Bersaglieri were issued with bicycles. The light tank group had a total of 61 L3/35s and L6/40 tanks.

- 2nd Cavalry Division "Emanuele Filiberto Testa di Ferro", in Ferrara
  - Headquarters
    - Command Squadron
    - 240th Carabinieri Section
    - 352nd Carabinieri Section
    - 33rd Field Post Office
    - 2nd Cavalry Division Command Transport Squad
  - Regiment "Lancieri di Firenze", in Ferrara (replaced by the Regiment "Piemonte Reale Cavalleria" on 10 March 1942)
    - Command Squadron
    - I Squadrons Group
    - II Squadrons Group
    - 5th Machine Gun Squadron
  - Regiment "Lancieri Vittorio Emanuele II", in Bologna
    - Command Squadron
    - I Squadrons Group
    - II Squadrons Group
    - 5th Machine Gun Squadron
  - 6th Bersaglieri Regiment, in Bologna (transferred to the 3rd Cavalry Division "Principe Amedeo Duca d'Aosta" on 20 January 1942; replaced by the 1st Bersaglieri Regiment)
    - Command Company
    - VI Bersaglieri Battalion
    - XIII Bersaglieri Battalion
    - XIX Bersaglieri Battalion
    - 6th Bersaglieri Motorcyclists Company
    - 6th Cannons Company (47/32 mod. 35 anti-tank guns)
  - 2nd Fast Artillery Regiment "Emanuele Filiberto Testa di Ferro", in Ferrara (sent to North Africa in March 1941)
    - Command Unit
    - I Group (75/27 mod. 12 horse-drawn guns)
    - II Group (75/27 mod. 11 field guns)
    - III Group (75/27 mod. 11 field guns)
    - 1 × Anti-aircraft battery (20/65 mod. 35 anti-aircraft guns)
    - Ammunition and Supply Unit
  - 134th Motorized Artillery Regiment (formed on 1 December 1941 by the depot of the 8th Army Corps Artillery Regiment in Rome)
    - Command Unit
    - I Group (75/27 mod. 11 field guns)
    - II Group (75/27 mod. 11 field guns)
    - III Group (105/28 cannons)
  - II Light Tank Group "San Marco", in Casalecchio di Reno (L3/35 tankettes and L6/40 tanks)
  - 172nd Anti-tank Company (47/32 mod. 35 anti-tank guns; detached to the 3rd Cavalry Division "Principe Amedeo Duca d'Aosta" for the campaign in the Soviet Union)
  - 102nd Mixed Engineer Company (expanded in 1942 to XXXV Mixed Engineer Battalion)
  - 72nd Medical Section
    - 157th Field Hospital
    - 158th Field Hospital
    - 159th Field Hospital
    - 175th Field Hospital
    - 20th Surgical Unit
  - 92nd Supply Section
  - 212th Mixed Transport Unit
    - 35th Transport Section
    - 862nd Transport Section
    - 863rd Transport Section
    - 864th Transport Section

== Commanding officers ==
The division's commanding officers were:

- Generale di Divisione Aldo Aymonino
- Generale di Divisione Cesare Bonati
- Generale di Divisione Claudio Trezzani
- Generale di Brigata Gervasio Bitossi
- Generale di Divisione Lorenzo Dalmazzo (1 September 1938 - 16 August 1939)
- Generale di Brigata Furio Monticelli (17 August 1939 - 9 June 1940)
- Generale di Divisione Gavino Pizzolato (10 June 1940 - 17 February 1941)
- Generale di Brigata Carlo Ceriana-Mayneri (18 February 1941 - 17 July 1942)
- Generale di Brigata Enrico Kellner (acting, 18 July - 4 August 1942)
- Generale di Brigata Mario Badino Rossi (5 August 1942 - 17 July 1943)
- Generale di Brigata Giuseppe Andreoli (18 July 1943 - 18 September 1943)
