= Logistic Regiment "Sassari" =

Active Italian Army brigade logistics unit

- Reggimento Logistico "Sassari"
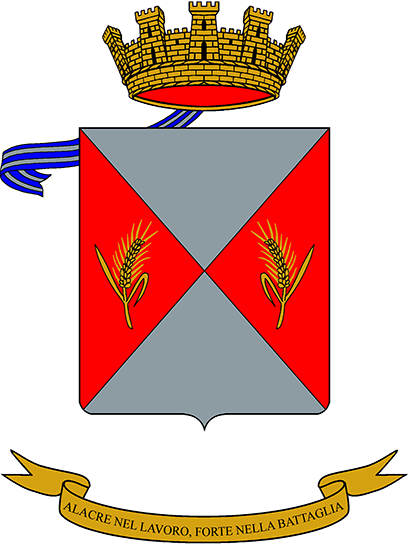
- Regimental coat of arms
- Active: 1 Nov. 2019 — today
- Country: Italy
- Branch: Italian Army
- Type: Military logistics
- Part of: Mechanized Brigade "Sassari"
- Garrison/HQ: Cagliari
- Mottos: "Alacre nel lavoro, forte nella battaglia"
- Anniversaries: 22 May 1916 - Battle of Asiago
- Decorations: 1× Silver Medal of Army Valor; 1× Silver Cross of Army Merit

Insignia
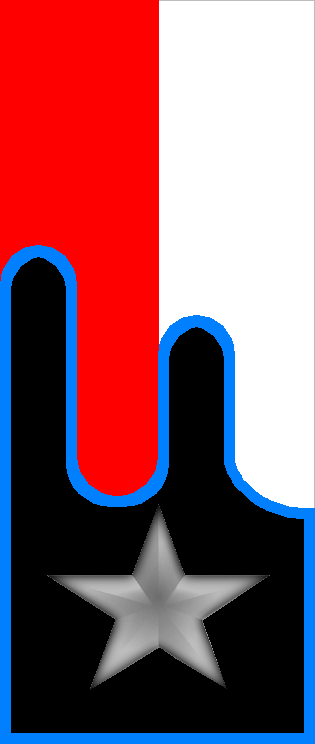
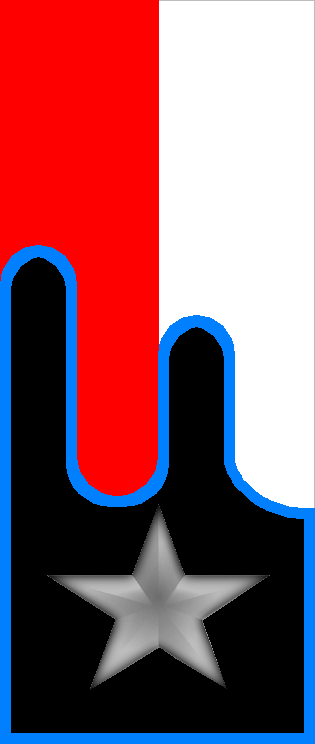
- Unit gorget patches

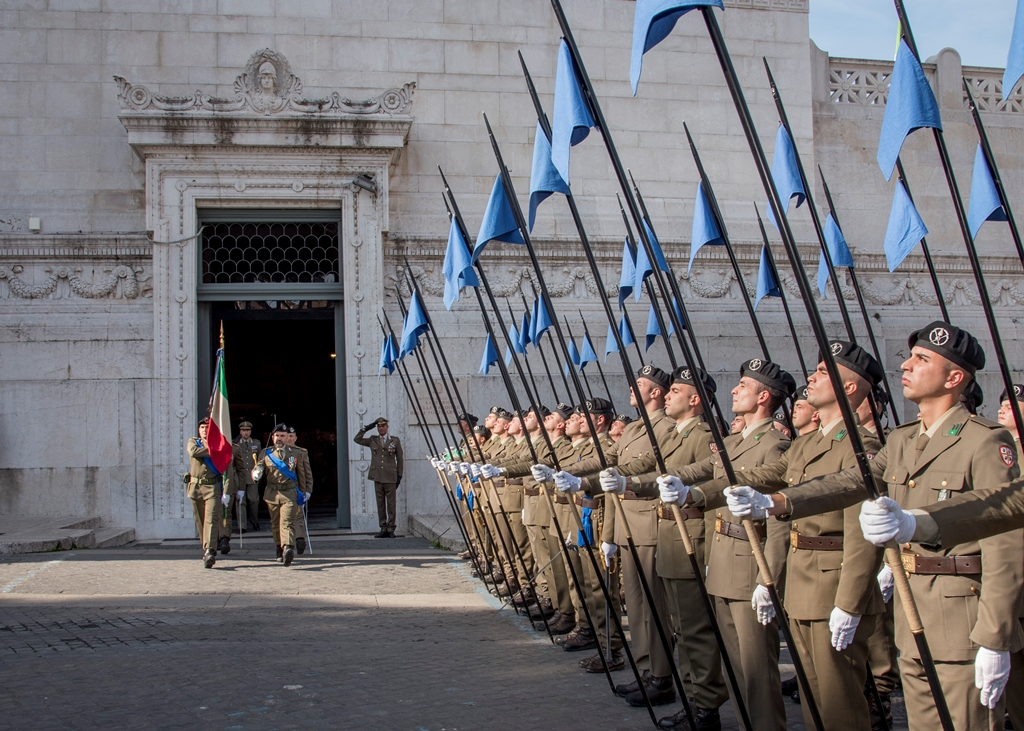
A Regiment "Lancieri di Montebello" (8th) honor guard salutes the flag of the Logistic Battalion "Cremona" as it leaves the Shrine of the Flags

The Logistic Regiment "Sassari" (Italian: Reggimento Logistico "Sassari") is a military logistics regiment of the Italian Army based in Cagliari in Sardinia. The regiment is the logistic unit of the Mechanized Brigade "Sassari" and was assigned the flag of the Logistic Battalion "Cremona", which was stationed in Sardinia during the World War II. The regiment's anniversary falls, as for all units of the Italian Army's Transport and Materiel Corps, on 22 May, the anniversary of the Royal Italian Army's first major use of automobiles to transport reinforcements to the Asiago plateau to counter the Austro-Hungarian Asiago Offensive in May 1916.

== History ==
The establishment of a logistic unit for the Mechanized Brigade "Sassari" began in March 2019. In June 2019, the Italian Parliament authorized the establishment of the logistic regiment.

On 1 November 2019, the regiment was declared operational and received the flag of the Logistic Battalion "Cremona". On 29 November 2019, the regiment's troops took their oath in front of the newly arrived the flag.

The Logistic Battalion "Cremona" is the spiritual successor of the logistic units of the 44th Infantry Division "Cremona", which since March 1941 was deployed to Sardinia. In fall 1942, the "Cremona" division was sent, together with the 20th Infantry Division "Friuli", to occupy the island of Corsica. In the evening of 8 September 1943, the Armistice of Cassibile, which ended hostilities between the Kingdom of Italy and the Anglo-American Allies, was announced by General Dwight D. Eisenhower on Radio Algiers and by Marshal Pietro Badoglio on Italian radio. The next day the "Friuli" division and "Cremona" division fought the German Sturmbrigade Reichsführer SS and 90th Panzergrenadier Division, which were retreating through Corsica to the harbour of Bastia in the island's North. The "Friuli" and "Cremona" divisions then moved to Sardinia and joined the Italian Co-belligerent Army. In fall 1944, the "Cremona" division was reorganized as Combat Group "Cremona", which fought on the allied side in the Italian campaign. On 30 April 1945, the Combat Group "Cremona" liberated Venice.

After World War II the combat group was renamed Infantry Division "Cremona" and moved to the city of Turin. As part of the 1975 army reform the "Cremona" division was reorganized as Motorized Brigade "Cremona" and on 30 October 1975, the division's services grouping command was reorganized as Logistic Battalion "Cremona", which received the traditions of all preceding logistic, transport, medical, maintenance, and supply units bearing the name "Cremona".

=== Recent times ===
On 5 November 1996, the Logistic Battalion "Cremona" was disbanded and the following 13 November the battalion's flag was transferred to the Shrine of the Flags in the Vittoriano in Rome for safekeeping. On 28 October 2019, the commander of the Logistic Regiment "Sassari" and the regiment's flag team retrieved the flag of the Logistic Battalion "Cremona" in the Vittoriano and transferred it to Sardinia, where the following 1 November, the flag was paraded in front of the assembled regiment, which then took officially possession of the flag.

On 21 May 2025, the regiment was awarded the Silver Medal of Army Valor for its conduct during its deployment to Lebanon as part of the United Nations Interim Force in Lebanon from August 2024 to February 2025, which coincided with the Hezbollah–Israel conflict that had started in October 2023.

== Organization ==
As of 2024 the Logistic Regiment "Sassari" is organized as follows:

- Logistic Regiment "Sassari", in Cagliari
  - Command and Logistic Support Company
  - Logistic Battalion
    - Transport Company
    - Maintenance Company
    - Supply Company

== See also ==
- Military logistics
