= Santi Gervasio e Protasio =

Santi Gervasio e Protasio may refer to:

- Gervasius and Protasius, 2nd-century Italian Christian martyrs

== Churches ==
- Santi Gervasio e Protasio, Budrio
- Santi Gervasio e Protasio, Mantua
- Santi Gervasio e Protasio, None
- Santi Gervasio e Protasio, Pavia
- Santi Gervasio e Protasio, Sondrio
