= Santi Gervasio e Protasio, Mantua =

Church building in Mantua, Italy

Santi Gervasio e Protasio
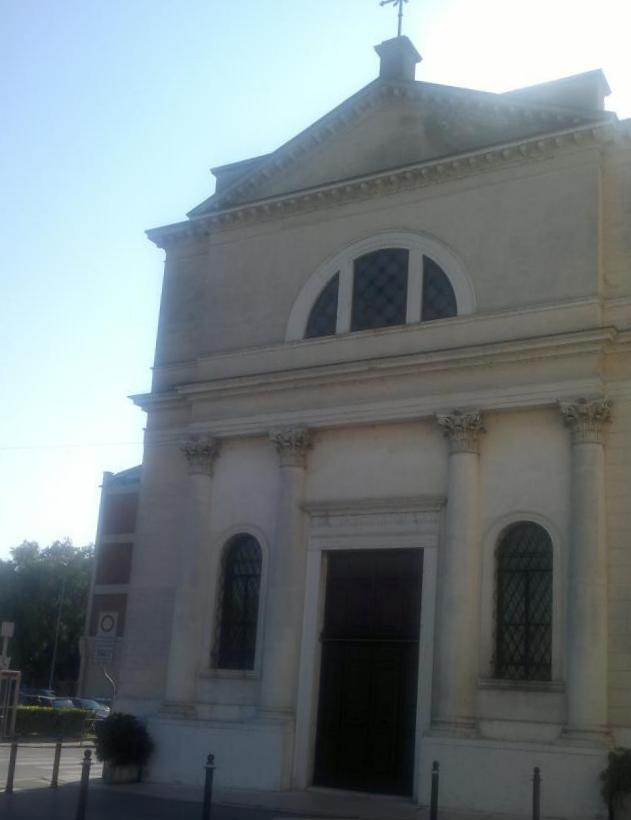

Religion
- Affiliation: Roman Catholic

Location
- Location: Mantua, Italy
- Interactive map of Santi Gervasio e Protasio
- Coordinates: 45°09′50″N 10°47′21″E

Architecture
- Type: Church

Santi Gervasio e Protasio is a Roman Catholic church located in Mantua, region of Lombardy, Italy.

== History ==
A church at the site was apparently erected in the 14th century by the Donesmondi family. Prior to becoming a parish church in the 17th century, it served as chapel for the town Leper hospital. The present facade derives from the reconstruction in 1836 in a neoclassical-style by the architect Giovanni Battista Vergani. During the second world war, the church was heavily damaged by bombardments of the nearby Ponte dei Mulini.

The interior contains altarpieces by Ippolito Costa, depicting a Deposition, and by Giovanni Canti depicting Saints Charles Borromeo, John the Baptist, and Antony of Padua.
