= Logistic Battalion "Cremona" =

Inactive Italian Army brigade logistics unit

- Battaglione Logistico "Cremona"
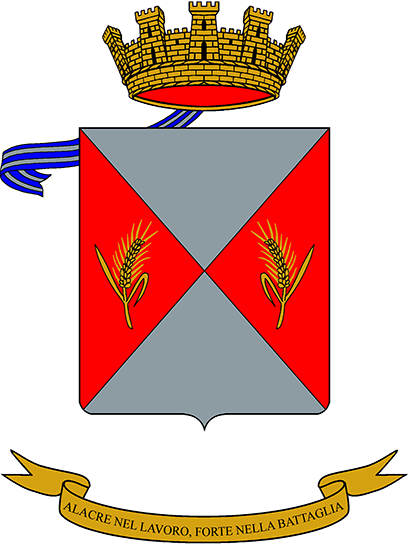
- Battalion coat of arms
- Active: 30 Oct. 1975 — 5 Nov. 1996
- Country: Italy
- Branch: Italian Army
- Type: Military logistics
- Part of: Motorized Brigade "Cremona"
- Garrison/HQ: Venaria Reale
- Motto(s): "Alacre nel lavoro, forte nella battaglia"
- Anniversaries: 22 May 1916 - Battle of Asiago

Insignia
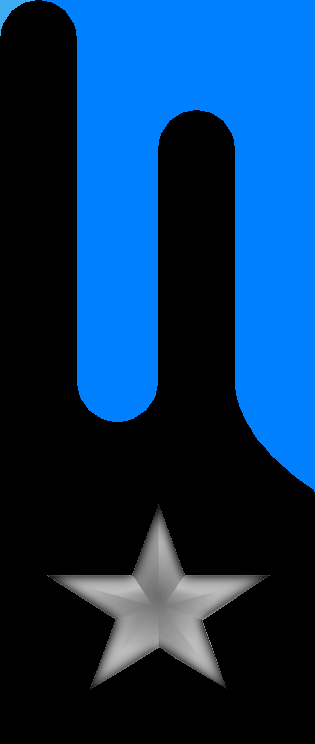
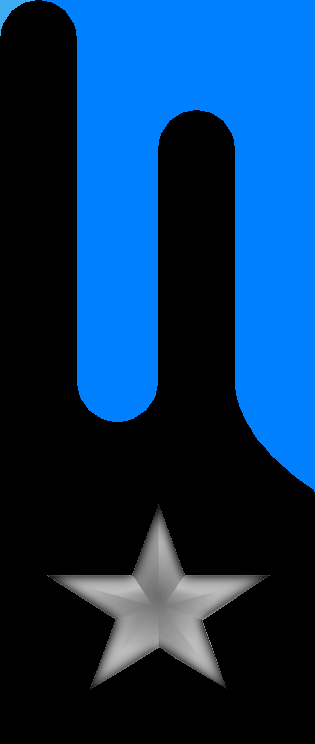
- Unit gorget patches

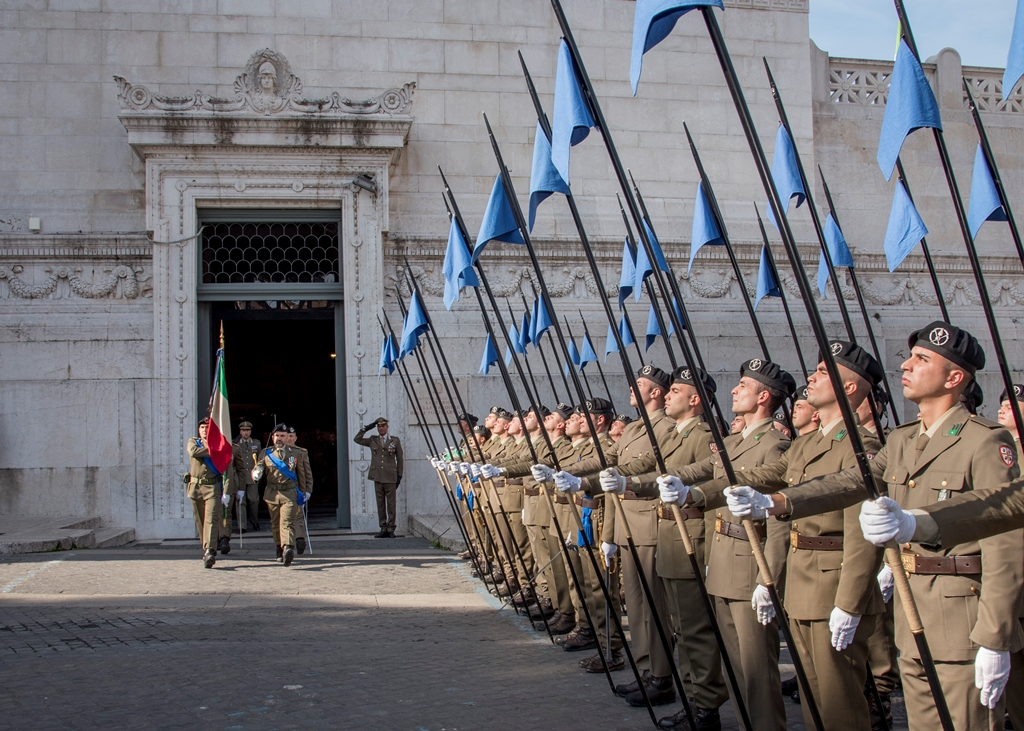
A Regiment "Lancieri di Montebello" (8th) honor guard salutes the flag of the Logistic Battalion "Cremona" as it leaves the Shrine of the Flags

The Logistic Battalion "Cremona" (Italian: Battaglione Logistico "Cremona") is an inactive military logistics battalion of the Italian Army, which was assigned to the Motorized Brigade "Cremona". Since 1 November 2019, the flag of the Logistic Battalion "Cremona" is assigned to the Logistic Regiment "Sassari" in Sardinia. The battalion's anniversary falls, as for all units of the Italian Army's Transport and Materiel Corps, on 22 May, the anniversary of the Royal Italian Army's first major use of automobiles to transport reinforcements to the Asiago plateau to counter the Austro-Hungarian Asiago Offensive in May 1916.

== History ==
The battalion is the spiritual successor of the logistic units of the 44th Infantry Division "Cremona", which in March 1941 was transferred from Tuscany to Sardinia. On 11 November 1942, after the Allies had landed in French North Africa Italy and Germany occupied Vichy France in Operation Anton. As part of the operation the "Cremona" division was ferried from Sardinia to Corsica, where the division occupied the southern half of the island. In the evening of 8 September 1943, the Armistice of Cassibile, which ended hostilities between the Kingdom of Italy and the Anglo-American Allies, was announced by General Dwight D. Eisenhower on Radio Algiers and by Marshal Pietro Badoglio on Italian radio. The next day the "Cremona" division and its sister division, the 20th Infantry Division "Friuli", fought the German Sturmbrigade Reichsführer SS and 90th Panzergrenadier Division, which were retreating through Corsica to the harbour of Bastia in the island's North.

After the operations in Corsica the "Cremona" division returned to Sardinia and joined the Italian Co-belligerent Army. In September 1944 the division was reduced to two infantry regiments (21st Infantry Regiment "Cremona" and 22nd Infantry Regiment "Cremona") and one artillery regiment (7th Artillery Regiment "Cremona"). The division was equipped with British weapons and materiel and renamed Combat Group "Cremona". On 12 January 1945, the combat group entered the front as part of the British V Corps. In April 1945, when allied forces achieved a major breakthrough during the 1945 spring offensive, the Combat Group "Cremona" advanced towards Venice and liberated the city on 30 April 1945.

=== Cold War ===
On 15 October 1945, the Combat Group "Cremona" was renamed Infantry Division "Cremona". On 1 November 1956, the logistic units of the division were assigned to the newly formed Service Units Command "Cremona" in Venaria Reale. The command consisted of a medical section, a provisions section, a mobile vehicle park, a mobile workshop, and an auto unit. On 1 November 1961, the mobile vehicle park, mobile workshop, and the light workshops of the division's regiments merged to form the Resupply, Repairs, Recovery Unit "Cremona".

On 1 January 1972, the Service Units Command "Cremona" was reorganized as Services Grouping Command "Cremona". The command consisted of a command, the Auto Unit "Cremona", the reserve Medical Battalion "Cremona", a provisions company in Turin, and the Resupply, Repairs, Recovery Unit "Cremona" in Venaria Reale. As part of the 1975 army reform the Infantry Division "Cremona" was reduced to Motorized Brigade "Cremona". On 30 October 1975, the Services Grouping Command "Cremona" was reduced to Logistic Battalion "Cremona", which received the traditions of all preceding logistic, transport, medical, maintenance, and supply units bearing the name "Cremona". The battalion consisted of a command, a command platoon, a supply and transport company, a medium workshop, a vehicle park, and a medical company. At the time the battalion fielded 651 men (37 officers, 82 non-commissioned officers, and 532 soldiers).

On 12 November 1976, the President of the Italian Republic Giovanni Leone granted with decree 846 the battalion a flag.

On 1 October 1981, the battalion was reorganized and consisted afterwards of the following units:

- Logistic Battalion "Cremona", in Turin
  - Command and Services Company
  - Supply Company
  - Maintenance Company
  - Medium Transport Company
  - Medical Unit (Reserve)

=== Recent times ===
On 5 November 1996, the Logistic Battalion "Cremona" was disbanded and parts of its personnel and materiel transferred to the 1st Military Region Logistic Unit "Monviso". On 13 November 1996, the flag of the Logistic Battalion "Cremona" was transferred to the Shrine of the Flags in the Vittoriano in Rome for safekeeping. The flag was kept at the Vittoriano until 28 October 2019. On that day, the commander of the Logistic Regiment "Sassari" and that regiment's flag team retrieved the flag of the Logistic Battalion "Cremona" in the Vittoriano and transferred it to Sardinia, where the following 1 November the flag was assigned to the Logistic Regiment "Sassari".

== See also ==
- Military logistics
