= Ponte dei Mulini, Mantua =

Coordinates: 45°10′N 10°47′E

The Ponte dei Mulini is the name attached to the mainly man-made separations made across the Mincio River at Mantua, region of Lombardy, Italy. Never truly one "bridge" however the harnessed passage of the water from the upper, Lago Superiore, to the lower Lago di Mezzo, has been utilized by the local inhabitants to power mills for nearly 900 years, and hydroelectric generation in the present.

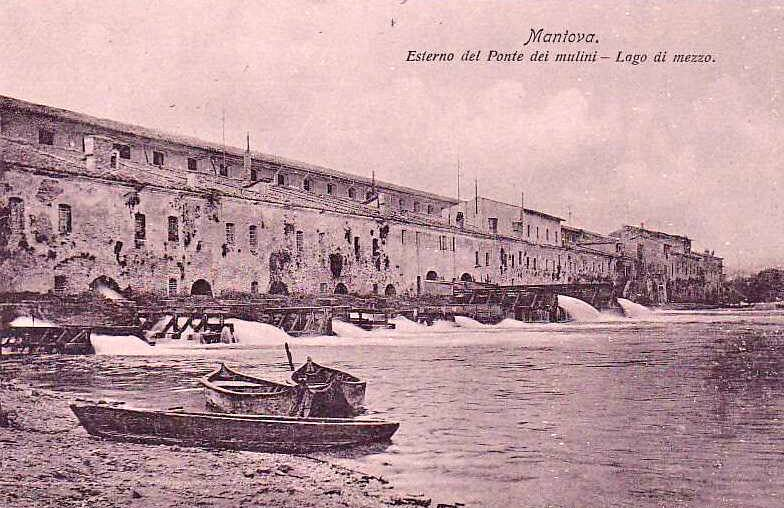
Circa 1920, photo showing the now absent mills viewed from Lago di Mezzo

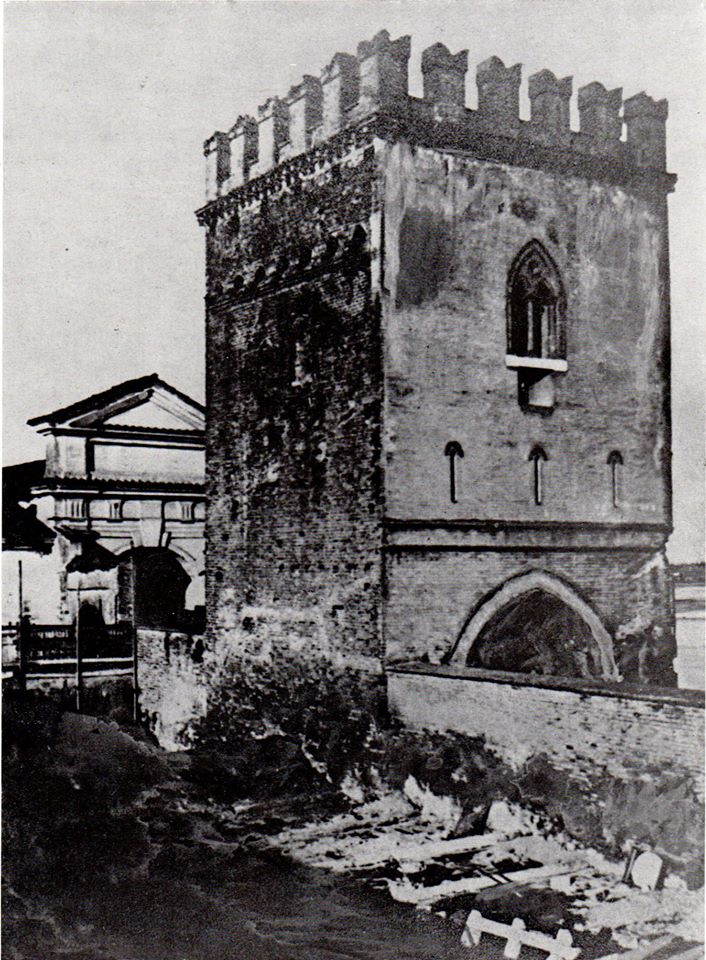
Defensive tower, Torrione, once located on southern access to Ponte, razed 1905

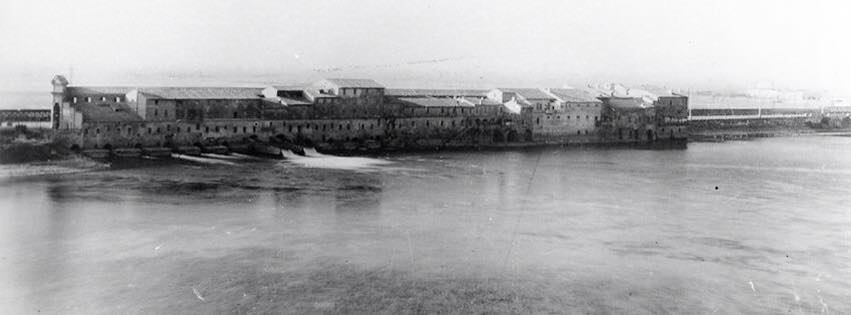
Ponte dei Mulini before Allied bombing of the bridge razed the mills

Circa the year 1188, the architect Alberto Pitentino designed a series of dams to flood the swampy area North and West of the medieval city of Mantua. This set of walls create the Lago Superiore. Use of the kinetic energy of the water flow was directed through at least 12 dozen mills, each named after a separate apostle, built along the dam. Work continued on the structure until 1230.

During the wars of the Visconti and Gonzaga in the 14th century, one effort was to try to rechannel the Mincio, but the effort failed and a breached dam cause a portion of the structure to be damaged, leading to the construction of a rounded dam called della rota.

At the north end of the bridge, circa 1530, Federico II Gonzaga, Duke of Mantua commissioned from Giulio Romano construction of a fortress, Porta Giulia, defending access to the city. It was restored in 1752 by the engineer Antonio Maria Azzalini under the patronage of Empress Maria Teresa.

In 1851 the Verona-Mantua railway was completed, requiring further railway bridges to be built. Allied bombardment of this rail line in 1944 razed the mills. Presently, the structure has a both track and a major highway SS262. On the northeast flank is a tree-lined bicycle and pedestrian lane. A lock allows for boats to traverse from one side to the other. A covered bridge once emerging from the city is also no longer extant.
