= Motorized Brigade "Cremona" =

Brigata Motorizzata "Cremona"
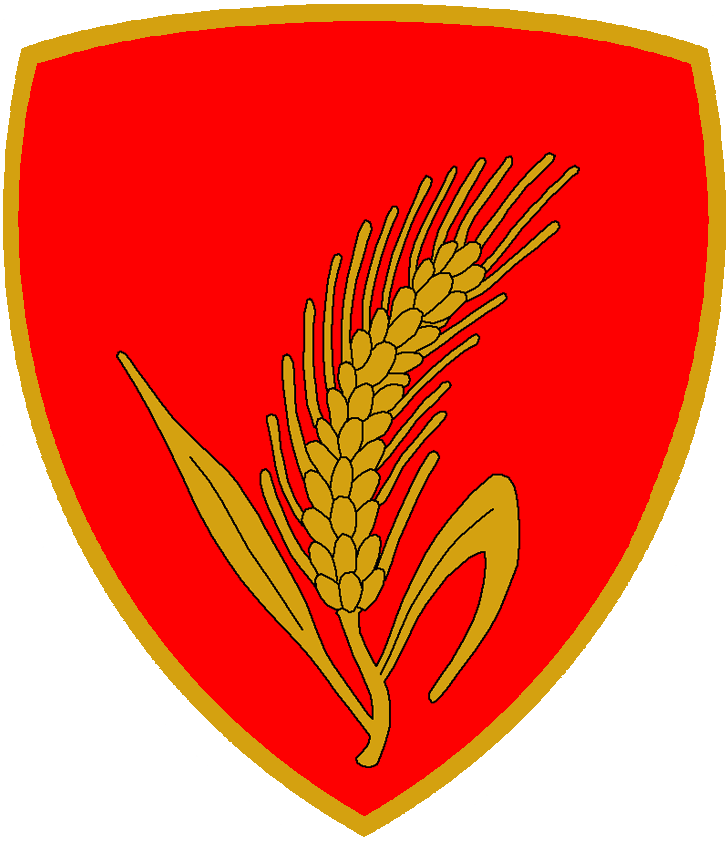
- Coat of Arms of the Motorized Brigade "Cremona"
- Active: 29 August 1859 - 1926; 30 October 1975 - 15 November 1996
- Country: Italy
- Branch: Italian Army
- Type: Infantry
- Part of: 3rd Army Corps
- Garrison/HQ: Turin

The Motorized Brigade "Cremona" was an infantry brigade of the Italian Army. The brigade's headquarters was in the city of Turin. The brigade carried on the name and traditions of the 44th Infantry Division "Cremona".

== History ==
=== Constitution ===
After the Second Italian War of Independence the Austrian Empire had to cede the Lombardy region of the Kingdom of Lombardy–Venetia to the Kingdom of Sardinia. After taking control of the region the government of Sardinia ordered the Royal Sardinian Army on 29 August 1859 to raise five infantry brigades and one grenadier brigade in Lombardy. Subsequently, on 1 November 1859 the Brigade "Cremona" was activated with the 21st Infantry Regiment and 22nd Infantry Regiment, which had been re-raised on 29 August 1859.

Together with the Brigade "Brescia" in Bergamo and the 6th Field Artillery Regiment it formed the 6th Division of the Line. The brigade was quickly sent to Southern Italy to suppress the popular revolt of the peasant population against the annexation of the Kingdom of the Two Sicilies into the new Kingdom of Italy.

During the Third Italian War of Independence the brigade participated in General Enrico Cialdinis march from the lower Po river to Isonzo river in July 1866.

=== World War I ===
At the outbreak of hostilities between Kingdom of Italy and the Austrian Empire in 1915 the Cremona along with the "Friuli" Brigade formed the 16th Division of the Line. For next years the brigade was on the Isonzo front and participated in the twelve Battles of the Isonzo. After the Italian Army's collapse after the Twelfth Battle of the Isonzo the brigade managed to retreat to the Piave front, but had to absorb the remnants of the "Tortona" Brigade to compensate for the heavy losses it had suffered. In 1918 the brigade fought in the second and third Battles of Monte Grappa. For their conduct during the war the brigade's two regiments were each an awarded a Silver Medal of Military Valor.

=== World War II ===
In 1926 the brigade received the 88th Infantry Regiment "Friuli" and became the infantry component of the 20th Infantry Division "Curtatone and Montanara". The same year the brigade was renamed as XX Infantry Brigade. On 24 August 1939 the 20th Infantry Division "Curtatone and Montanara" was split into the 20th Infantry Division "Friuli" and the 44th Infantry Division "Cremona". The Cremona consisted of the 21st and 22nd Infantry Regiment, 7th Artillery Regiment and the XC CCNN Battalion "Pisa".

In June 1940, the division was mobilized and took part in the Italian invasion of France as a part of the Italian XV Army Corps, but due to the quick German victory in the Battle of France the division was not involved in any operations before the French surrender. Afterwards the division was based as garrison unit on Sardinia. When Italy and Germany occupied Vichy France in Operation "Anton" after the Allied landings in French North Africa the division was ferried to Southern Corsica on 8 November 1942 to occupy the island, while the 20th Infantry Division "Friuli" occupied Northern Corsica.

After the armistice between Italy and the Allies on 3 September 1943 the division in conjunction with the 20th Infantry Division "Friuli" and French Partisans engaged in heavy combat with the German Sturmbrigade Reichsführer SS and 90th Panzergrenadier Division and the Italian XII Parachute Battalion of the 184th Parachute Regiment of the 184th Infantry Division "Nembo", which came from Sardinia and retreated through Corsica towards the harbor of Bastia in the island's north. On 13 September elements of the Free French 4th Moroccan Mountain Division landed in Ajaccio to support the Italian efforts to stop the 30,000 retreating German troops. But during the night of 3 to 4 October the last German units were evacuated from Bastia leaving behind 700 dead and 350 POWs.

After the end of operations on Corsica the division was sent as to Sardinia where the 90th CCNN Legion was renamed as 321st Infantry Regiment "Cremona". In September 1944 the division was reduced to two infantry (21st, 22nd) and one artillery regiment (7th), armed with British weapons and materiel and renamed as Combat Group "Cremona". The "Cremona" Group entered the front on 12 January 1945 as part of the British V Corps. When allied forces achieved a major breakthrough during the Spring offensive in 1945 the Cremona advanced towards Venice and liberated it on 30 April 1945.

=== Cold War ===
==== Infantry Division "Cremona" ====
After the war the combat group was garrisoned in Turin as the sole major unit of the I Territorial Military Command, which was based in Turin and had control of the Aosta and Piedmont regions. On 15 October 1945 the group returned to its old name and became again the Infantry Division "Cremona" with its traditional units: the 21st Infantry Regiment "Cremona", 22nd Infantry Regiment "Cremona" and 7th Field Artillery Regiment. In the following years the division was augmented: in 1947 with the 17th Field Artillery Regiment, 52nd Anti-tank Field Artillery Regiment, 1st Light Anti-aircraft Artillery Regiment and the 1st Dragoons Reconnaissance Group, and on 1 January 1951 with the 157th Infantry Regiment "Liguria". On 1 April 1951 the 1st Dragoons Reconnaissance Group was expanded to the 1st Armoured Cavalry Regiment "Nizza Cavalleria" armed with M24 Chaffee light tanks.

Upon entry into the III Army Corps in Milan on 1 July 1957 the division ceded the 52nd Anti-tank Field Artillery Regiment and the 1st Light Anti-aircraft Artillery Regiment to the corps. Soon afterwards the 17th Field Artillery Regiment was merged into the 7th Field Artillery Regiment, which received M114 155 mm howitzers for its four artillery groups. At the same time the 1st Armoured Cavalry Regiment "Nizza Cavalleria" was reduced to I Reconnaissance Group "Nizza Cavalleria". In 1969 the 22nd Infantry Regiment "Cremona" was reorganized as an armored infantry regiment consisting of the XIV Tank Battalion with M47 Patton tanks and the VI Bersaglieri Battalion with M113 armored personnel carriers.

By 1974 the division had been fully motorized and consisted of:

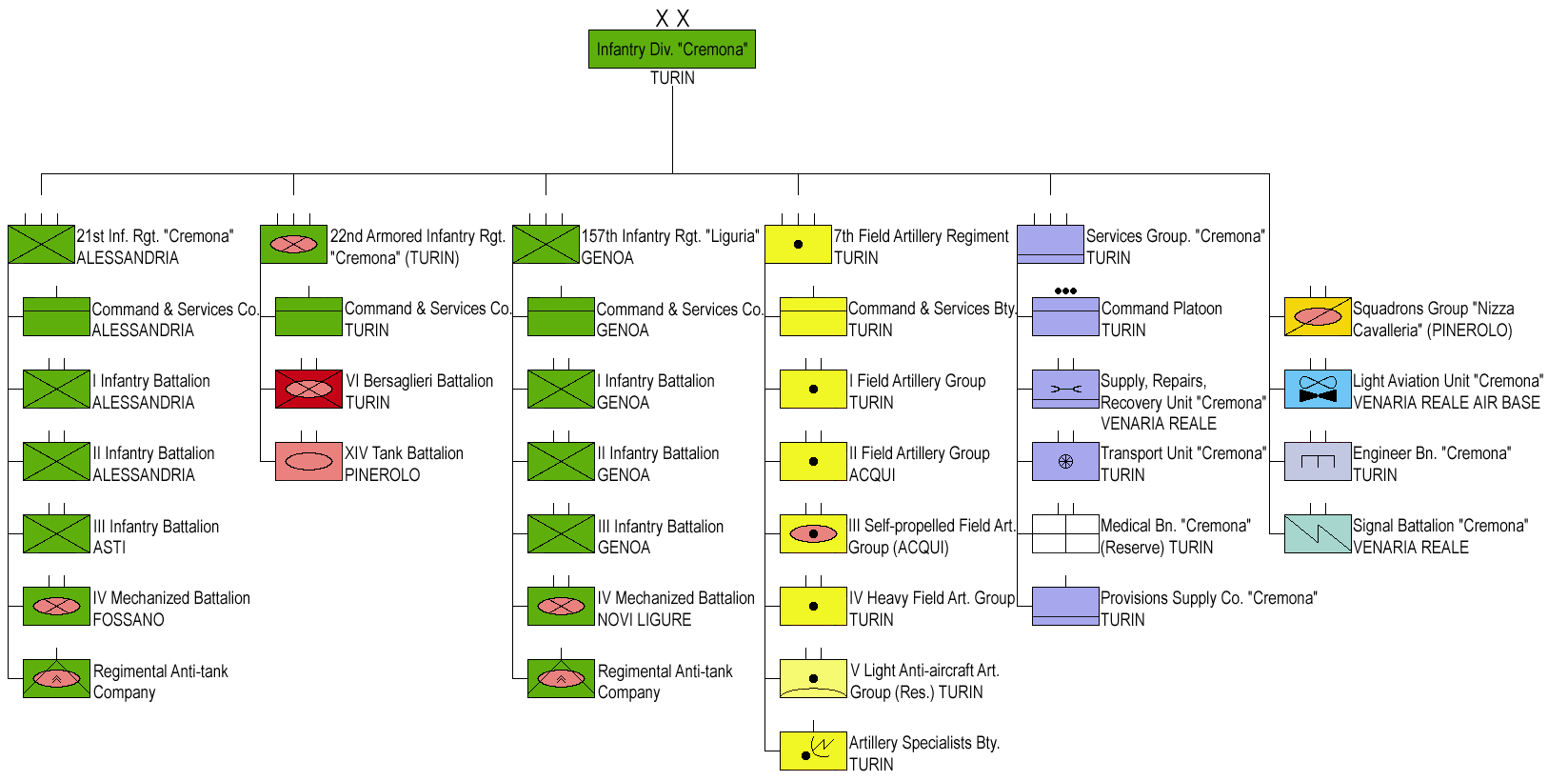
Infantry Division "Cremona" in 1974

- Infantry Division "Cremona", in Turin
  - 21st Infantry Regiment "Cremona", in Alessandria
    - Command and Services Company, in Alessandria
    - I Infantry Battalion, in Alessandria
    - II Infantry Battalion, in Alessandria
    - III Infantry Battalion, in Asti
    - IV Mechanized Battalion, in Fossano (M113 armored personnel carriers and M47 tanks)
    - Regimental Anti-tank Company, in (?) (anti-tank guided missiles and M47 tanks)
  - 22nd Armored Infantry Regiment "Cremona", in Turin
    - Command and Services Company, in Turin (includes an anti-tank guided missile platoon)
    - VI Bersaglieri Battalion, in Turin (M113 armored personnel carriers)
    - XIV Tank Battalion, in Pinerolo (M47 Patton tanks)
  - 157th Infantry Regiment "Liguria", in Genoa
    - Command and Services Company, in Genoa
    - I Infantry Battalion, in Genoa
    - II Infantry Battalion, in Genoa
    - III Infantry Battalion, in Genoa
    - IV Mechanized Battalion, in Novi Ligure (M113 armored personnel carriers and M47 tanks)
    - Regimental Anti-tank Company, in (?) (anti-tank guided missiles and M47 tanks)
  - 7th Field Artillery Regiment, in Turin
    - Command and Services Battery, in Turin
    - I Field Artillery Group, in Turin (M14/61 105 mm towed howitzers)
    - II Field Artillery Group, in Acqui (M14/61 105mm towed howitzers)
    - III Self-propelled Field Artillery Group, in Acqui (M7 105 mm self-propelled howitzers)
    - IV Heavy Field Artillery Group, in Turin (M114 155 mm towed howitzers)
    - V Light Anti-aircraft Artillery Group (Reserve), in Turin (Bofors 40 mm anti-aircraft guns and 12.7mm anti-aircraft machine guns)
    - Artillery Specialists Battery, in Turin
  - "Nizza Cavalleria" Squadrons Group, in Pinerolo (Fiat Campagnola reconnaissance vehicles and M47 Patton tanks)
  - Light Aviation Unit "Cremona", at Turin-Venaria Reale Air Base (L-19E Bird Dog light aircraft and AB 206 reconnaissance helicopters)
  - Engineer Battalion "Cremona", in Turin
  - Signal Battalion "Cremona", in Venaria Reale
  - Services Grouping "Cremona", in Turin
    - Command Platoon, in Turin
    - Supply, Repairs, Recovery Unit "Cremona", in Venaria Reale
    - Transport Unit "Cremona", in Turin
    - Medical Battalion "Cremona" (Reserve), in Turin
    - Provisions Supply Company "Cremona", in Turin

==== Motorized Brigade "Cremona" ====
Cremona units in 1989

In 1975 the Italian Army undertook a major reorganization of it forces: the regimental level was abolished and battalions came under direct command of multi-arms brigades. Therefore, on 30 October 1975 the Infantry Division "Cremona" was reduced to Motorized Brigade "Cremona". All regiments of the division along with most of their battalions had been disbanded a day earlier. Of the units that remained active the II/21st became the 21st Motorized Infantry Battalion "Alfonsine", the IV/21st became the 22nd Infantry Battalion "Primaro" (Recruits Training), the IV/157th became the 157th Motorized Infantry Battalion "Liguria", and the VI Bersaglieri Battalion became the 6th Bersaglieri Battalion "Palestro" and was transferred to the 3rd Mechanized Brigade "Goito". The IV Field Artillery Group of the 7th Field Artillery Regiment became the 7th Field Artillery Group "Adria". The names "Primaro", "Alfonsine" and "Adria" were chosen to commemorate three battles fought by the Combat Group "Cremona" during the allied Spring 1945 offensive in Italy. After the reform the brigade consisted of the following units:

- Motorized Brigade "Cremona", in Turin
  - Command and Signal Unit "Cremona", in Turin
  - 21st Motorized Infantry Battalion "Alfonsine", in Alessandria
  - 22nd Infantry Battalion "Primaro" (Recruits Training), in Fossano
  - 157th Motorized Infantry Battalion "Liguria", in Novi Ligure
  - 1st Armored Squadrons Group "Nizza Cavalleria", in Pinerolo (M47 Patton tanks and M113 APCs)
  - 7th Field Artillery Group "Adria", in Turin (M114 155 mm towed howitzers)
  - Logistic Battalion "Cremona", in Venaria Reale
  - Anti-tank Company "Cremona", in Turin (BGM-71 TOW anti-tank guided missiles)
  - Engineer Company "Cremona", in Pinerolo

The brigade also stored the equipment for a third maneuver battalion in Fossano, which in case of war would have been filled with reservists, and recruits from the 22nd Infantry (Recruits Training) Battalion "Primaro", and would have been named 50th Motorized Infantry Battalion "Parma".

After the end of the Cold War in 1989 the Italian Army had begun a massive downsizing of its forces and the Cremona soon began to change composition repeatedly. On 1 December 1989 the 22nd Infantry (Recruits Training) Battalion "Primaro" was disbanded. On 1 November 1990 the brigade received the 4th Infantry (Recruits Training) Battalion "Guastalla", which was disbanded and replaced by the 26th Infantry (Recruits Training) Battalion "Bergamo" on 30 April 1991. On 12 September of the same year the 1st Armored Squadrons Group "Nizza Cavalleria" left the brigade to become a corps level asset of the 3rd Army Corps. With the disbanding of many mechanized formations in North-Eastern Italy the Cremona received their materiel to become a mechanized brigade: the infantry battalions received VCC-2 armored personnel carriers, while the 7th "Adria" was equipped with M109 self-propelled howitzers. Accordingly, the brigade changed its name to Mechanized Brigade "Cremona". At the same time the brigade's battalions returned to be named regiments for traditional reasons. In 1992 the Anti-tank Company was disbanded and the Engineer Company merged into the Command and Signal Unit to form the Command and Tactical Supports Unit "Cremona". By 1993 the brigade fielded the following units:

- Mechanized Brigade "Cremona", in Turin
  - Command and Tactical Supports Unit "Cremona", in Turin
  - 21st Infantry Regiment "Cremona", in Alessandria
  - 26th Infantry Battalion "Bergamo" (Recruits Training), in Diano Castello
  - 157th Infantry Regiment "Liguria", in Novi Ligure
  - 7th Field Artillery Regiment "Cremona", in Turin
  - Logistic Battalion "Cremona", in Venaria Reale

In 1996 the Army decided to disbanded another six brigades and one of them was the Cremona. Already on 21 September 1995 the 7th Field Artillery Regiment "Cremona" had moved from Turin to Civitavecchia where it joined the Mechanized Brigade "Granatieri di Sardegna". On 13 October 1995 the 157th Infantry Regiment "Liguria" was disbanded. On 5 November 1996 the 21st Infantry Regiment "Cremona" was transferred to the Armored Brigade "Centauro" and the 26th Infantry (Recruits Training) Battalion "Bergamo" returned to the 3rd Army Corps. On the same date the Logistic Battalion "Cremona" was merged with the Transport Battalion "Monviso" to form the 1st Military Region Logistic Unit "Monviso". On 15 November 1996 the brigade was disbanded and its flag transferred to the Shrine of the Flags in the Vittoriano in Rome.
