= Battle of Mortara =

Battle between Austrian and Italian forces in 1849

- Part of the First Italian War of Independence
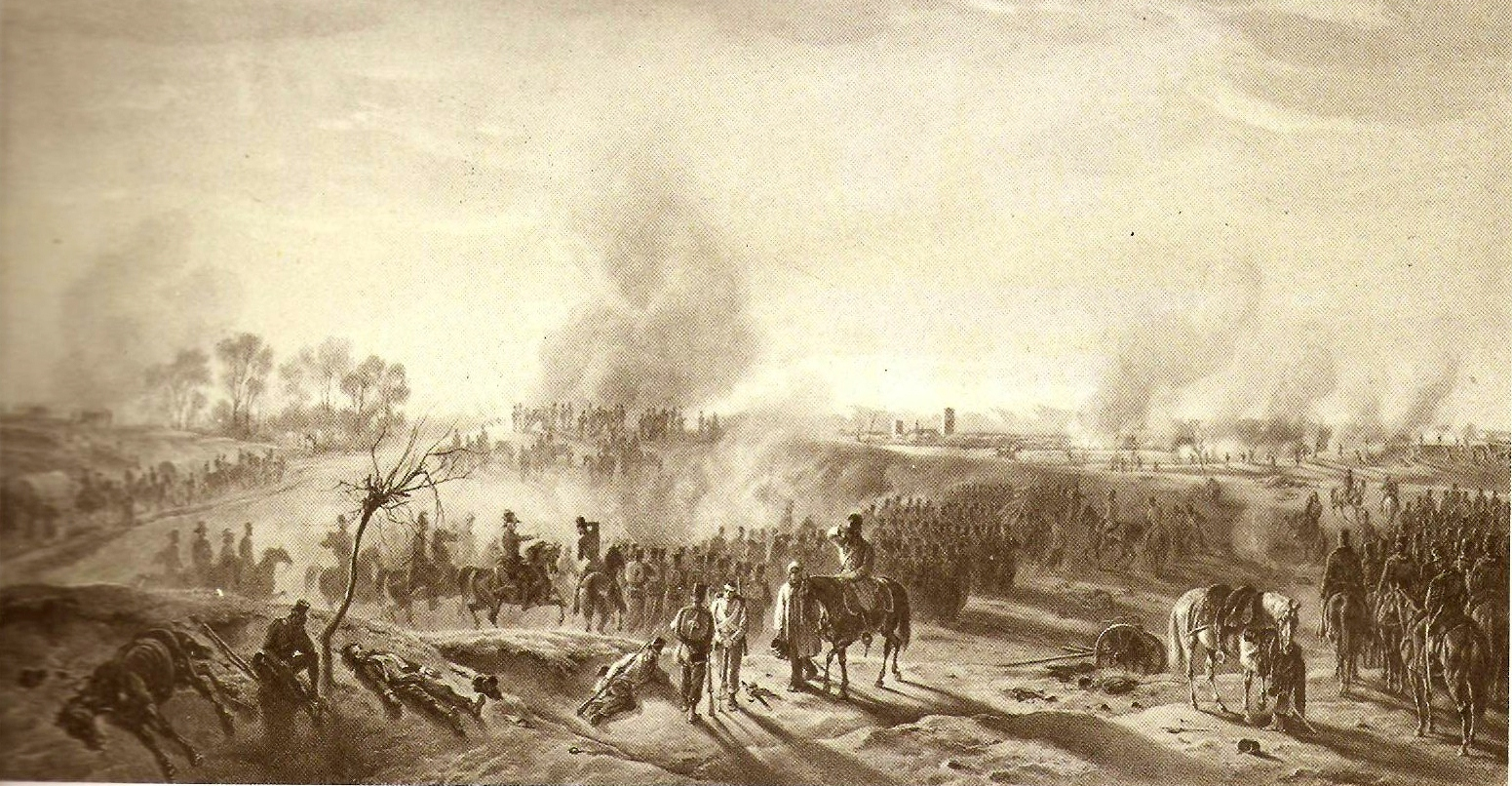
- Clash between Austrian and Piedmontese troops at the battle of Mortara.
Date	21 March 1849
Location	Mortara, Piedmont (present-day Italy)
Result	Austrian victory

Belligerents
Piedmont-Sardinia	(Austrian Empire) Austria

Commanders and leaders
King Karl Albert; Wojciech Chrzanowski	(Austrian Empire) Joseph Radetzky von Radetz

Strength
26,000	19,000

Casualties and losses
2,400	350

The Battle of Mortara was fought between 19,000 Austrian and 26,000 Italian forces on 21 March 1849. It was an Austrian tactical success.

== Background ==
King Karl Albert refused to accept the defeat of the previous year against Field Marshal Radetzky and saw the uprising of the Hungarians as a given occasion to continue the war. A coup in February 1849 against Grand Duke Leopold II of Habsburg in Tuscany gave the necessary reason to continue the Italian War of Independence. With an army of 97,500 men (including 5,600 horsemen) and 152 cannons, the troops of the Kingdom of Sardinia were to move back into Lombardy. The Piedmontese army wanted under their new chief of staff, the Polish General Wojciech Chrzanowski, to take action directly on Milan and so they could get the population of this city to revolt like last year. The Austrians quickly became aware of the enemy’s military plan. It was therefore confidently assumed on the part of the Piedmontese that the Austrian army would retreat behind the Adda to the fortress square around Mantua, as in 1848.

== Battle ==
Field Marshal Radetzky decided on March 21 to concentrate his forces at Mortara and then turn against either Vercelli or Novara; here or there he wanted to meet the main army of the Piedmontese.

The 1st Brigade of the Sardinian 3rd Division arrived at Vigevano around noon with the King and Chrzanowski, however the 2nd Brigade of this division together with the Duke of Genoa couldn't be expected until around 5:00 pm. General Chrzanowski had General Alessandro La Marmorasent to Mortara to execute his orders on the left wing while General Durando's troops with the Sardinian 1st Division, deployed between Garlasco and San Giorgio di Lomellina, leaned between the monastery of Sant'Albino as far as the cemetery. The front line was covered on the left by the Brigade Aosta (General Lovera), the cavalry and some reserves on the right commanded the Brigade Regina (General Trotti). The division of Duke Victor Emmanuel of Savoy instead arrived at Castel d'Agogna and marched on the left behind Durando's troops. Due to the difficult terrain, there was no connection between the two divisions; the whole fighting was a burden on the Regina Brigade, which could not be supported after the Austrian attack.

Meanwhile, the II Corps of the Austrians under General d'Aspre and the division of Archduke Albrecht von Österreich-Teschenwhich started the attack at 5:00 p.m. Mortara was quickly stormed and the Piedmontese were forced to retreat at all points. The poorly trained Sardinian troops fled back to Mortara, pursued by the Austrians, of whom three battalions occupied the entrance to Garlasco. La Marmora's attempt to use a retained battalion of the Regina Brigade to counterattack totally failed. Due to the early darkness, these divisions were mistaken for enemy forces and were under friendly fireattack by Cuneo's own brigade. The Sardinian troops at St. Albino didn't help, since the defeat of the Regina Brigade against the soldiers of the Austrian Kolowrat Brigade became obvious, so they left their positions at the monastery and withdrew to Mortara with both battalions of the Cuneo Brigade.

By owning Mortara and the road junction between Novara and Vigevano, the Austrians had already gained crucial advantages. The Piedmontese were flanked and unable to call for further reinforcements, their only option was to retreat northwards. Benedek had already arrived in Mortara with a battalion from the Gyulai regiment and captured the city with only 150 men. When the battalions of the Brigade Cuneo and Regina, which was commanded by La Marmora, approached, Benedek was still numerically inferior, but demanded the surrender of the Piedmontese, many of whom surrendered. 56 officers and 2,000 men stretched out their weapons in front of Benedek, including Colonels Delfino and Abrate. As a result of the march on the flank, victory for the Austrians was achieved. Troops of the Savoy Division tried to counterattack with two battalions of the Cuneo Brigade after San Giorgio, but completely failed.

Casualties for the Piedmontese were 500 men lost and another 2,000 captured. They also lost many important positions. The Austrians on the other hand only lost 190 men. Other estimates, such as Gaston Bodart, give different data: among the Austrians 310 dead or wounded and 40 captured or missing, while among the Piedmontese 300 dead or wounded and 2,100 captured or missing, along with 6 cannons.

== Aftermath ==
During the night the rest of the Regina Brigade retreated to Novara, where on the morning of March 22nd the Aosta Brigade, four squadrons of the Novara Cavalry Regiment and the reserve artillery provided sufficient support. King Karl Albert received notification of the defeat at Mortara on March 22 at 2:00 a.m., but was still confident that the war could be won.

Despite the victory of Mortara, Field Marshal Radetzky still couldn't take advantage of the resulting favorable situation, since he chose to attack the city of Vercelli, which he regarded as the "main camp" of the Piedmontese army. This misjudgment gave Chrzanowski the opportunity on March 22 to cut off only a fraction of the Austrian armed forces with the advantage of numbers. The pursuing troops under D'Aspre and Archduke Albert were repulsed, temporarily stopping the Austrian advance.

However, Radetzky recognized that his assumption was wrong, so he regrouped his armed forces and finally defeated the Piedmontese armed forces on March 23 in the Battle of Novara. After the decisive victory, Radetzky went to Vignale on March 24, where the meeting with the new King Victor Emmanuel II took place; the negotiated armistice was signed on March 26.

== Bibliography ==
- Bodart, Gaston (1908). Militär-historisches Kriegs-Lexikon (1618–1905). C. W. Stern. p. 507.
- Von Hilleprandt, Anton Edler (1864). Von Streffleur, Valentin Ritter (ed.). "various". Österreichische Militärische Zeitschrift: Der Feldzug in Piemont 1849 (in German). 1: 1, 65, 135, 199, 261, 333.
- Rüstow, Wilhelm (1862). Der italienische Krieg von 1848 und 1849: mit einer kurzen Kriegstheorie in Kritischen Bemerkungen über die Ereignisse (in German). Zürich: Friedrich Schultheß.
- Schneidawind, Franz Joseph Adolph (1853). Der Feldzug der kaiserl. königl. österreichischen Armee unter Anführung des Feldmarschalls Grafen Radetzky in Italien in den Jahren 1848 und 1849 (in German). Vol. 1. Innsbruck: Verlag von U. Witting.
- Kriegsbegebenheiten bei der kaiserlich österreichischen Armee in Italien vor Venedig von Anfangs November 1848 bis Ende August 1849 (in German). Vol. 3. Wieden, Wien: Kaiserlich-königlichen Hof- und Staatsdruckerei. 1850.
- Kunz, Hermann (1890). Die Feldzüge des Feldmarschalls Radetzky in Oberitalien 1848 und 1849 (in German). Leipzig: Verlag von Arwed Strauch.
- Regele, Oskar (1955). Neue Deutsche Biographie: Benedek, Ludwig von (in German). Vol. 2. Berlin: Duncker & Humblot. p. 42.
