= Mincio =

Mincio/Sarca
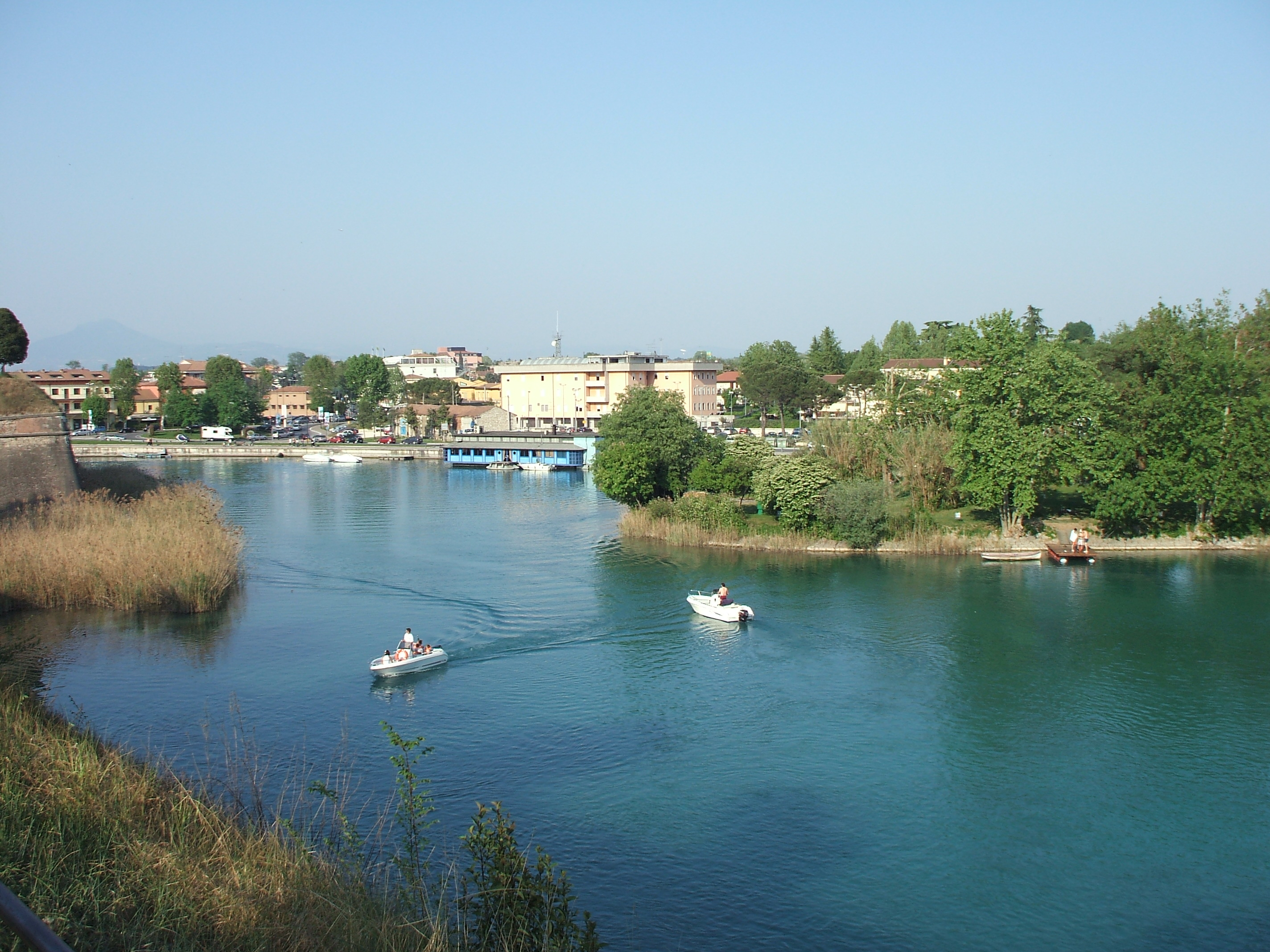
- The Mincio at Peschiera del Garda.
- Native name: Mens (Lombard); Menzo (Venetian)

Location
- Country: Italy

Physical characteristics
- Source
  - location: Pinzolo, Italy (Sarca), Peschiera del Garda, Italy (Mincio)
  - elevation: 770 m (2,530 ft) (Sarca); 65 m (213 ft) (Mincio)
- Mouth: Po
  - coordinates: 45°04′16″N 10°58′55″E
- Length: 194 km (121 mi)(total); 78 km (48 mi) (Sarca) 41 km (25 mi) (Lake Garda); 75 km (47 mi) (Mincio)
- Basin size: 2,859 km^{2} (1,104 sq mi)
- Discharge
  - average: 60 m^{3}/s (2,100 cu ft/s)

Basin features
- Progression: Po→ Adriatic Sea

The Mincio (Italian: [ˈmintʃo]; Lombard: Mens; Venetian: Menzo; Latin: Mincius; Ancient Greek: Μίγχιος, romanized: Mínchios) is a river in the Lombardy region of northern Italy.

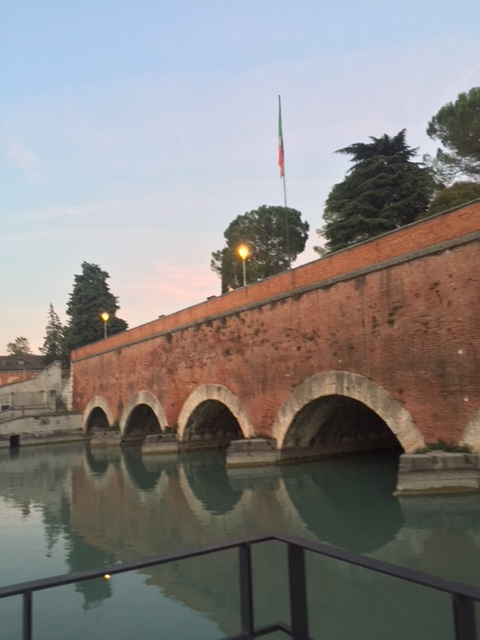
The bridge in Peschiera del Garda where Lake Garda discharges into the Mincio, denoting the beginning of the river.

The river is the main outlet of Lake Garda. It is a part of the Sarca-Mincio river system which also includes the river Sarca and Lake Garda. The river starts from the south-eastern tip of the lake at the town of Peschiera del Garda and then flows for about 65 kilometres (40 mi) past Mantua and into the river Po. From Lake Garda until it reaches Pozzolo, it forms the boundary between Veneto and Lombardy regions.

In the Etruscan period, the Mincio probably joined with the river Tartaro and flowed into the Adriatic Sea into the pit Filistina, in Roman Republic it was made to flow into the Po with three branches from Mantua by Quintus Curius Hostilius, subsequently reunited in a single embanked in 1198 on a project by Alberto Pitentino and regulated its course with several dams (Ponte dei Mulini, Mantua) and the Governolo) dam to make it navigable, to prevent Mantua from being flooded by the flooding of the Po and to improve air quality.

At Mantua, the Mincio was widened in the late 12th century, forming a series of three (originally four) lakes that skirt the edges of the old city. The original settlement here, dating from about 2000 BC, was on an island in the Mincio.

The former lower part of the course of the Mincio flowed into the Adriatic Sea near Adria until the breach at Cucca in 589, roughly following the course of the river that is currently known by the name of Canal Bianco; it had been a waterway from the sea to the lake until then.

In 452 CE, Attila the Hun received an embassy sent by the Western Roman Emperor Valentinian III near this river. The Roman delegation was led by Pope Leo I. After this meeting, Attila withdrew from Italy.

The last act of Verdi's opera Rigoletto is set just outside Mantua, at an inn on the banks of the Mincio.
