= Regiment "Lancieri di Aosta" (6th) =

Active Italian Army lancer unit

- Reggimento "Lancieri di Aosta" (6°)
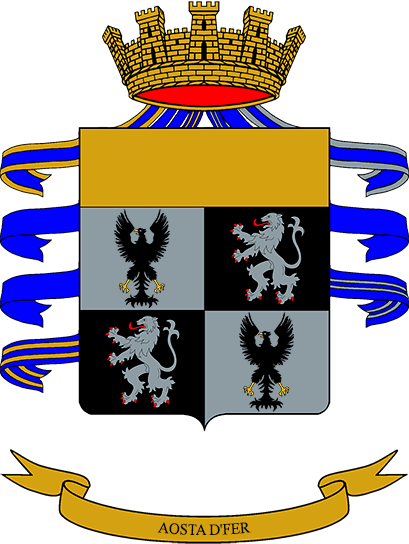
- Regimental coat of arms
- Active: 16 Sept. 1774 — 26 Oct. 1796; 3 Nov. 1831 — 14 Oct. 1943; 15 July 1951 — 15 Sept. 1964; 1 October 1975 — today
- Country: Italy
- Branch: Italian Army
- Part of: Mechanized Brigade "Aosta"
- Garrison/HQ: Palermo
- Motto: "Aosta d' fer"
- Anniversaries: 24 June 1866 - Battle of Custoza
- Decorations: 1× Gold Medal of Military Valor; 1× Silver Medal of Military Valor; 3× Bronze Medals of Military Valor; 1× War Cross of Military Valor; 1× Bronze Medal of Army Valor

Insignia
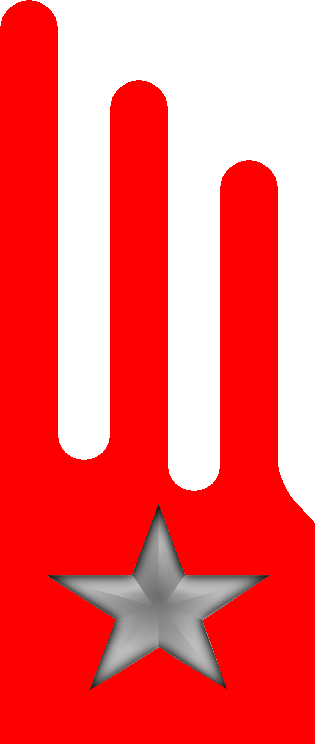
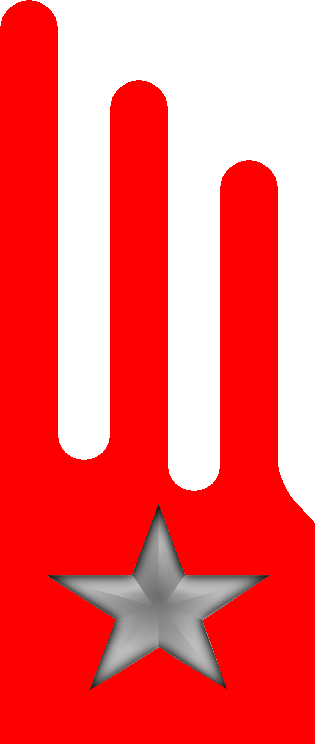
- Regimental gorget patches

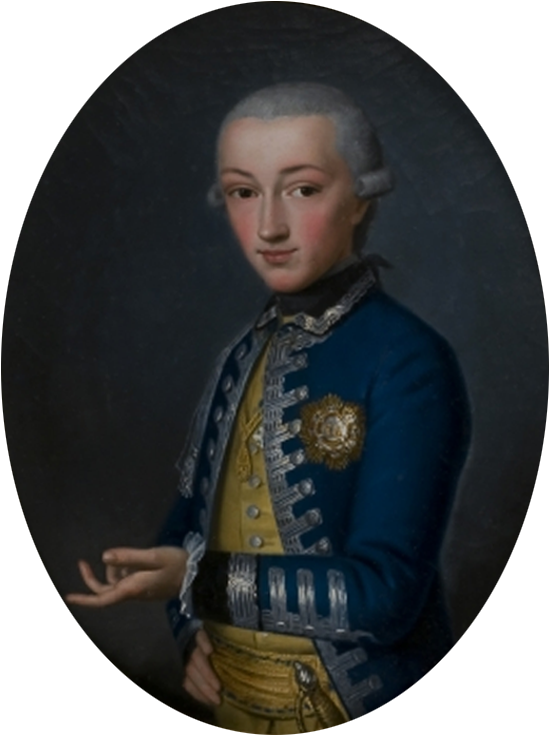
Fifteen-year-old Vittorio Emanuele I, Duke of Aosta was the regiment's honorary colonel and name giver at the regiment's founding

The Regiment "Lancieri di Aosta" (6th) (Italian: Reggimento "Lancieri di Aosta" (6°) - "Lancers of Aosta") is a cavalry unit of the Italian Army based in Palermo in Sicily. The regiment is the reconnaissance unit of the Mechanized Brigade "Aosta". In 1774, King Victor Amadeus III ordered to form two new cavalry regiments for the Royal Sardinian Army and named his son Victor Emmanuel, Duke of Aosta as honorary colonel of one of the two regiments. Consequently, Victor Emmanuel named his regiment Cavalry Regiment "Aosta". The regiment fought in the War of the First Coalition against French forces. However after Napoleon Bonaparte defeated the Royal Sardinian Army in the Montenotte campaign the regiment was disbanded in October of 1796.

The Regiment "Aosta Cavalleria" was reformed in 1831. In 1845, the regiment's troops were armed with lances. In 1848-49, the regiment fought in the First Italian War of Independence. During the Second Italian War of Independence the regiment distinguished itself in the Battle of Montebello. On 6 June 1860, the regiment joined the new Lancers speciality and was renamed Regiment "Lancieri di Aosta". In 1866, the regiment fought in the Third Italian War of Independence, during which it distinguished itself in the Battle of Custoza at Monte Vento and was awarded, as only the second Italian cavalry regiment, Italy's highest military honor the Gold Medal of Military Valor. In 1870, the regiment participated in the Capture of Rome.

In World War I the regiment fought on the Italian Front. In 1935, the regiment formed two machine gunners squadrons groups for the Second Italo-Ethiopian War. Both squadrons groups distinguished themselves in the conquest of the Galla-Sidamo region, for which each squadrons group was awarded a Bronze Medal of Military Valor. Both medals are today affixed to standard of the Regiment "Lancieri di Aosta" (6th). In April 1939, the regiment's command and I Squadrons Group participated in the Italian invasion of Albania. In 1940, the regiment fought in the Greco-Italian War. Afterwards the regiment remained on occupation duty in Greece. After the announcement of the Armistice of Cassibile on 8 September 1943, the regiment refused German demands to surrender, contacted the British Middle East Command, placed itself under British command, marched into the Pindus Mountains and joined the Greek partisans in their fight against the German occupiers. However, in October 1944, the Greek People's Liberation Army forced the regiment to surrender its weapons and interred the regiment's remaining troops.

In July 1951, the Italian Army reformed the regiment as 6th Armored Cavalry Regiment "Lancieri di Aosta" in Bologna. From its formation until October 1954, the regiment was assigned to the Infantry Division "Trieste" and then transferred to the VI Territorial Military Command. In 1964, the regiment was disbanded and its I Squadrons Group renamed Squadrons Group "Lancieri di Aosta". The same year the squadrons group moved to Cervignano del Friuli, where it joined the Infantry Division "Mantova" as the division's reconnaissance unit. In 1975, the squadrons group was reorganized, equipped with Leopard 1A2 main battle tanks and renamed 6th Tank Squadrons Group "Lancieri di Aosta". The squadrons group then joined the newly formed Armored Brigade "Vittorio Veneto" and was assigned the traditions and standard of the Regiment "Lancieri di Aosta" (6th). In July 1991, the Mechanized Brigade "Vittorio Veneto" was one of the first brigades to disband after the end of the Cold War and, consequently, in May of the same year, the 6th Tank Squadrons Group "Lancieri di Aosta" moved to Palermo, where it joined the Motorized Brigade "Aosta". In March 1992, the squadrons group lost its autonomy and entered the reformed Regiment "Lancieri di Aosta" (6th).

The regiment's anniversary falls on 24 June 1866, the day regiment distinguished itself in heavy combat at Monte Vento during the Battle of Custoza, for which the regiment was awarded Italy's highest military honor the Gold Medal of Military Valor. As the regiment is a lancer unit, its enlisted personnel is addressed as "Lancer" (Italian: Lanciere).

== History ==
=== Formation ===
On 20 February 1773, the King of Sardinia Charles Emmanuel III died and was succeeded by his son Victor Amadeus III, who set out to reform the Royal Sardinian Army. The army's cavalry regiments were assigned to the newly formed Department of the Cavalry, which consisted of a Wing of Dragoons and a Wing of Cavalry. Both wings consisted of two brigades of two regiments. On 28 August 1774, Victor Amadeus III ordered to complete the reform by forming two new cavalry regiments. With the same decree the King made his fifteen-year-old son Victor Emmanuel, Duke of Aosta and his brother Prince Benedetto, Duke of Chablais the two new regiments' honorary colonels. To form the new regiments, the six existing cavalry regiments would each cede two companies: the Regiment "Cavalleggeri di Sua Maestà", Cavalry Regiment "Piemonte Reale", and Cavalry Regiment "Savoia" would each cede two companies to help form a cavalry regiment, while the Regiment "Dragoni di Sua Maestà", Regiment "Dragoni di Piemonte" and Regiment "Dragoni della Regina" would each cede two companies to help form a dragoon regiment. On 16 September 1774, the two new regiments were formed and in Voghera Duke Victor Emmanuel named his regiment for his Duchy of Aosta Cavalry Regiment "Aosta", while on the same day Prince Benedetto named his regiment for his Duchy of Chablais Regiment "Dragoni del Chiablese".

The Cavalry Regiment "Aosta" consisted of three squadrons, with each squadron consisting of two companies. The companies had administrative functions and each fielded 47 officers and troops, including the company's support personnel. Two companies formed one squadron, with a squadron's first company fielding 38 mounted troops, while the second company fielded 37 mounted troops. On 23 April 1778, the regiment formed its fourth squadron and now consisted of 300 mounted troops and a regimental staff. After the reform the Sardinian Cavalry, which excluded the Dragoons of Sardinia stationed in Sardinia, consisted of the following units:

Department of the Cavalry
| Wing of Dragoons | | Wing of Cavalry | |
| Brigade "Dragoni di Sua Maestà" | Brigade "Dragoni di Piemonte" | Brigade "Cavalleggeri di Sua Maestà" | Brigade "Piemonte Reale" |
| Regiment "Dragoni di Sua Maestà" | Regiment "Dragoni di Piemonte" | Regiment "Cavalleggeri di Sua Maestà" | Cavalry Regiment "Piemonte Reale" |
| Regiment "Dragoni della Regina" | Regiment "Dragoni del Chiablese" | Cavalry Regiment "Savoia" | Cavalry Regiment "Aosta" |

=== French Revolutionary Wars ===
On 21 September 1792, French forces invaded the Duchy of Savoy and on 29 September the County of Nice. Due to these unprovoked attacks King Victor Amadeus III joined the War of the First Coalition against the French Republic. At the time the Sardinian cavalry fielded some 4,000 troops in eight regiments, each of which consisted of four squadrons of two companies. Additionally in Sardinia the Corps of Light Dragoons of Sardinia consisted of two squadrons of two companies. On 29 September 1792, the French invaded Nice, where also a squadron of the Cavalry Regiment "Aosta" was stationed. In the following retreat towards Piedmont the squadron had its baptism of fire. From 1792 to 1796, the regiment fought against the French Army of Italy. In March 1796 Napoleon Bonaparte arrived in Italy and took command of the French forces, with which he defeated the Royal Sardinian Army in the Montenotte campaign within a month. On 28 April 1796, King Victor Amadeus III had to sign the Armistice of Cherasco and, on 15 May 1796, the Treaty of Paris, which forced Sardinia out of the First Coalition. The treaty also codified the transfer of the Duchy of Savoy and the County of Nice to France, gave the French Army free passage through the Kingdom of Sardinia, and imposed a limit of 10,000 troops on the Royal Sardinian Army. On 16 October 1796, King Victor Amadeus III died and his eldest son Charles Emmanuel IV ascended the throne. On 26 October 1796, the new king ordered to reform and reduce the size of the Royal Sardinian Army and, on the same day, the army's two youngest cavalry regiments: "Dragoni del Chiablese" and "Aosta" were disbanded. The 1st and 2nd squadrons of the Cavalry Regiment "Aosta" were transferred to the Cavalry Regiment "Piemonte Reale", while the 3rd and 4th squadrons were transferred to the Cavalry Regiment "Savoia".

=== Restoration ===
On 28 August 1831, the five Royal Sardinian Army cavalry regiments, Regiment "Piemonte Reale Cavalleria", Regiment "Cavalleggeri di Piemonte", Regiment "Cavalleggeri di Savoia", Regiment "Dragoni del Génévois", and Regiment "Dragoni di Piemonte", were reduced from eight to six squadrons and a depot squadron, which was to be formed in wartime and train new recruits. On 3 November of the same year, the personnel of the disbanded squadrons was used to reform the Regiment "Aosta Cavalleria" in Vercelli. The reformed regiment consisted of six squadrons and a depot squadron, which was to be formed in wartime. On 3 January 1832, the now six Royal Sardinian Army cavalry regiments were renamed uniformly as "Cavalleria". The troops of five regiments, including the Regiment "Aosta Cavalleria", were equipped with a flintlock musket, two flintlock pistols, and a sabre, while the troops of the Regiment "Piemonte Reale Cavalleria" continued to be equipped with a flintlock musket, two flintlock pistols, and a straight cavalry sword. At its formation the identifying color of the Regiment "Aosta Cavalleria" was defined as scarlet, which is still used as the color of the regiment's gorget patches today.

On 7 March 1835, the six cavalry regiments were grouped into two brigades: the I Brigade consisted of the regiments "Nizza Cavalleria", "Savoia Cavalleria" and "Novara Cavalleria", while the II Brigade consisted of the regiments "Piemonte Reale Cavalleria", "Genova Cavalleria" and "Aosta Cavalleria". On 15 March 1836, the 6th Squadron of all six cavalry regiments was reorganized as a depot squadron. During the same year the troops of one squadron of each regiment, with the exception of the Regiment “Piemonte Reale Cavalleria”, replaced their flintlock musket with a lance. On 4 October of the same year, the number of brigades was increased from two to three and the regiments were reassigned: the I Brigade consisted now of the regiments "Nizza Cavalleria" and "Genova Cavalleria", the II Brigade of the regiments "Piemonte Reale Cavalleria" and "Novara Cavalleria", and the III Brigade of the regiments "Savoia Cavalleria" and "Aosta Cavalleria".

In 1841, all six regiments were uniformly organized and equipped: the troops of the regiments' first four squadrons were equipped with a flintlock musket, two flintlock pistols, and a sabre, while the troops of the regiments' fifth squadron were equipped with a lance, two flintlock pistols, and a sabre. On 1 January 1842, the six regiments disbanded their depot squadrons. In 1843, each regiments equipped a second squadron with lances. On 17 March 1845, all six regiments replaced their flintlock muskets and flintlock pistols with a percussion pistolone — a pistol with a shoulder stock and were issued lances. Afterwards all of the regiment's troops were equipped with a lance, a pistolone and a sabre.

=== Italian Wars of Independence ===
==== First Italian War of Independence ====
In 1848 revolutionary riots broke out in many parts of Europe, including numerous places in Italy. In March 1848, the revolts also spread into the Austrian Empire, where Milan (Five Days of Milan) and Venice (Republic of San Marco) rebelled against the House of Habsburg. The battles were particularly heated in Milan, where the commander of the army of Lombardy–Venetia, Marshal Josef Radetzky, was forced to abandon the city. As a result of this, other revolts broke out in Lombardy–Venetia. With Vienna itself in revolt, the Austrian Empire was tottering. On 23 March, one day after the end of the Five Days of Milan, King Charles Albert of Sardinia declared war on Austria. Thus began the First Italian War of Independence.

On the same day King Charles Albert declared war the Royal Sardinian Army's six cavalry regiments reformed their depot squadrons. At the start of the campaign the cavalry's I Brigade was attached to the I Army Corps, while the II Brigade was attached to the II Army Corps, while the III Brigade was attached to the army reserve division. On 25 March 1848, King Charles Albert ordered to issue all cavalry regiments a 60cm wide square standard in the colors of the Italian flag with the arms of Savoy displayed in the center of the white pale. In the first days of April, the Regiment "Aosta Cavalleria" replaced the Regiment "Genova Cavalleria" in the I Brigade and thus led the Sardinian advance to the Goito, where on 8 April the regiment fought in the war's first clash, the Battle of Goito Bridge. On 6 May 1848, the regiment fought in the Battle of Santa Lucia and on 30 May in the Battle of Goito. On 23 and 24 July, the Regiment "Aosta Cavalleria" fought at Sommacampagna and the next day in the Battle of Custoza. In the evening of 27 July 1848, after the defeat in the Battle of Volta Mantovana, King Charles Albert ordered a retreat towards Milan. On 9 August, the Austrian General Heinrich von Heß and the Sardinian General Carlo Canera di Salasco signed the Armistice of Salasco, which stated that Charles Albert's troops would withdraw from the whole of the Kingdom of Lombardy–Venetia, and the Duchy of Parma and Piacenza and Duchy of Modena and Reggio. Thus ended the war's First Campaign.

On 1 March 1849, the Sardinian Chamber of Deputies voted for the resumption of the war, with 94 votes in favour and 24 against. King Charles Albert decided that hostilities would resume on 20 March and, as stipulated in the 1848 armistice, the Austrians were informed about the continuation of the war eight days before the hostilities resumed. Charles Albert then massed his army near Novara. At noon on 20 March, the whole Austrian Army crossed the Ticino river at Pavia and marched North towards Mortara and Vigevano. On 23 March 1849, Field Marshal Radetzky decisively defeated the Sardinians in the Battle of Novara, during which the Regiment "Aosta Cavalleria" distinguished itself. In the evening of 23 March, King Charles Albert abdicated in favour of his son Victor Emmanuel. On 24 March, the new king met with Radetzky at Vignale and agreed to an armistice, which ended the short Second Campaign of the First Italian War of Independence.

For its conduct in the Battle of Novara and the during the war's First Campaign, the Regiment "Aosta Cavalleria" was awarded a Silver Medal of Military Valor, which was affixed to the regiment's standard.

After the defeat in the First Italian War of Independence the Kingdom of Sardinia reformed its military and, on 3 January 1850, the Regiment "Aosta Cavalleria" was transferred, together with the Regiment "Novara Cavalleria", to the light cavalry and reorganized as a Chevau-léger unit. Consequently the regiment was renamed Regiment "Cavalleggeri di Aosta". On the same date, the regiment ceded its 5th and 6th squadrons to help from the Regiment "Cavalleggeri di Alessandria". After the reorganization the regiment consisted of a staff, four Chevau-léger squadrons, and a depot squadron. As part of the reorganization the regiment's troops replaced their Dragoon helmets with a scarlet kepi and were now armed with musket, pistol, and sabre.

On 22 September 1852, the Sardinian War Ministry ordered that the four line cavalry regiments, as well as the regiments "Cavalleggeri di Novara" and "Cavalleggeri di Aosta" should be armed with lance, sabre and pistolone. Consequently, the regiment's troops were once again issued lances, even though the regiment remained assigned to the army's light cavalry.

On 31 March 1855, the regiment's 1st Squadron was assigned to the Provisional Cavalry Regiment for the Sardinian expeditionary corps, which deployed to Crimea for the Crimean War. On 16 August 1855, the Provisional Cavalry Regiment fought in the Battle of the Chernaya. After the Crimean War the regiment was repatriated and, on 18 June 1856, disbanded and its squadrons returned to their original regiments.

==== Second Italian War of Independence ====
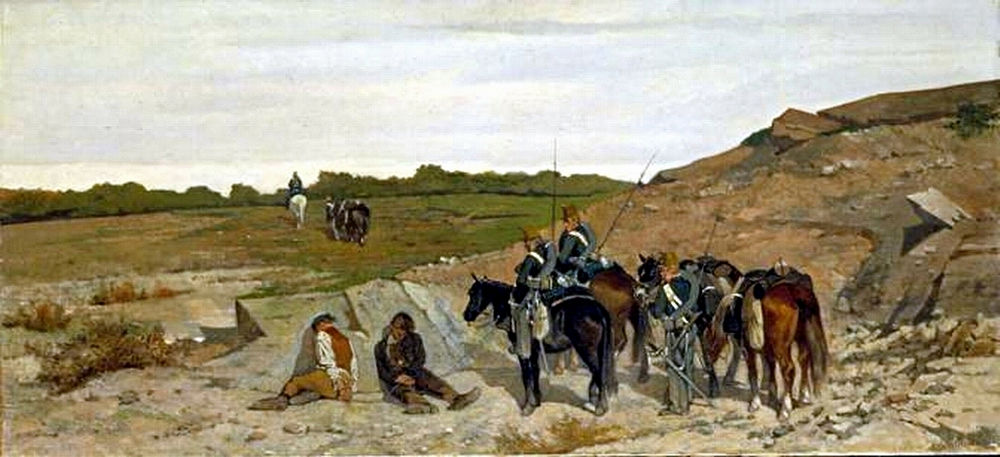
Lancers arresting two brigands in 1864

On 21 July 1858, French Emperor Napoleon III and the Prime Minister of Sardinia Camillo Benso, Count of Cavour met in Plombières and reached a secret verbal agreement on a military alliance between the French Empire and the Kingdom of Sardinia against the Austrian Empire. On 9 March 1859, Sardinia mobilized its army, followed by Austria on 9 April. On 23 April, Austria delivered an ultimatum to Sardinia demanding its demobilization. Upon Sardinia's refusal, Austria declared war on 26 April and three days later the Austrians crossed the Ticino river into Piedmont. Consequently, France honored its alliance with Sardinia and declared war on Austria on 3 May 1859, which led to the Second Italian War of Independence.

On 20 May, the Imperial Austrian Army's V Corps under Feldmarschall-leutnant Philipp von Stadion und Thannhausen advanced in three columns towards Voghera, where the French 1st Division under General Élie Frédéric Forey and a Sardinian cavalry brigade under Colonel Maurizio Gerbaix de Sonnaz were based. The Sardinian cavalry brigade consisted of three squadrons of the Regiment "Cavalleggeri di Novara", four squadrons of the Regiment "Cavalleggeri di Aosta", and the 3rd and 4th squadrons of the Regiment "Cavalleggeri di Monferrato". As soon as General Forey was informed of the Austrian advance, he ordered his division to march towards the enemy, which led to the Battle of Montebello. Around 14:00, the French 84th Infantry Regiment blocked the Austrian's left column at Genestrello to the West of Montebello, while the regiments "Cavalleggeri di Novara" and "Cavalleggeri di Monferrato" charged the Austrian column, which was forced to form squares. At the same time two French infantry battalions and the Regiment "Cavalleggeri di Aosta" stopped the advance of the Austrian right column at Casatisma. By 15:00, General Forey ordered one of his brigades to commence a frontal attack on the Austrian position in Montebello, while the division's second brigade would begin a maneuver to envelop the Austrians from the South. Between 16:00 and 17:00, General Forey dismounted and personally led his men up the hill to Montebello, while the Sardinian cavalry regiments continued to charge the Austrians. By 18:30, the village of Montebello was cleared of Austrian forces and Feldmarschall-leutnant von Stadion ordered his corps to fall back.

On 24 June 1859, the three armies met in the Battle of Solferino, during which the Regiment "Cavalleggeri di Aosta" was attached to the 2nd Sardinian Division, which consisted of the infantry brigades "Piemonte" and "Aosta". On 11 July 1859, Emperor Napoleon III and Emperor Franz Joseph I met at Villafranca and concluded the Armistice of Villafranca, which ended the war. After the conclusion of the armistice the French and Sardinian armies occupied Lombardy. On 16 September 1859, the Royal Sardinian Army's nine cavalry regiments ceded one squadron each to help form three new Chevau-légers regiments and the three squadrons ceded by the cavalry regiments "Cavalleggeri di Novara", "Cavalleggeri di Aosta" and "Cavalleggeri di Monferrato", which had distinguished themselves in the Battle of Montebello four months earlier, were used to form the Regiment "Cavalleggeri di Montebello" — the only Italian cavalry regiment named for a battle.

On 6 June 1860, the Sardinian War Ministry ordered that the army's cavalry regiments, which were equipped with lances — with the exception of the four line cavalry regiments — were to join the new Lancers speciality. Consequently, on the same day, the Regiment "Cavalleggeri di Aosta" was renamed Regiment "Lancieri di Aosta".

In 1862-65, the regiment operated in southern Italy to suppress the anti-Sardinian revolt, which had erupted after the Kingdom of Sardinia had annexed the Kingdom of the Two Sicilies. During this time the regiment was based in Terni, Santa Maria Capua Vetere, Lucera and then in Caserta, but operated in the Capitanata and Murge area. On 16 February 1864, the regiment ceded its 5th Squadron to help form the Regiment "Cavalleggeri di Caserta".

==== Third Italian War of Independence ====
On 20 June 1866, the Third Italian War of Independence between the Kingdom of Italy and the Austrian Empire began. During the war the Regiment "Lancieri di Aosta" formed, together with the Guides Regiment and Regiment "Cavalleggeri di Lucca", the Cavalry Brigade of the I Corps of the Army of the Mincio, which operated along the Mincio river. On 24 June 1866, the I Corps fought in the Battle of Custoza, during which the Regiment "Lancieri di Aosta" distinguished itself. At 6:00 in the morning of the day, the Italian I Corps encountered Austrian forces at Oliosi and soon the 1st Division and 5th Division of the I Corps were in heavy combat against the Austrian V Corps, which fielded twice the number of troops. After four hours of combat, the Italian 1st Division was badly mauled and needed to retreat. To cover the retreat of the Brigade "Pinerolo" the regiment's 2nd Squadron charged the pursuing Austrian infantry battalions twice, followed by the regiment's other squadrons. The relentless charges by the regiment and its squadrons allowed the 1st Division's infantry to establish a defensive line on Monte Vento, which held until the order to retreat to Valeggio arrived at 16:00. The lancers of the regiment then covered the Italian retreat. In the course of the battle the Regiment "Lancieri di Aosta" charged the enemy five times as a whole and a further nine times in squadron or platoon strength. For its conduct in the Battle of Custoza the Regiment "Lancieri di Aosta" became only the second cavalry regiment and the only cavalry regiment in the 19th century to be awarded Italy's highest military honor the Gold Medal of Military Valor, which was affixed to the regiment's standard. After a pause in the war the Italian Army crossed the Po on 7 July and the Regiment "Lancieri di Aosta" rapidly advanced northwards and reached Udine on the 25th of the same month.

In September 1870, the regiment was attached to the 12th Division, which invaded the Papal States from the East and on 20 September fought in the Capture of Rome. On 10 September 1871, the regiment was renamed 6th Cavalry Regiment (Aosta), and on 5 November 1876, Cavalry Regiment "Aosta" (6th). In 1887, the regiment provided personnel and horses for the formation of the Mounted Hunters Squadron, which fought in the Italo-Ethiopian War of 1887–1889. In 1895-96, the regiment provided one officer and 69 enlisted for units deployed to Italian Eritrea for the First Italo-Ethiopian War. On 16 December 1897, the regiment was renamed Regiment "Lancieri di Aosta" (6th).

On 1 October 1909, the regiment ceded its 3rd Squadron to help form the Regiment "Lancieri di Vercelli" (26th). In 1911–12, the regiment provided four officers and 140 enlisted to units deployed for the Italo-Turkish War.

=== World War I ===
At the outbreak of World War I the regiment consisted of a command, a depot, and two cavalry groups, with the I Group consisting of three squadrons and the II Group consisting of two squadrons and a machine gun section. Together with the Regiment "Lancieri di Mantova" (25th) the regiment formed the IV Cavalry Brigade, which was assigned to the 2nd Cavalry Division "Veneto". In April 1916, the 2nd Cavalry Division was dismounted for service in the trenches of the Italian front, however once the Austro-Hungarian Army began the Asiago offensive the division was quickly mounted again and sent to guard the assembly of the Italian 5th Army around Vicenza.

In 1917, the regiment's depot in Ferrara formed the 851st Dismounted Machine Gunners Company as reinforcement for the regiment. On 24 October 1917, the Imperial German Army and Austro-Hungarian Army began the Battle of Caporetto and already on the first day of the battle the German 14th Army broke through the Italian lines at Kobarid. All mounted Italian cavalry regiments were sent forward to cover the retreat of the Italian 2nd Army and 3rd Army from the Isonzo front. The IV Cavalry Brigade was assigned to cover the retreat of the 2nd Army and the IV Cavalry Brigade fought delaying actions along the Torre river near Cividale. On 27 October, the brigade was in danger of being encircled and the brigade's two regiments repeatedly charged enemy units to open an escape route. On 29 October, the Regiment "Lancieri di Aosta" (6th) suffered heavy casualties during delaying actions in the area of Fagagna. The IV Cavalry Brigade then fell back to Toppo, where on 4 November the brigade clashed with enemy vanguards. Afterwards the brigade fell back to the new Italian line along the Piave river.

On 24 October 1918, the Royal Italian Army began the Battle of Vittorio Veneto and on 30 October, the regiment, like all cavalry regiments, was ordered to pursue the retreating Austro-Hungarian armies. On 3 November 1918, the regiment captured the bridge over the Tagliamento river at Latisana and crossed the river as first Italian unit. The next day the regiment charged Austro-Hungarian rearguards at Corgnolo and by afternoon had reached Cervignano, where it was informed of the Armistice of Villa Giusti.

For having captured the bridge at Latisana and for the regiment's rapid pursuit of the fleeing enemy during the Battle of Vittorio Veneto the Regiment "Lancieri di Aosta" (6th) was awarded a Bronze Medal of Military Valor, which was affixed to the regiment's standard.

=== Interwar years ===
After the war the Royal Italian Army disbanded the second groups of all thirty cavalry regiments, while the first groups were reduced to two squadrons. On 21 November 1919, 14 cavalry regiments were disbanded and their groups transferred to 14 of the remaining cavalry regiments. One of the disbanded regiments was the Regiment "Cavalleggeri di Caserta" (17th), whose remaining group was renamed II Squadrons Group "Cavalleggeri di Caserta". Afterwards, the squadrons group, which remained based in Faenza and retained the disbanded regiment's standard, joined the Regiment "Lancieri di Aosta" (6th).

On 20 May 1920, the Royal Italian Army disbanded five additional cavalry regiments, among them the Regiment "Lancieri di Milano" (7th), whose 4th Squadron, which was part of the II Squadrons Group "Cavalleggeri di Roma", was transferred to the Regiment "Lancieri di Aosta" (6th). On the same date, the II Squadrons Group "Cavalleggeri di Caserta" and one of the squadrons group's squadrons were disbanded. Furthermore the Regiment "Lancieri di Aosta" (6th) retired its lances and was renamed Regiment "Cavalleggeri di Aosta". On 1 July 1920, the traditions and standard of the Regiment "Cavalleggeri di Caserta" (17th) were entrusted to the Regiment "Cavalleggeri di Aosta". On 24 May 1925, the standard of the disbanded regiment was transferred to the Shrine of the Flags, which at the time was located in Castel Sant'Angelo, for safekeeping.

On 1 March 1930 the regiment formed the 5th Machine Gunners Squadron equipped with eight heavy machine guns, 15 trucks for the regimental train, twelve motorbikes, and three R/3 radios. On 17 April 1930, the 2nd Fast Division was formed in Bologna. On 15 June 1930 the II Cavalry Brigade, with the regiments Regiment "Genova Cavalleria", Regiment "Cavalleggeri di Aosta", and Regiment "Cavalleggeri Guide" entered the division. In 1932, the regiment moved from Ferrara to Naples. On 8 February 1934, the regiment was renamed Regiment "Lancieri di Aosta". On 1 January 1935, the 2nd Fast Division and II Cavalry Brigade received the name "Emanuele Filiberto Testa di Ferro". On the same date the brigade was reorganized and the Regiment "Lancieri di Aosta" left the division.

=== Second Italo-Ethiopian War ===
In June 1935, in preparation for the Second Italo-Ethiopian War, the regiment formed the III Machine Gunners Squadrons Group "Aosta" and IV Machine Gunners Squadrons Group "Aosta". In August 1935, the two groups, together with the I and II machine gunners squadrons groups formed by the Regiment "Genova Cavalleria" (4th), were deployed to Italian Somaliland. The four squadrons groups fielded a combined 126 officers, 239 non-commissioned officers and 5,421 troops. On 3 October 1935, the Italians invaded Ethiopia. In January 1936, after the defeating the Ethiopians in the Battle of Ganale Doria the four squadrons groups rapidly advanced to Neghelli, which was occupied on 20 January. In the following months the squadrons groups participated in the defeat of the Ethiopian forces in the South of the country, and between June and December 1936 the squadrons groups conquered the Galla-Sidamo region. On 1 January 1937, the four groups were given the honor title "Cavalieri di Neghelli" ("Knights of Neghelli"). In late spring 1937, the III and IV squadrons groups returned to Italy and were disbanded.

For the conquest of the Galla-Sidamo region the III Machine Gunners Squadrons Group "Cavalieri di Neghelli" and IV Machine Gunners Squadrons Group "Cavalieri di Neghelli" were each awarded a Bronze Medal of Military Valor, which today are affixed to standard of the Regiment "Lancieri di Aosta" (6th).

In 1938, for the Italian military intervention in the Spanish Civil War the regiment was ordered to provide a platoon of 64 volunteers. On 7 April 1939, the regiment's command and the I Squadrons Group participated in the Italian invasion of Albania.

=== World War II ===
At the outbreak of World War II the regiment consisted of a command, a command squadron, the 5th Machine Gunners Squadron, and the I and II squadrons groups, which both consisted of two mounted squadrons. The regiment fielded 37 officers, 37 non-commissioned officers, 798 enlisted troops and 818 horses. The regiment was equipped with one car, six motorcycles, 16 trucks, 36 Breda mod. 30 light machine guns, and 12 Fiat mod. 35 heavy machine guns. In fall 1940, the regiment formed, together with the 3rd Regiment "Granatieri di Sardegna e d'Albania" and Regiment "Lancieri di Aosta", the Littoral Grouping, which, as per tradition for Italian grenadier units, was deployed on the extreme right of the Italian front for the planned Italian invasion of Greece.

On 28 October 1940, Italy invaded Greece and the Littoral Grouping quickly reached the Kalamas river in Greece. In November 1940, the Littoral Grouping fought in the Battle of Elaia–Kalamas against Greek forces. During this battle, the Regiment "Lancieri di Aosta" crossed on 10 November behind enemy lines and raided Greek depots at Paramythia. After Axis forces invaded Yugoslavia and Greece, the regiment was sent to Athens and Piraeus on occupation duty. For its conduct in fall of 1940 during the Greco-Italian War the Regiment "Lancieri di Aosta" was awarded a War Cross of Military Valor, which was affixed to the regiment's standard.

During the regiment's stay in Greece the regiment's depot in Naples formed the following units:

- Command 2nd Dismounted Grouping "Lancieri di Aosta"
- VI Machine Gunners Group "Lancieri di Aosta"
- VIII Dismounted Group "Lancieri di Aosta"
- IX Dismounted Group "Lancieri di Aosta"
- XXI Dismounted Group "Lancieri di Aosta"
- XXIII Dismounted Group "Lancieri di Aosta"
- XXVIII Dismounted Group "Lancieri di Aosta"
- XXX Dismounted Group "Lancieri di Aosta"
- XXXI Dismounted Group "Lancieri di Aosta"
- LVII Dismounted Group "Lancieri di Aosta"
- XXVI Road Movement Battalion "Lancieri di Aosta"

In summer 1941, the VI Machine Gunners Group "Lancieri di Aosta" was sent to Libya, where the group fought in the Western Desert Campaign. The group arrived in Tobruk in September 1941 and was attached to the 102nd Motorized Division "Trento". In December 1942, during the retreat after the defeat in the Second Battle of El Alamein, the group was assigned to L Special Brigade. The group remained in the North African theater until its remnants surrendered to Allied Forces at the end of the Tunisian Campaign in April 1943.

In 1942, the regiment remained in Greece and served on garrison between the Corinth Canal and Megara, and later in Lamia and Larissa, where the regiment skirmished with Greek partisans. In the evening of 8 September 1943, the Armistice of Cassibile, which ended hostilities between the Kingdom of Italy and the Anglo-American Allies, was announced by General Dwight D. Eisenhower on Radio Algiers and by Marshal Pietro Badoglio on Italian radio. The news of the armistice reached the Regiment "Lancieri di Aosta" while being deployed between Trikala and Karditsa in Greece. Without orders from the Italian High Command, the regiment's commander Colonel Giuseppe Berti refused German demands to surrender, contacted the British Middle East Command in Cairo, placed his unit under British command, and marched it into the Pindus Mountains, where the regiment, together with the 24th Infantry Division "Pinerolo" joined the Greek partisans of the Greek People's Liberation Army and National Republican Greek League. At the time, the regiment, which had been reinforced with the XXXI Dismounted Group "Lancieri di Aosta" and one battery from the 18th Artillery Regiment "Pinerolo", consisted of 48 officers and 1,718 enlisted, which were equipped with 800 horses, 1,628 carabines, 52 machine pistols, 38 machine guns, 31 bicycles, 6 motorbikes and 15 trucks.

In following weeks the regiment clashed with German forces at Kalabaka and 100 men raided the Luftwaffe's air field at Larissa. On 14 October 1944, ELAS partisans tried to disarm the regiment's troops. In the ensuing fighting 20 Italians were killed and 49 wounded. By nightfall the regiment acquiesced to ELAS' demands and surrendered its weapons. Although the regiment's officers managed to transfer the regiment's standard to a British Royal Navy ship, which transferred the standard to Italy on 28 October 1944, the regiment's remaining personnel was only repatriated in early 1945.

=== Cold War ===
On 15 July 1951, the Italian Army formed the 6th Armored Cavalry Regiment "Lancieri di Aosta" in Bologna. The regiment was assigned to the Infantry Division "Trieste", which also included the 40th Infantry Regiment "Bologna", 82nd Infantry Regiment "Torino", and 21st Field Artillery Regiment. At the time the 6th Armored Cavalry Regiment "Lancieri di Aosta" consisted of a command, a command squadron, and three squadrons groups equipped with a mix of donated US Army armored fighting vehicles (M3 Scout Car, M5 Stuart, M8 Greyhound, M24 Chaffee, M47 Patton).

On 8 November 1951, the regiment moved from Bologna to Reggio Emilia. In October 1954, the Trieste United States Troops and British Element Trieste Force began to depart from the city of Trieste, which was scheduled to return to Italian control on 26 October 1954. On 15 October, in preparation for the handover, the Italian Army formed the Grouping "Trieste" in Udine. The grouping consisted of units drawn from the Infantry Division "Trieste": part of the division's command, the 82nd Infantry Regiment "Torino" and the I Group of the 21st Field Artillery Regiment. On 23 October the Infantry Division "Trieste" was officially disbanded. The 40th Infantry Regiment "Bologna" and the 21st Artillery Regiment were assigned to the newly formed Grouping "Bologna", while the 6th Armored Cavalry Regiment "Lancieri di Aosta" was transferred to the VI Territorial Military Command.

On 4 November 1958, the 6th Armored Cavalry Regiment "Lancieri di Aosta" was renamed Regiment "Lancieri di Aosta" (6th). On 15 September 1964, the regiment and its III Squadrons Group were disbanded. The next day the regiment's I Squadrons Group was renamed Squadrons Group "Lancieri di Aosta", while the regiment's II Squadrons Group was renamed Squadrons Group "Cavalleggeri di Saluzzo". The Squadrons Group "Lancieri di Aosta" then moved from Reggio Emilia to Cervignano del Friuli, where it joined the Infantry Division "Mantova" as the division's reconnaissance unit. The Squadrons Group "Cavalleggeri di Saluzzo" moved the following year from Reggio Emilia to Gradisca d'Isonzo, where it joined the Infantry Division "Folgore" as the division's reconnaissance unit. On 20 May 1965, the Squadrons Group "Lancieri di Aosta" was temporarily entrusted with the standard of the Regiment "Lancieri di Aosta" (6th).

During the 1975 army reform the army disbanded the regimental level and newly independent battalions were granted for the first time their own flags, respectively in the case of cavalry units, their own standard. On 1 October 1975, the Squadrons Group "Lancieri di Aosta" was reorganized and renamed 6th Tank Squadrons Group "Lancieri di Aosta". The squadrons group was assigned to the newly formed Armored Brigade "Vittorio Veneto" and consisted of a command, a command and services squadron, and three tank squadrons equipped with Leopard 1A2 main battle tanks. At the time the squadrons group fielded 434 men (32 officers, 82 non-commissioned officers, and 320 soldiers).

On 12 November 1976, the President of the Italian Republic Giovanni Leone assigned with decree 846 the standard and traditions of the Regiment "Lancieri di Aosta" (6th) to the squadrons group.

For its conduct and work after the 1976 Friuli earthquake the squadrons group was awarded a Bronze Medal of Army Valor, which was affixed to the squadrons group's standard and added to its coat of arms.

On 31 July 1986, the 12th Mechanized Squadrons Group "Cavalleggeri di Saluzzo" joined the Armored Brigade "Vittorio Veneto", which on 30 October of the same year was renamed Mechanized Brigade "Vittorio Veneto".

=== Recent times ===
After the end of the Cold War the Italian Army began to draw down its forces and the Mechanized Brigade "Vittorio Veneto" was one of the first brigades earmarked to be disband on 31 July 1991. Consequently, on 7 May 1991, the 6th Tank Squadrons Group "Lancieri di Aosta" moved from Cervignano del Friuli to Palermo, where it took over the base of the disbanded 141st Motorized Infantry Battalion "Catanzaro" and joined the Motorized Brigade "Aosta". On 2 March 1992, the 6th Tank Squadrons Group "Lancieri di Aosta" lost its autonomy and the next day the squadrons group entered the reformed Regiment "Lancieri di Aosta" (6th). On the same day, the standard and traditions of the Regiment "Lancieri di Aosta" (6th) were transferred from the squadrons group to the regiment. The regiment consisted of a command, a command and services squadron, and a squadrons group with three squadrons with wheeled Centauro tank destroyers.

== Organization ==
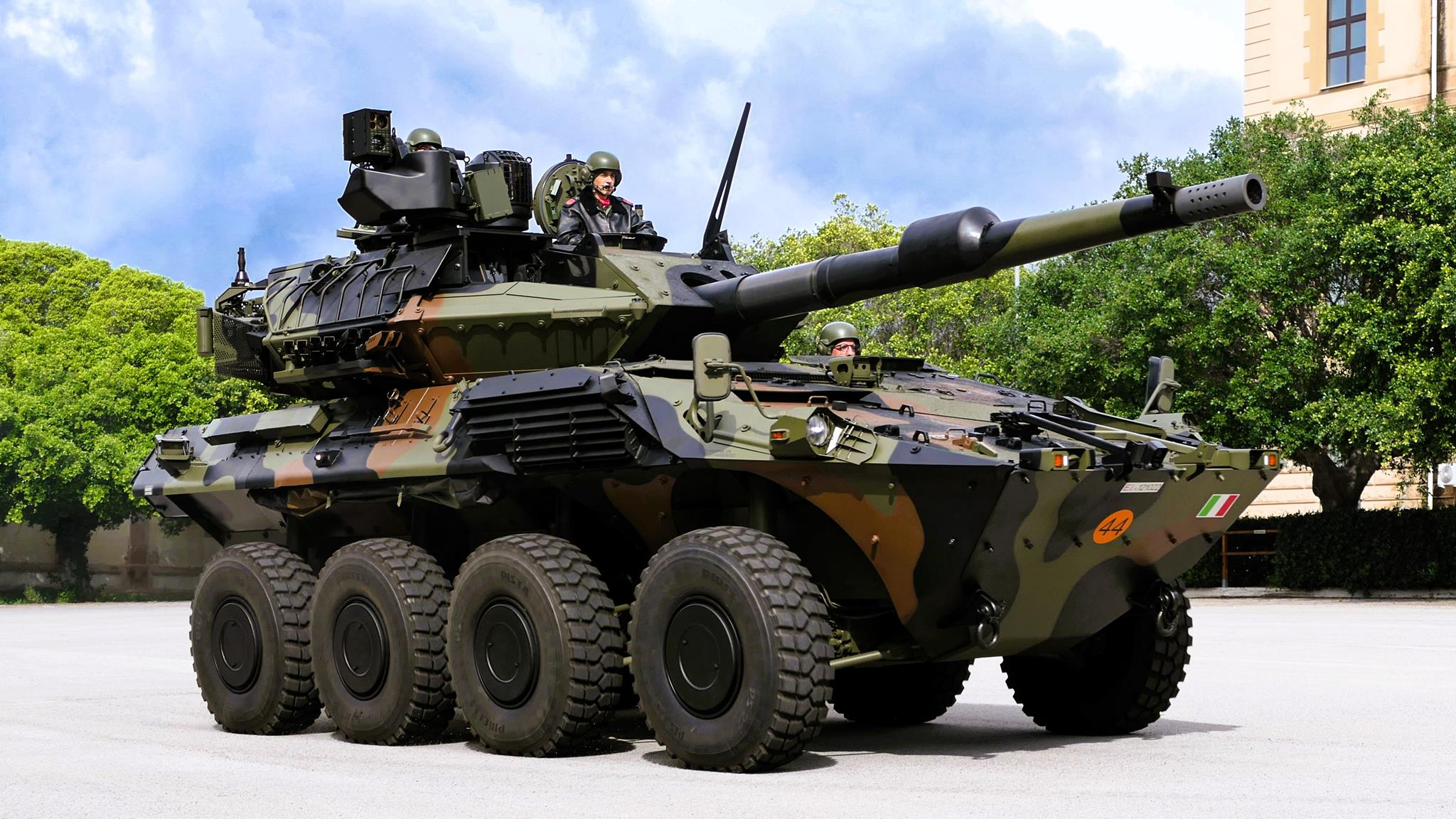
In May 2025 the Regiment "Lancieri di Aosta" (6th) received its first Centauro 2 tank destroyers

Regiment "Lancieri di Aosta" (6th) Centauro 2 tank destroyers during an exercise in October 2026

As of 2025 the Regiment "Lancieri di Aosta" (6th) is organized as follows:

- Regiment "Lancieri di Aosta" (6th), in Palermo
  - Command and Logistic Support Squadron
  - 1st Reconnaissance Squadrons Group
    - 1st Reconnaissance Squadron
    - 2nd Reconnaissance Squadron
    - 3rd Reconnaissance Squadron
    - Heavy Armored Squadron

The three reconnaissance squadrons are equipped with Lince vehicles and Centauro tank destroyers, which are scheduled to be replaced by Lince 2 vehicles and Freccia EVO Reconnaissance vehicles. In May 2025, the regiment's Heavy Armored Squadron became the army's second squadron to be equipped with Centauro 2 tank destroyers.

== See also ==
- Mechanized Brigade "Aosta"
