= Alessandro Bettoni Cazzago =

Italian equestrian

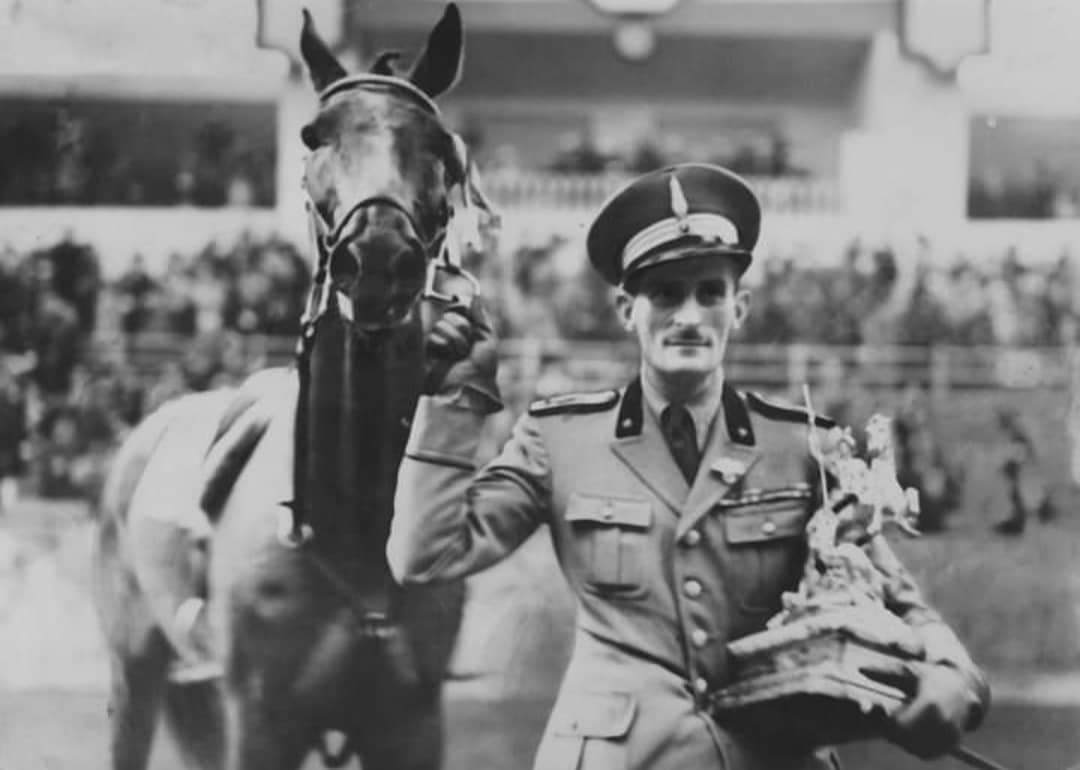

Personal information
- Nationality: Italian
- Born: 17 November 1892 Brescia, Italy
- Died: 28 April 1951 (aged 58) Rome, Italy

Sport
- Sport: Equestrian

Alessandro Bettoni Cazzago (17 November 1892 – 28 April 1951) was an Italian cavalry officer and equestrian. He competed at the 1928 Summer Olympics and the 1948 Summer Olympics.

He was born into a noble family from Brescia, the son of Senator Federico Bettoni Cazzago. After completing his classical studies at the Royal Carlo Alberto College in Moncalieri, he enlisted in the Royal Italian Army as a cavalry officer. He fought with the rank of Captain during the First World War, participating in the battles of the Isonzo on the Karst Plateau and being awarded one Silver and two Bronze Medals of Military Valor. In 1920 he was assigned the 3rd Regiment "Savoia Cavalleria", of which in 1942 he became commander, with the rank of colonel, replacing Guglielmo Barbò. He participated in the Italian campaign on the Eastern Front with the CSIR, and on 24 August 1942 he commanded the Charge of Izbushensky, for which he was awarded another silver medal for military valor and the Military Order of Savoy.

After the Armistice of Cassibile he joined the Italian Resistance in his native province, providing support to the "Green Flames" Partisan Brigades. Suspected by the fascists, he went into hiding but on 22 August 1944 he was arrested and interned in Lumezzane. In April 1945 he was freed and appointed military commander of Brescia, as well as delegate of the Corpo Volontari della Libertà at the Allied Command. He then resumed service within the Army but resigned in 1947, being a staunch monarchist and having refused to take an oath of allegiance to the Italian Republic.

He died in Rome in 1951, a few hours after taking part in the horse show dedicated to him in Piazza di Siena.
