= Guglielmo Barbò =

Italian general

- Born: 11 August 1888; Milan, Kingdom of Italy
- Died: 14 December 1944 (aged 56); Flossenbürg, Nazi Germany
- Military career
- Allegiance: Kingdom of Italy
- Branch: Royal Italian Army
- Service years: 1909–1944
- Rank: Brigadier General
- Commands: 1st Cavalry Regiment "Nizza Cavalleria"; 3rd Cavalry Regiment "Savoia Cavalleria"; Horse Troops Groupment; Pinerolo Cavalry Application School
- Conflicts: World War I; Battles of the Isonzo; Battle of Vittorio Veneto; World War II; Battle of the Western Alps; Axis invasion of Yugoslavia; Italian campaign on the Eastern Front
- Awards: Silver Medal of Military Valor (twice); War Cross of Military Valor; War Merit Cross; Military Order of Savoy; Order of the Crown of Italy; Order of Saints Maurice and Lazarus; Iron Cross Second Class

Guglielmo Barbò, 8th Count of Casalmorano (Milan, 11 August 1888 – Flossenbürg, 14 December 1944) was an Italian general during World War II, most notable for commanding Italian cavalry troops on the Eastern Front.

== Biography ==
He was born in Milan on 11 August 1888, the son of Marquis Gaetano Barbò of Casalmorano and of Fanny Barbiano of the Princes of Belgioiso d'Este. Starting from 26 October 1905 he attended the Military School of Rome, and on 5 November 1907 he entered the Royal Military Academy of Infantry and Cavalry in Modena, graduating on 19 September 1909 with the rank of cavalry second lieutenant; he immediately started to attend the Pinerolo Cavalry Application School in order to complete his training. In November 1911 he was assigned to the 1st Cavalry Regiment "Nizza Cavalleria", being promoted to lieutenant on October 3, 1912.

After the Kingdom of Italy entered World War I, on 5 June 1915 he left with his regiment for the Isonzo front, where in May 1916 he earned a Silver Medal of Military Valor for having distinguished himself in the fighting in Monfalcone. On 9 July 1916 he was promoted to captain and was transferred to a bombardier unit of the 30th Field Artillery Regiment. On 16 September 1917 he assumed command of a squadron of the 3rd Regiment "Savoia Cavalleria"; one year later he participated in the battle of Vittorio Veneto, being among the first to re-enter Udine in November 1918, occupying the town for 24 hours with just forty men and taking six hundred Austro-Hungarian prisoners, a feat for which he was awarded another silver medal for military valor. At the end of the war he remained in the newly occupied north-eastern territories, and with the position of commander of the 3rd Squadron of "Savoia Cavalleria", he served first in Trieste, then in Terranova and subsequently in Bistena.

On 1 April 1919 he returned to the Milan garrison, after which he served from 28 January to 5 August 1920 at the Inter-Allied Commission for the Control of the Plebiscite for the territory of Hallstein, in East Prussia. On 7 April 1920 he married in Turin Miss Maddalena Pia of the Marquises Fracassi Ratti Mentone of Torre Rossano, with whom he had a daughter, Francesca Maria. On 5 December 1926, after promotion to major, he returned to the 1st Regiment "Nizza Cavalleria" as Squadron Group commander; on April 7, 1927, he was appointed First Adjutant to the regimental commander, holding this position until February 15, 1929. On 9 May of the same year he became lieutenant colonel, and on 16 October 1932 he was assigned to the Command of the Turin Army Corps, before passing on 23 September 1934 to the 12th "Cavalleggeri di Saluzzo" Regiment as commander of a Squadron Group.

On 10 November 1935 he assumed the post of commander of the autonomous dismounted squadrons of Caltanissetta, and on 26 January 1936 he was appointed Commander of a Squadron Group of the 10th Cavalry Regiment "Cavalleggeri di Vittorio Emanuele". On 22 September 1937, having been promoted to colonel, he was assigned to the headquarters of the Army Corps of Rome. On 1 April 1938 he assumed command of the 1st Cavalry Regiment "Nizza Cavalleria", taking over from General Giorgio Calvi di Bergolo.

In June 1940, after Italy's entry into the Second World War, Barbò participated with his regiment in the battle of the Western Alps; in April 1941 he participated in the invasion of Yugoslavia. On 1 October 1941 he was transferred to service at the Army Corps Command, and on the following November 27 he was assigned to the Italian Expeditionary Corps in Russia (CSIR), assuming command of the 3rd Regiment "Savoia Cavalleria" on December 9 of the same year and participating in the advance of Italian troops in Ukraine.

On March 15, 1942, he was replaced in command of "Savoia Cavalleria" by Colonel Alessandro Bettoni Cazzago, assuming command of the Horse Troops Groupment (Raggruppamento Truppe a Cavallo, also known as Raggruppamento Barbò after him; composed of the Savoia Cavalleria Regiment, the Lancers of Novara and the 3rd Horse Artillery Regiment) of the CSIR. On April 15 he was promoted to brigadier general, being awarded the Iron Cross Second Class by the German command. He then distinguished himself in August of the same year, during the defensive battle on the Don, for which he was decorated with the Knight's Cross of the Military Order of Savoy. On 10 November 1942 he was made available to the XXXV Army Corps, being repatriated a week later, assigned from 17 December of the same year to the Territorial Defense Command of Turin. On 1 April 1943 he became commander of the Pinerolo Cavalry Application School.

Following the Armistice of Cassibile Barbò started negotiations with the German military authorities, but on 12 September 1943 the School passed under German control and all its personnel and cadets were loaded on a train to be interned in Germany, having refused any collaboration. On the following night, however, Barbò managed to escape from the train and joined the Piedmontese Resistance. He was captured on August 16, 1944, and imprisoned in the San Vittore Prison in Milan, before being transferred to the Bolzano Transit Camp from where on September 5 he was sent as a "political prisoner" to the Flossenbürg concentration camp, with Transport 81. There he died from pleuritis on 14 December 1944.
