= Charge of the Savoia Cavalleria at Izbushensky =

Cavalry charge in World War II

Coordinates: 49°56′12″N 42°33′24″E

Charge of Izbushensky
- Part of Case Blue in the Eastern Front of World War II
Date	24 August 1942
Location	Izbushensky Khutor, Soviet Union
Result	Italian victory

Belligerents
Italy	Soviet Union

Commanders and leaders
(Fascist Italy) Alessandro, Count Bettoni Cazzago	(Soviet Union) Serafim Petrovich Merkulov

Strength
700	2,500

Casualties and losses
84 casualties: 32 dead 52 wounded 100+ horses killed	Italian reports: 150 killed 300 wounded 600 prisoners Soviet reports: for the entire 304th division on 24 August: 184 killed 82 wounded

The Charge of the "Savoia Cavalleria" at Izbushensky was a clash between the Italian cavalry Regiment "Savoia Cavalleria" (3rd) and the Soviet 812th Rifle Regiment (304th Rifle Division) that took place on 24 August 1942, near the hamlet (khutor) of Izbushensky (Избушенский), close to the junction between the Don and Khopyor rivers. Though a minor skirmish in the theatre of operation of the Eastern Front, the Izbushensky charge had great propaganda resonance in Italy and it is still remembered as one of the last significant cavalry charges in history.

== Background ==
On 20 August, the Soviets launched an offensive on the Don river. The Italian 2nd Infantry Division Sforzesca was unable to withstand the enemy attack and in two days it was routed. The Regiment "Savoia Cavalleria" (3rd) under command of Colonel Alessandro, Count Bettoni Cazzago, was sent as a relief force in the area, with orders to occupy "objective spot height 213,5". During the evening of 23 August, it set camp 1,000 meters short of its objective, ready to occupy it the next morning. During the night, two battalions (first and second) of the Soviet 812th Rifle Regiment deployed on the objective. They entrenched themselves in an arc facing the Italian camp about 1,000 meters wide, waiting until sunrise to attack.

== Charge ==
On 24 August at 3:30 am, an Italian mounted patrol, sent to recon the objective, made contact with the Soviets. The Soviets, having lost the element of surprise, opened fire on the entire line. With the camp under fire, Bettoni had no choice but to order, as a last resort, a cavalry charge with drawn sabers and hand grenades against entrenched infantry. While the horse drawn artillery (so called "flying batteries" or voloire in Piemontese) quickly deployed its four pieces and opened fire, the machine guns deployed at the front of the Italian camp and started firing back. Alessandro Bettoni then ordered the 2nd squadron (over 100 horsemen) to attack the Soviet left flank. Under the command of Captain De Leone, the squadron began a winding maneuver through a gorge, succeeding in engaging the Soviets at the left end of the front, outflanking it and storming it longitudinally with drawn sabers and hand grenades.

Corporal Lolli, unable to draw, as his saber was stuck in its sheath, charged holding high a hand grenade; Trumpeter Carenzi, having to handle both trumpet and pistol, unintentionally shot his own horse in the head. Some horses, even though riddled by bullets, would keep galloping for hundreds of meters, squirting blood at every beat, suddenly collapsing only a while after their actual death. After having crossed just about half of the Soviet line the strength of the squadron was already reduced by half, and the commander himself was grounded.

Realizing that the 2nd squadron was taking heavy casualties, and perceiving through his binoculars that the Soviet riflemen, after the horsemen had jumped over their holes, would get up and shoot at their backs, Colonel Bettoni ordered the 4th squadron to dismount and launch a frontal attack. This would allow the 2nd squadron to regroup behind Soviet lines and perform a return charge. The 4th squadron was led by Captain Silvano Abba, who was killed while leading his men. He was posthumously awarded the Gold Medal of Military Valor. Once the 2nd squadron was back, its commander urged a new attack. This was performed by 3rd squadron, led by the impatient Captain Marchio, who rushed frontally at the Soviets without taking the detour through the gorge at the side of the battlefield. Major Alberto Litta Modignani decided on his own accord to join the 3rd squadron charge, together with the remaining dozen horsemen of the command.

All action ceased by 9:30 am, six hours after the engagement had commenced.

== Aftermath ==
According to Italian sources, 32 cavalrymen died, including the commanders of the 3rd and 4th squadrons, 52 were wounded. Well over 100 horses were also lost. From the Soviet side, 304th Rifle Division battle report No. 2 from 24 August preliminary evaluates Italian losses for that day as up to 500 dead. The Soviets, by Italian records, left behind 150 dead, 300 wounded, 600 prisoners (including some Mongolian platoons equipped with Italian uniforms, which had been taken from the Sforzesca division), 4 cannons, 10 mortars and 50 machine guns. From the Soviet perspective, 304th Rifle Division operational report No. 70 from the early hours of 25 August tolls the losses taken by the whole division for the previous day at 184 killed and 82 wounded.

Shortly afterwards German liaison cavalry officers arrived. They were deployed at the left of the Savoia and they had witnessed everything from the neighbouring heights. They expressed their wonder and admiration for the anachronistic episode to Alessandro, saying: "Colonel, these kinds of things, we cannot do them anymore".

After removing the wounded and the dead, the battlefield remained covered with dead horses. The relatively high casualties that would have resulted from pursuing the Soviet troops would have had the effect of precluding the launching of any more charges, should the need arise. Given this consideration, Commander Bettoni decided not to pursue the Soviets, who therefore retained a solid foothold on the west bank of the Don River. Nonetheless, the "Izbushensky Charge", as it was subsequently named, temporarily relieved the whole area of Soviet pressure, delayed the full Soviet attack on Tschebotarewskij by 24 hours, and likely bought time for the routed "Sforzesca" division to seek safety. By 27 August, however, the 304th Rifle Division was on the offensive once again.

The bold action of the Italian troops was repaid by adding the Gold Medal of Military Valor to the regiment standard and by awarding the medal to Captain Silvano Abba and Major Alberto Litta Modignani, both of whom had died in action. Another 54 Silver Medals of Military Valor and 49 war crosses were also awarded.

A much-loved and much-honoured survivor of the Izbushensky charge was Albino, a horse which, though blinded in the battle, lived until 1960.

== Media representations ==
In September 1942 the "Istituto Luce" dispatched a film crew in order to take staged footage of the Savoia in action. The only original pictures were shot by Cpt. Abbà right before starting the attack with the 4th squadron. His camera was found on his body and was returned to his mother by 2nd ltn. Compagnoni. They show, from far away, the dust of the 2nd squadron about to end the first swipe.

In 1952 the movie Carica Eroica was made, directed by Francesco De Robertis and based on the Izbushensky Charge.

== Bibliography ==
- Lucio Lami, Isbuscenskij, l'ultima carica, Mursia, Milano, 1970.
- Giorgio Vitali, Trotto, galoppo...caricat! – storia del Raggruppamento truppe a cavallo. Russia 1942–1943, Mursia, Milano, 1985
