= Honorary colonel =

may refer to:

- Colonel (Canada)#Honorary ranks and appointments
- Colonel commandant § United Kingdom
- Colonel (United Kingdom)#Honorary Colonel
- Colonel (U.S. honorary title)

see also:

- Colonel-in-chief
