= Izbushensky =

Izbushensky Избушенский
- Khutor
- Location within Volgograd Oblast Location within Russia
- Coordinates: 49°32′N 42°25′E
- Country: Russia
- Region: Volgograd Oblast
- District: Serafimovichsky District
- Time zone: UTC+4:00

Izbushensky (Russian: Избушенский) is a rural locality (a khutor) in Ust-Khopyorskoye Rural Settlement, Serafimovichsky District, Volgograd Oblast, Russia. The population was 14 as of 2010.

During World War 2 it was the sight of the famous Charge of the Savoia Cavalleria at Izbushensky, when an Italian cavalry division charged on horseback against their Soviet enemies.

== Geography ==
Izbushensky is located 42 km southwest of Serafimovich (the district's administrative centre) by road. Rybny is the nearest rural locality.
