= La Bataille de Valmy =

Board game

La Bataille de Valmy is a board wargame published by Jeux Descartes in 1981 that simulates the Battle of Valmy.

== Background ==
In 1792, European leaders were worried that the French Revolution that had toppled Louis XVI from his throne would infect their countries as well. The First Coalition was formed to bring the Revolution down, and in September 1792, the Duke of Brunswick with 34,000 Prussian soldiers advanced upon Paris. Two French armies led by Generals François Kellermann and Charles Dumouriez stopped the advance near the northern village of Valmy in Champagne-Ardenne. The two sides engaged in an exchange of long-distance artillery as the Prussians advanced towards the French positions. At this stage, to everyone's surprise, Brunswick broke off the Prussian attack and retreated from the field, giving the Revolutionaries their first major military victory.

== Gameplay ==
La Bataille de Valmy is a Napoleonic board wargame for two players in which one player controls the French forces and the other the Prussian forces. There is no expectation in the rules that Prussia will retreat in the face of French artillery, so the players can try to discover who might have won the battle had the Duke of Brunswick pressed on.

The basic rules, which are based on the system from Napoleon's Last Battles (SPI, 1976), are not complex, taking up only 8 pages. Units that enter an opposing unit's zone of control are obligated to fight. There are also rules for artillery, cavalry charges, demoralization and infantry formations. The turn order is a simple "I Go, You Go" system, where the Prussian player moves and then engages in combat. The French player then has the same opportunities.

More advanced rules allow for randomly variable reinforcements; leadership command, where units must be within a certain distance of a leader in order to receive orders to move forward and attack; and unit disorganization following skirmish.

=== Victory conditions ===
The game lasts for twenty turns. At the end of the game, each player adds up the strength points of enemy units eliminated. Whoever has the greater total is the winner.

== Publication history ==
La Bataille de Valmy was designed by Jean-Jacques Petit, who carefully researched the battle before creating the game. (Ten history texts are listed in the game's bibliography.) The game was published by Jeux Descartes in 1981.

== Reception ==
In Issue 5 of the French games magazine Casus Belli, François Marcela-Froideval was impressed, writing, "Valmy is an excellent achievement in terms of gameplay and historical achievement." Marcela-Froideval concluded, "Its realism is the fruit of the time spent in research, documentation, and also successive tests and refinement of the game by the author."

In Issue 8 of the same magazine, Henri Gregoire was impressed by most of the components, saying, "The map is magnificent, the production is excellent and I congratulate the entire team from the creator to the model maker to the technicians." His only disappointment was the cardboard counters, which he thought were too thin and difficult to pick up. Gregoire examined the game mechanics and commented that the game was "an excellent achievement in terms of playability and historical achievement. This realism is the fruit of the time spent in research, documentation, and also successive tests and refinements of the game by the author." Gregoire concluded, "Valmy is a well-designed simulation with classic rules that provide a pleasant game, and with a superb map."

In Issue 13 of the French games magazine Jeux & Stratégie, Michel Brassinne thought the game was perfect for new players, pointing out, "The rules have the merit of being both short and clear; which is far from always being the case. Consequently Valmy can be quickly implemented and constitutes a happy initiation to classic wargames."
