= Demi-brigade =

Military formation

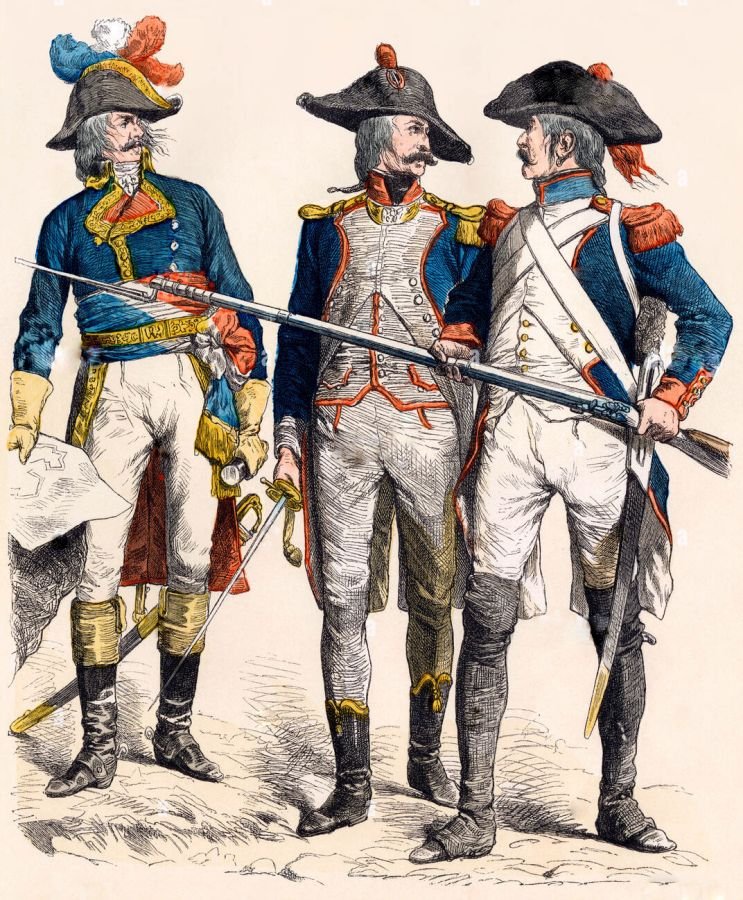
General, junior officer and soldier of a demi-brigade of the French Revolutionary Army in 1795

A demi-brigade (French pronunciation: [dəmi bʁiɡad]; English: half-brigade) is a military formation used by the French Army since the French Revolutionary Wars. The demi-brigade amalgamated the various infantry organizations of the French Revolutionary infantry into a single unit. Each one was headed by a chef de brigade.

The term "demi-brigade" was chosen to avoid the ancien régime connotations of the term "regiment". Napoleon ordered the term to be abandoned in 1803, and the demi-brigades were renamed regiments. The term was reused by certain later units in the French army, such as the 13th Demi-Brigade of the Foreign Legion, the only permanent demi-brigade in the modern French Army.

== Background ==
The French Legislative Assembly voted to declare war on Austria on 20 April 1792, and Prussia joined the war against France. 1792 ended well for France, having conquered the Austrian Netherlands (Belgium) and parts of Germany. However, by early 1793, having guillotined King Louis XVI on 21 January, France found itself at war with a coalition including Great Britain, the German States, the Kingdom of Piedmont-Sardinia, and Spain in addition to Austria and Prussia.

By mid-1793, France had lost all the conquests of 1792, was fighting on multiple fronts, and threatened with invasion. In an effort to reverse the setbacks, France took a number of measures. In late August 1793, instigated by Lazare Carnot, France introduced the levée en masse, a mass conscription of young unmarried men. Also in late August, a law was passed to amalgamate the infantry, which saw the formation of Demi-brigades, a concept that would be made permanent in 1794, when the first demi-brigades were raised under the Revolutionary Army.

One division was made up of three brigades and one brigade was made up of 3 demi-brigades, each made up of 3 battalions and the headquarters unit.

== Demi-brigade ==
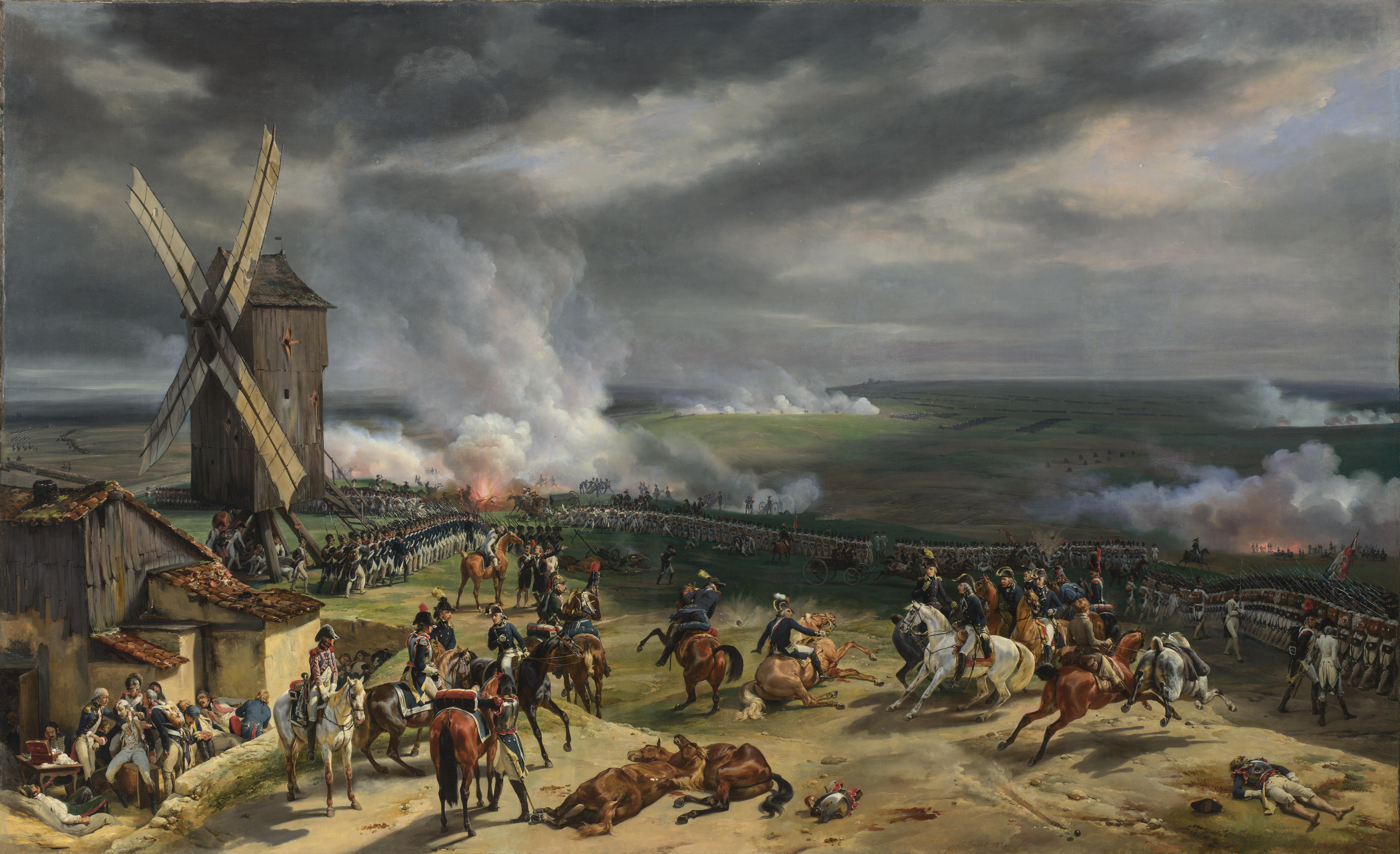
French troops at the Battle of Valmy in 1792. To the right are white-coated regulars from the Royal Army, while to the left are blue-coated National Guardsmen.

The main problem faced by the French Revolution infantry was a lack of unity. The Army included three main types of infantry, all with different uniforms, organizations, equipment, and rates of pay:

1. regular infantry inherited from the French Royal Army, relatively well trained and equipped, dressed in white uniforms and wearing Tarleton helmets
2. National Guard units, less well-trained or equipped, with blue uniforms
3. fédéré volunteer battalions, poorly trained and equipped, with no uniform other than a red phrygian cap and the cockade of France

The variations between units created logistical problems, and animosity (due to different rates of pay) among units.

The purpose of the Demi-brigade was to blend all three formations into a single unit, with identical equipment, organization, pay, and uniforms. A Demi-brigade consisted of three infantry battalions: one battalion of regulars (from old Royal regiments), and two battalions of either volunteers or national guards. Each battalion had the same organization of one company of grenadiers (heavy infantry) and eight companies of fusiliers (regular infantry). On paper, a Demi-brigade would have 2,437 men and four six-pounder cannons.

The levée en masse had swelled the ranks of the French army, so by August 1794 over a million men (1,075,000) were under arms. The Demi-brigade created a streamlined and simple method of organizing the infantry. Due to the current war situation, Demi-brigades were not formed until early 1794. Separate Demi-brigades were organised as line infantry (Demi-brigade de Bataille, 1792–96 and Demi-brigade d'Infanterie de Ligne, 1796–1803) and light infantry (Demi-brigade d'Infanterie Légère); all lacked uniformity in either weapons or equipment. As the French Revolutionary Wars progressed, demi-brigades were issued with specific coloured uniform jackets.

By late 1794, France had completed the re-conquest of the Austrian Netherlands and Rhineland of Germany. The Demi-brigade survived the transition of the French government to the French Directory in 1795, the ending of the First Coalition in 1797 after Napoleon's successful campaigns in Italy, renewed conflict with a Second Coalition, and Napoleon seizing power in 1799 to create the French Consulate.

== End of the Revolutionary Demi-brigades ==
Peace was restored under the Treaty of Amiens in 1802, and Napoleon ordered the reinstatement of the historic term "régiment" in 1803. The Demi-brigades were renamed as regiments.

The term has been revived for various French Army units since the Napoleonic period. Perhaps the most famous unit to be termed a Demi-Brigade is the 13th Foreign Legion Demi-Brigade, the only permanent demi-brigade in the modern French Army.

== Demi-brigades in Poland ==
In the Second Polish Republic, demi-brigades (Polish: Półbrygady) were organized in the ranks of Border Protection Corps (in 1927) and National Defence units (from 1937).
