= Maléfices =

French horror tabletop role-playing game

Maléfices (French for "evil acts" or "hexes"), subtitled "The role-playing game with the scent of sulphur", was published by Jeux Descartes in 1985 as the first original French-language horror role-playing game. Three editions, 13 adventures and a bestiary have been published, and a fourth edition is being developed.

== Description ==
Maléfices is set in France during the years of the Belle Époque (1870–1914), and is a mixture of horror fantasy and Jules Verne technology. All player characters belong to le club Pythagore (The Pythagorean Club) in Paris, which is designed to resemble Golden Dawn, the historical British secret society that was devoted to the study and practice of the occult, metaphysics, and paranormal activities. As members of the club, player characters are recruited to go on quests or investigate unusual happenings.

== Components (1st and 2nd editions) ==
The boxed set contains:

- 56-page rule book
- 48-page scenario booklet, contains two adventures: La Malédiction de Fontevrault ("The Curse at Fontevrault") and Une Etrange Maison de Poupées ("A Strange Dollhouse").
- gamemaster's screen
- blank character sheets
- two ten-sided dice
- 20-card proprietary tarot deck
- 21 two-sided cardboard character figures with plastic bases

The rules cover character creation, system mechanics, combat rules, magic rules, and the creation and use of non-player characters, animals and supernatural creatures.

Historical background material is divided into three parts: "France between 1870 and 1914"; a 4-page timeline of French history; and "Witchcraft, Beliefs and Superstition in Nineteenth-century France."

=== Third edition ===
The third edition is contained in a single book that describes a great deal of historical and sociological information, as well as police services, investigative and forensic techniques of the period, the Law, procedures of trial and judgement, and typical sentences and punishments. It also includes two adventures, La Jeune Fille et la Mort ("The Maiden and Death"), and L'Enfant de Colère ("The Child of Wrath").

== Character generation ==
The player first picks a profession for the player character; female characters are limited to professions that were socially acceptable during La Belle Epoque. The player then rolls dice to determine age and Constitution. These will result in scores between 1–20 for four physical attributes (Strength, Dexterity, Education, and Perception).

The player divides a pool of twenty points between two spiritual attributes (Reason and Faith), although neither can have a starting score lower than 6. In general, Faith (because you believe something is real) protects against the effects of the occult and paranormal. Meanwhile Reason (because you don't believe something is real) resists fear.

The gamemaster secretly rolls dice to determine a score of 5–20 for the character's paranormal attribute (Flow). This is modified by the character's thresholds (bonuses) in White Magic ("good" spells), Black Magic ("evil" spells) and Other Magic (psychic powers and perception of the spiritual realm); otherwise the three concentrations have a base value of "0". The Game Master keeps the Flow Score and its modifiers secret from the player, so they are unaware or unsure of how good or bad they are until they try using it. It contributes to the game's theme that magic is dangerous and not to be trifled with.

Finally the player draws five tarot cards (the "Hand of Destiny"), four of which the player can see; the fifth is secretly recorded by the gamemaster. These cards modify the character's attributes by granting bonuses or inflicting penalties that affect the player character attempts to use their abilities. For example The Archangel and The Priest give bonuses to Faith and makes casting White Magic easier, The Devil and The Sorcerer give bonuses to Reason and makes casting Black Magic easier, and The Great Grimoire gives bonuses to Flow, Faith and Reason.

== Gameplay ==
The game uses a pair of ten-sided dice and a proprietary deck of tarot cards to resolve actions. A region-coded chart (the "Table of Levels") indicates the range of percentile numbers the player has to roll within to achieve a positive result, and the level of success or failure that resulted from their action. The ranges are graded by letter, like a report card. The Success result is graded from "A" (Perfect), "B" (Very Good), "C" (Good) and "D" (Average). Failure results are graded from "A" (Recoverable), "B" (Not Serious), "C" (Serious), "D" (Very Serious) and "E" (Critical Failure). So even a success or failure is by degrees, rather than an absolute Pass/Fail. An Average Success barely makes it, and a Recoverable Failure can succeed if the player wants to do so at a disadvantage or with a complication.

The magic system uses a reverse result. The objective is to roll a Failure result rather than a success, as if the roll was being made by The Devil. (For example, a Perfect result leads to blowback or terrible side-effects, while a Critical Failure result has no complications.)

The results are modified by drawing tarot cards. The Fool gives the player good luck, nullifying a negative or fatal result. Death gives bad luck, giving a negative result at a critical time of the gamemaster's choosing.

=== Fourth Edition ===
The fourth edition currently being developed will use twenty-sided dice instead of ten-sided dice. There is also a redesigned 22-card tarot deck with different artwork.

== Publication history ==
Maléfices was created by Michel Gaudo and Guillaume Rohmer, and published by Jeux Descartes in 1985 as a boxed set with artwork by Didier Guiserix and Gilles Lautussier. Eight adventures and a bestiary were also published.

In 1988, Jeux Descartes published a revised second edition and three more adventures.

In 2006, a greatly expanded third edition in the form of 290-page softcover book and two more adventures were published by Editions du Club Pythagore. The third edition was reprinted in 2007 by Asmodée Éditions.

In 2016 Arkhane Asylum Publishing acquired the rights to Maléfices from Michel Gaudo. In October 2018 they were crowdfunded through Ulule to begin work on a new version of the game and new adventures. They also planned to reissue revised versions of the old supplements and adventures. In 2021, with work on the 4th edition still underway, Arkhane published the first issue of L'Étoile du Matin (The Morning Star), a periodical with articles designed to support adventures that will be developed in the future.

== Reception ==
Léo Sigrann, writing for Chroniques d'Altaride, commented on the mix of horror and Belle Epoque steampunk, saying "the fantastic and the Jules Verne technologies coexist in exciting and tortuous scenarios." He also called the use of the tarot deck to modify action resolutions "one of the unique originalities of the game." Sigrann concluded that the game was "a treat for the gamemaster and the players!"

In his 2014 book Game Magic: A Designer's Guide to Magic Systems in Theory and Practice, Jeff Howard notes that "the supernatural forces in the game are hidden, almost invisible, to the point that players may never actually encounter a demon even though the entire game is built around implications of diabolical influence. The metaphor of a faint 'odor of sulphur' is a fascinating design goal."

Olivier Caïra counted Maléfices among those role-playing games which introduced more complex narratives into the genre in the 1980s.

== Other reviews and commentary ==
- Casus Belli #30 (January 1986, p.58)
- Casus Belli #42 (December 1987, p.30)
- Jeux et Stratégie #37
- Backstab #48

== List of related publications ==
=== Modules ===
- No.1 Le drame de la rue des Récollets ("A Tragedy in the Street of the Recollects") [Jeux Descartes 1985 (1st edition)] by Michel Gaudo. (24 pages)
- No.2 L'énigmatique carnet du Capitaine Pop Plinn ("The Puzzling Notebook of Captain Pop Plinn") [Jeux Descartes 1985 (1st edition)] by Hervé Fontanières
- No.3 Délivrez-nous du mal ("Deliver Us from Evil...") [Jeux Descartes 1986] by Hervé Fontanières
- No.4 Les Brasiers ne s'éteignent jamais ("The Fires Never Burn Out") [Jeux Descartes 1986] by Michel Gaudo (48 pages)
- No.5 Le dompteur de Volcans ("The Tamer of Volcanoes") [Jeux Descartes 1986] by Michel Gaudo
- No.6 Enchères sous Pavillon noir ("Bidding on a Black Banner") [Jeux Descartes 1987] by Pascal Gaudo
- No.7 La musique adoucit les meurtres ("Music Makes Murders Much Sweeter") [Jeux Descartes 1987] by Michel Gaudo. A sequel to "A Strange Dollhouse".
- No.8 Le montreur d'ombres ("The Caster of Shadows") [Jeux Descartes 1987] by Hervé Fontanières (56 pages)
- No.9 Folies viennoises (A pun meaning either "Viennese Cabaret" or "Viennese Madness") [Jeux Descartes 1988] by Daniel Bilous & Nicole Bilous
- No.10 Cœur cruel ("Cruel Heart") [Jeux Descartes 1988] by Hervé Fontanières
- No.11 Le voile de Kali ("The Veil of Kali") [Jeux Descartes 1994] by Michel Gaudo & Pascal Gaudo (112 pages)
- No.12 Danse macabre ("The Grim Dance") [Editions du Club Pythagore 2004] by Daniel Dugourd (76 pages)
- No.13 La cornemuse du vieux Jeremiah ("Old Jeremiah's Bagpipes") [Editions du Club Pythagore 2005] by Daniel Dugourd
- Les Chasses du Comte Lassary ("The Hunts of Count Lassary") [1991] by Michel Gaudo.

=== Supplements ===
- À la lisière de la nuit ("At the Edge of Night") [Jeux Descartes 1986 (1st edition rules); 104 pages] by Hervé Fontanières, Michel Gaudo & Guillaume Rohmer. A collection of stories and quotes about magic and the occult rather than a list of Vancian spells, along with some rules.
- Le Bestiaire ("The Bestiary") [Jeux Descartes 1988 (2nd edition rules)] by Michel Gaudo & Pascal Gaudo. A series of legends, stories and thematic quotes about animals and monsters rather than concrete statistics to stimulate the imagination of the gamemaster. It also repeats some of the tables and rules from A la Lisière de la Nuit.
- CatéSchisme (a portmanteau word pun, combining the words catechism and schism.) [Editions du Club Pythagore 2007 (3rd edition rules)] by Olivier Babarit, Daniel Dugourd, Michel Gaudo, & Jean-Philippe Palanchini. A 4-panel gamemaster's screen with thematic artwork by Gilles Lautussier on the obverse side and important tables on the reverse. It also comes with a revised full-color deck of 22 tarot cards and a 32-page softcover booklet containing new rules and three in-universe essays. Superstitions et Diableries ("Superstitions and Devilries") [8 pages] is an essay by a Catholic priest who decries Spiritualism as a heretical belief system that is undermining the authority of the Church. It also documents the origins of the Spiritualist movement and its practices. Les Forces Invisibles ("The Invisible Forces") [8 pages] is a first-hand account of a Spiritualist seance by a scientist who is trying to understand what he saw by using rationality and scientific inquiry. Sciences Secrètes des Initiés ("The Secret Knowledge of the Initiates") [10 pages] is a question and answer session being given by an occultist named Doctor Theobald to an occult group called the Veils of Isis. The lecturer believes that occultism is superior to both modern science and mysticism.

== See also ==
- Paris in the Belle Époque
- Daniel Dugourd, "Maléfices : odeur de soufre sur l'École des chartes", Olivier Caïra (ed.) and Jérôme Larré (ed.), Jouer avec l'histoire, Pinkerton Press, 2009 (ISBN 978-2-9533916-0-2)
- Le Signe du Serpent
- La Vallée des Rois
- Le Charognard
