= Moulin de Valmy =

Windmill in Valmy, Marne, France

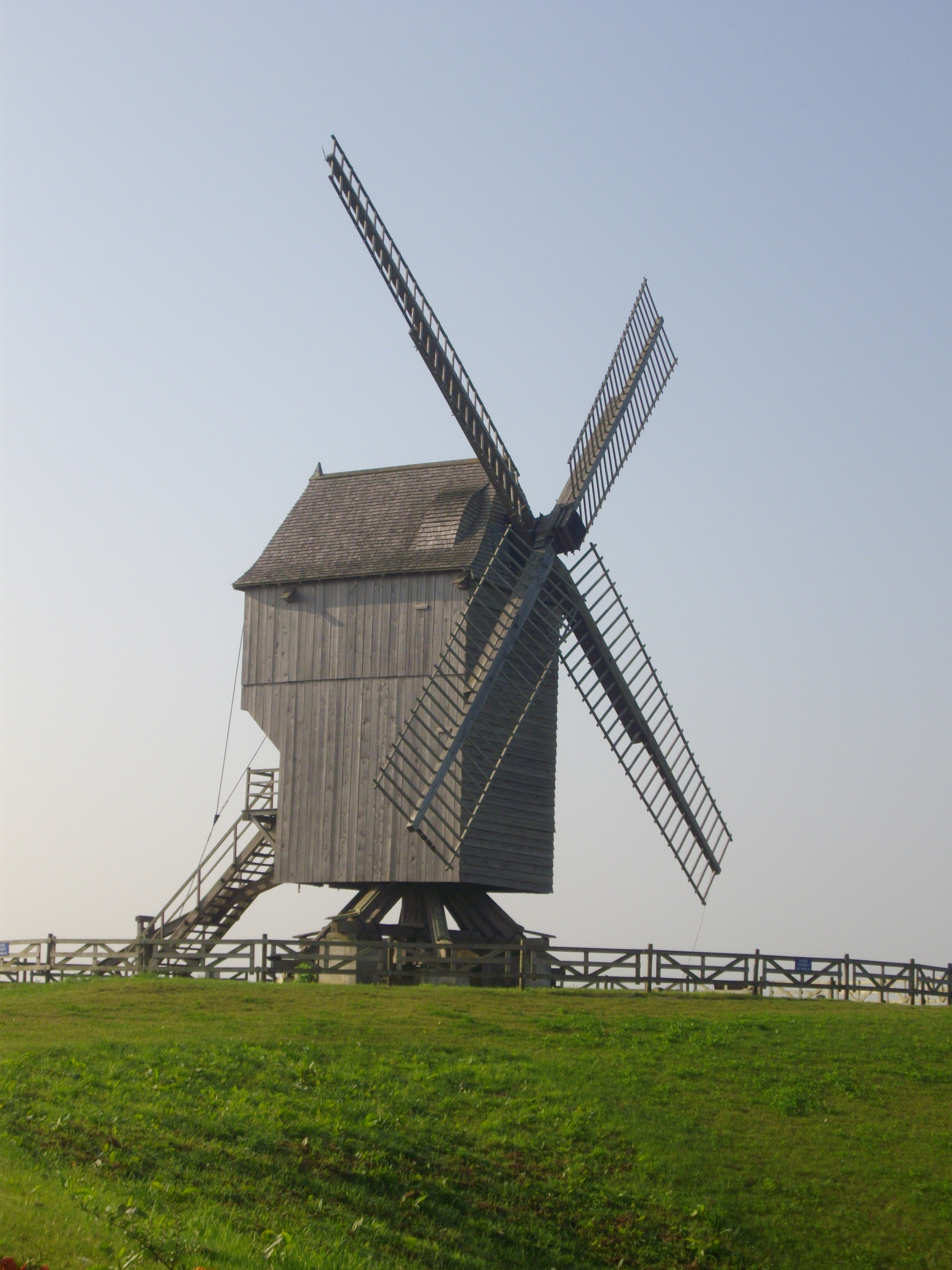
- Moulin de Valmy, September 2018

Origin
- Mill name: Moulin de Valmy
- Mill location: Valmy, Marne, France
- Coordinates: 49°04′47″N 4°46′02″E
- Operator(s): Mairie de Valmy
- Year built: 2005

Information
- Purpose: Corn mill
- Type: Moulin pivot
- No. of sails: Four
- Type of sails: Common sails
- Windshaft: Wood
- Winding: Tailpole
- No. of pairs of millstones: Two

The Moulin de Valmy is a post mill (French: moulin pivot) at Valmy, Marne, France. A windmill that stood on the site in 1634 was burnt during the Battle of Valmy in 1792. Its replacement was demolished in 1831. A mill was moved from Attiches, Nord in 1947. It blew down in 1999, but was rebuilt in 2005.

== History ==
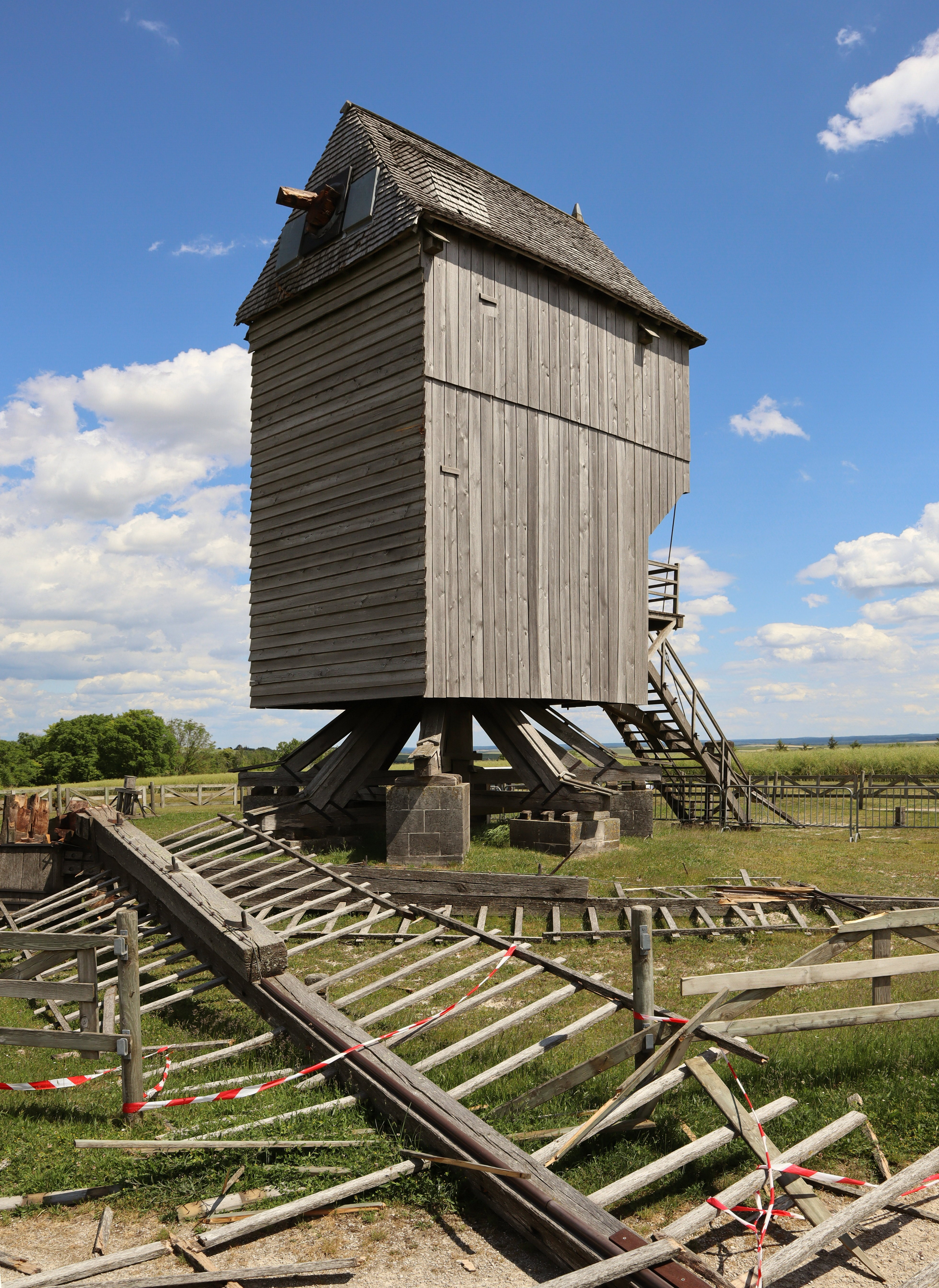
The heavily damaged mill after a storm in May 2022.

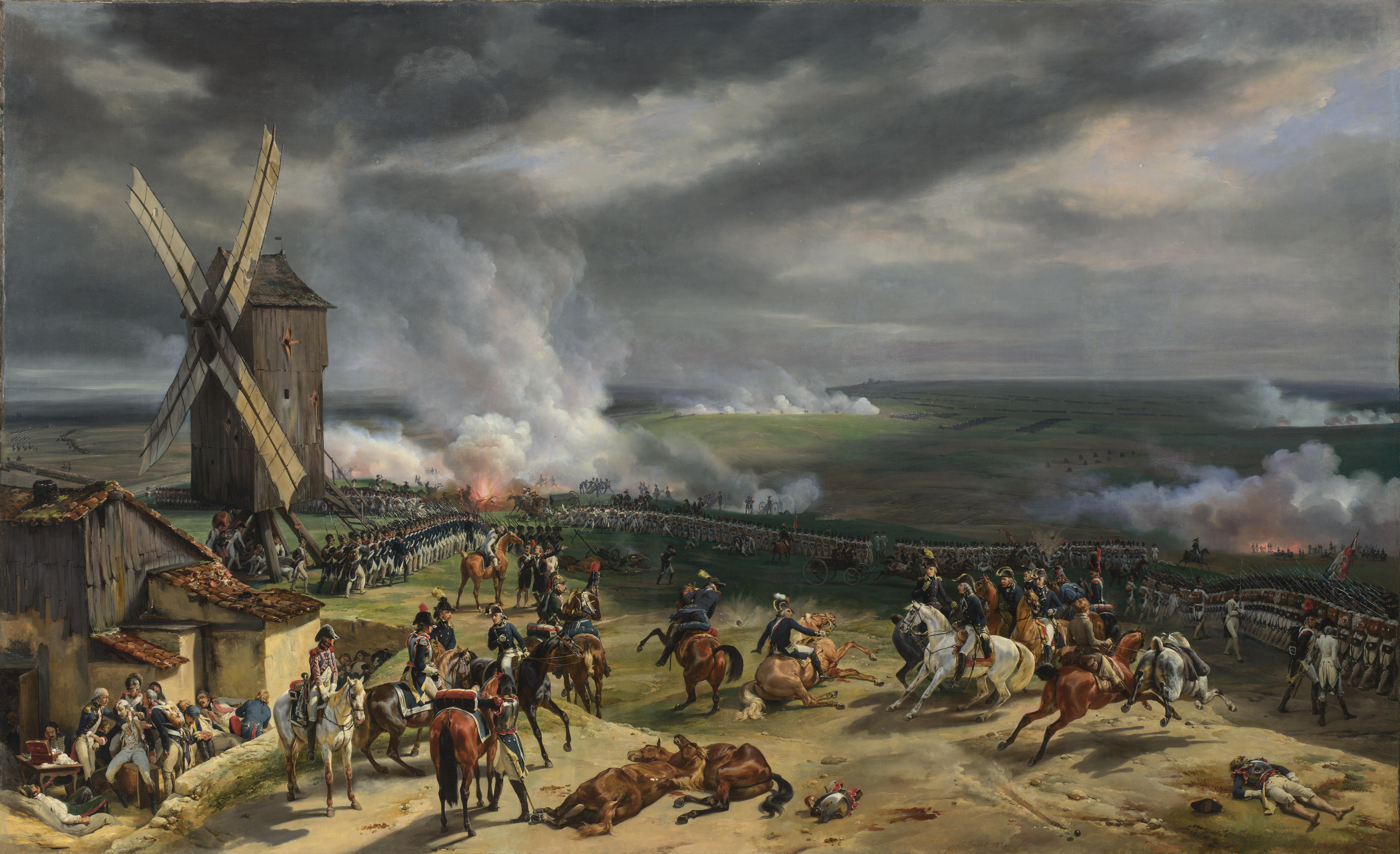
The Battle of Valmy, 1792, painted by Horace Vernet in 1826.

The earliest mention of a windmill at Valmy was in 1634. In 1762, the miller, Jean-Baptiste Portelot was also the mayor of Valmy. He died in 1776 and the mill passed to his son Jean-Antoine Blot, who gave the mill to Portelot's cousin Nicolas Thomas, who was the miller at the time of the Battle of Valmy in 1792. The mill was burnt down on the day of the battle, 20 September 1792, on the orders of Général François Kellermann because it was an aiming point for the Prussian artillery.

After much argument, the mill was rebuilt. Exactly when is not known, but it was standing by 10 Pluviôse VII (29 January 1800) when Thomas sold the mill to Jacques Dannequin. His sons sold the mill to Edmond Nollet-Thièrry c.1823. Due to competition from local watermills, the mill was demolished by the Thièrry family in 1831.

In 1939, it was decided to rebuild the mill, and a public subscription was opened for the purpose. Sufficient money had been collected by the time war broke out in September 1939. A post mill from Attiches, Nord was bought and moved to Valmy. The mill was officially inaugurated in September 1947. On 10 May 1989, the mill was listed as a Monument historique. A restoration of the mill was carried out in 1998 at a cost of 1.2 million franc. On 26 December 1999, the mill was blown down by Cyclone Lothar. It was decided that the mill would be rebuilt. The first stone was laid on 16 September 2004 and the rebuilt mill was inaugurated on 20 September 2005. The restoration cost 380,000 euro.

On 4 May 2022 the mill was heavily damaged when its sails broke off in a storm.

== Description ==
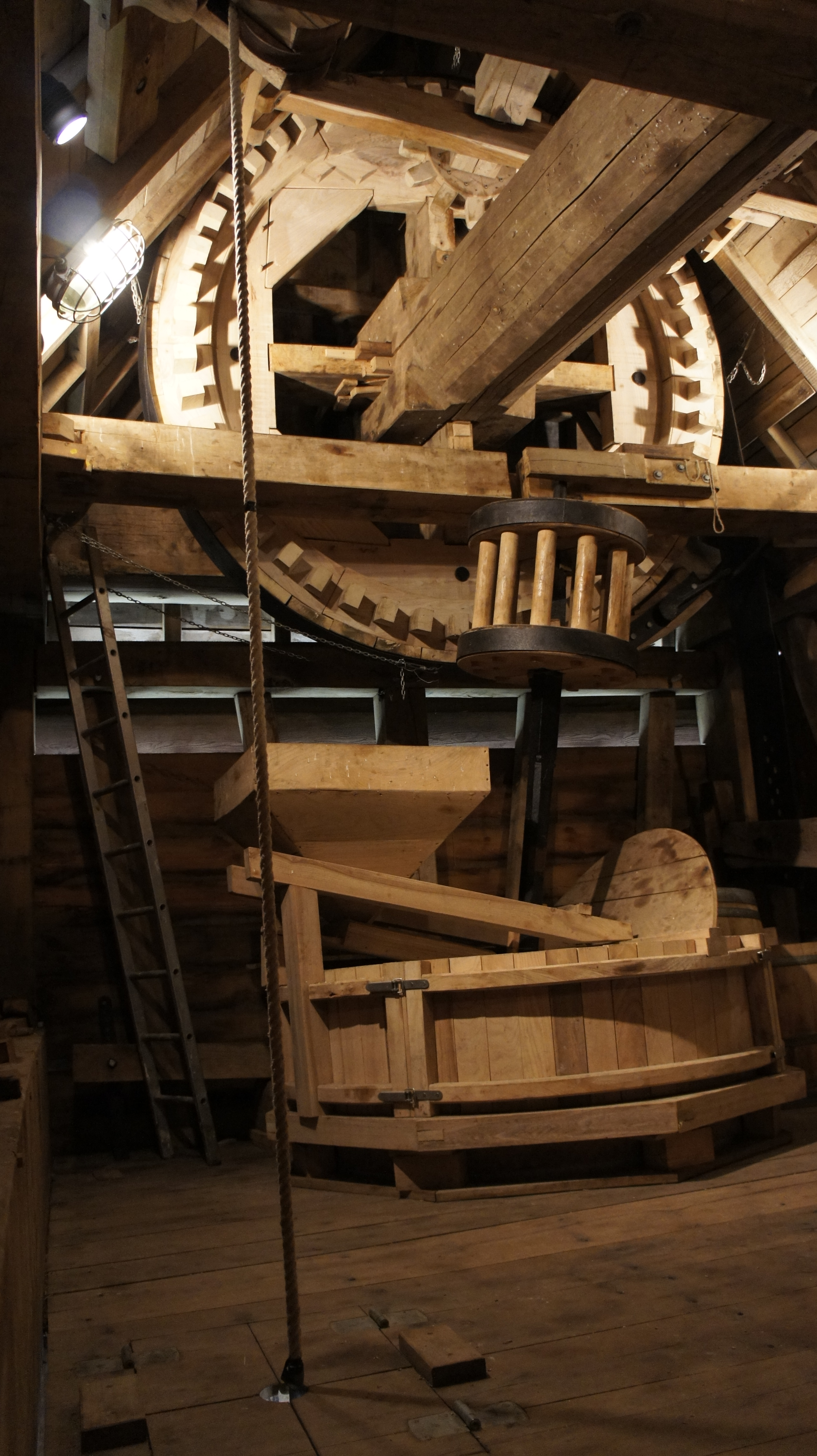
Inside the mills

The Moulin de Valmy is an open trestle post mill. It has four Common sails carried on a wooden windshaft. There are two pairs of millstones, arranged head and tail. The trestle is unusual in having three crosstrees (instead of the usual two) and thus six pairs of doubled quarterbars.
