= Enchères sous Pavillon noir =

Enchères sous Pavillon noir is a 1987 role-playing game adventure published by Jeux Descartes for Maléfices.

== Contents ==
Enchères sous Pavillon noir is an adventure in which the player characters are drawn into Guadeloupe's voodoo world, joining a ceremony while being relentlessly pursued by Mama Tas de Fer through zombies and spells, raising the question of whether she is truly a witch.

== Reviews ==
- Casus Belli #37
- Jeux & Stratégie #45
