= La musique adoucit les meurtres =

La musique adoucit les meurtres is a 1987 role-playing game adventure published by Jeux Descartes for Maléfices.

== Plot summary ==
La musique adoucit les meurtres is an adventure in which the Pythagoras Club encounters Fantômas's sinister "little brother," a protean killer echoing Maldoror's nihilistic credo.

== Reviews ==
- Casus Belli #40
- Jeux & Stratégie #47
