= Les Brasiers ne s'éteignent jamais =

Les Brasiers ne s'éteignent jamais is a 1986 role-playing game adventure published by Jeux Descartes for Maléfices.

== Contents ==
Les Brasiers ne s'éteignent jamais is an adventure in which the town of Loudun is the setting, where the player characters—descendants of those entangled in the infamous 17th-century demonic possession scandal—must confront the lingering shadows of ancestral guilt and occult legacy.

== Reviews ==
- Casus Belli #32
- Jeux & Stratégie #39
