= Le dompteur de Volcans =

Le dompteur de Volcans is a 1986 role-playing game adventure published by Jeux Descartes for Maléfices.

== Contents ==
Le dompteur de Volcans is an adventure in which a Burmese fakir is based on a real historical figure.

== Reviews ==
- Casus Belli #36
- Jeux & Stratégie #43
