= À la lisière de la nuit =

À la lisière de la nuit is a 1986 role-playing game supplement published by Jeux Descartes for Maléfices.

== Contents ==
À la lisière de la nuit is a supplement in which a practical game guide is filled with scenario ideas, an extensive study of magic, sorcery, and spiritism, complete with spells, charms, potions, illustrations, and fantastical tales.

== Reviews ==
- Casus Belli #35
- Jeux & Stratégie #43
