= Padua Circular =

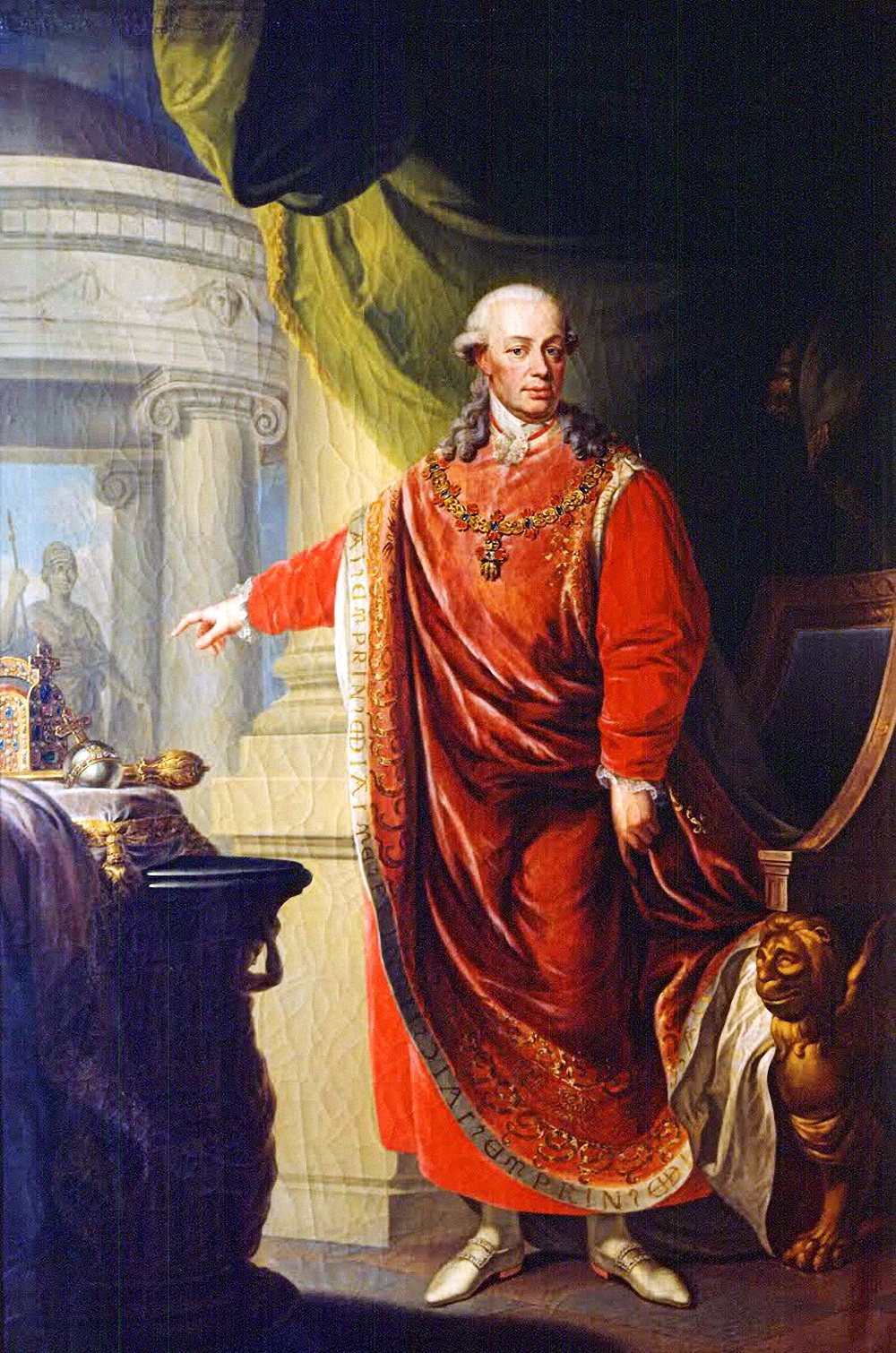
Johann Daniel Donat, Emperor Leopold II in the Regalia of the Golden Fleece (1806)

The Padua Circular was a diplomatic note produced by Holy Roman Emperor Leopold II on 6 July 1791. Prompted by the arrest of Louis XVI and Marie Antoinette after the Flight to Varennes, the Circular called on the sovereigns of Europe to join him in demanding their freedom. It was followed by diplomatic initiatives in which the Habsburg monarchy looked for rapprochement with its traditional enemy, Hohenzollern Prussia.

The Padua Circular met with little enthusiasm by the other powers of Europe so there was no basis for any kind of collective action by the powers on behalf of the French king.

However, it led to a convention between Prussia and Austria on 25 July 1791, which settled all outstanding disputes, pledged co-operation over France and paved the way for the more substantive Declaration of Pillnitz, authored jointly by Austria and Prussia, in August 1791.
