= Ave Tenebrae =

Ave Tenebrae is a 1982 board game published by Dragonlords / Jeux Descartes.

== Gameplay ==
Ave Tenebrae is a game in which a fantasy wargame lets players stage epic magical medieval battles using simple rules, five scenarios, and components including a large hex map, 800 counters, a 16‑page rulebook, and player aids.

== Reviews ==
- Casus Belli #36
- Jeux & Stratégie #18
