= Napoléon à Austerlitz =

Napoleonic board wargame

Napoléon à Austerlitz is a board wargame published by Descartes Editeur in 1977 that simulates the Battle of Austerlitz. It was the first board wargame published in France.

== Background ==
In 1805, an Allied force of Russians and Austrians of the Fourth Coalition was lured into a trap by Napoleon near the town of Austerlitz, resulting in the Battle of Austerlitz, also known as the Battle of the Three Emperors.

== Description ==
Napoléon à Austerlitz is a two-player Napoleonic wargame in which one player controls French forces, while the other player controls Russo-Austrian forces. The rules are not complex — the rulebook is only 14 pages — but the game can introduce players to popular board wargame concepts such as zone of control and demoralization. The counters are double-sided, with each unit's strength and identity hidden until it is engaged in combat in order to induce a fog of war.

There are special rules allowing the French to bombard the Russians crossing a frozen lake, resulting in the ice breaking, sinking the Russian units into the lake.

There is only one scenario provided, and the game takes 12 turns. The first turn replicates heavy fog at dawn on the day of the battle by reducing movement, preventing bombardment and reducing the effect of artillery. As darkness falls in Turn 12, the same effects are used to simulate the dusk. The game can be played in about 2 hours.

== Publication history ==
Napoléon à Austerlitz was designed by the French game designer Jean-Pierre Défieux, who self-published the first two editions of the game through his company Descartes Editeur, later to become Jeux Descartes. It was the first board wargame published in France.

== Reception ==
In Issue 27 of the British wargaming magazine Phoenix, Rob Gibson noted "This is by no means the largest simulation of Austerlitz, but somewhat larger than the average Napoleonic [quadrigame published by SPI]." Gibson liked the double-sided counters, commenting "the Fog of War works quite realistically." Gibson did point out that the map was not entirely accurate with regard to terrain "but the vital front-line terrain is all there: swamps, frozen lakes, pheasanteries, the lot." Gibson concluded, "All in all, a very entertaining game where skill in troop handling counts."

In Issue 6 of the French games magazine Jeux & Stratégie, Michel Brassinne thought this was a perfect game for a beginner, calling it "without doubt, the best initiation into classic wargaming." Brassinne liked the simplicity of the rules, commenting, "You will discover with pleasure how many refinements have been brought together with simplicity to increase the plausibility of the situation. This feels like the battle!"
