= Declaration of Pillnitz =

1791 statement by Prussia and the Holy Roman Empire

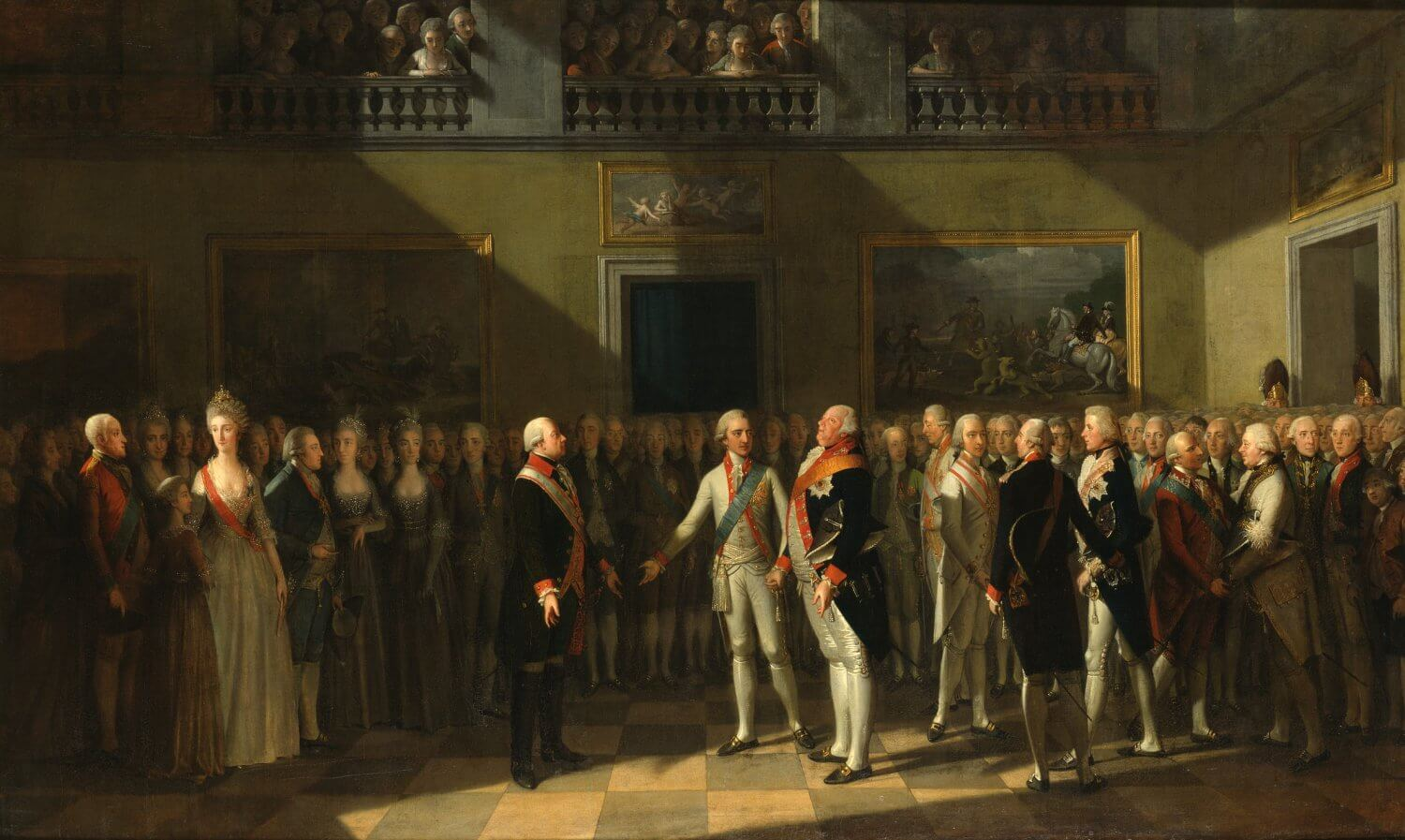
The meeting at Pillnitz Castle in 1791. Oil painting by J. H. Schmidt, 1791.

The Declaration of Pillnitz was a statement of five sentences issued on 27 August 1791 at Pillnitz Castle near Dresden (Saxony) by Frederick William II of Prussia and the Habsburg Leopold II, Holy Roman Emperor who was Marie Antoinette's brother. It declared the joint support of the Holy Roman Empire and of Prussia for King Louis XVI of France against the French Revolution.

== Background ==
Since the French Revolution of 1789, Leopold had become increasingly concerned about the safety of his sister Marie Antoinette and her family, but felt that any intervention in French affairs would only increase their danger. At the same time, many French aristocrats were fleeing France and taking up residence in neighbouring countries, spreading fear of the Revolution and agitating for foreign support to Louis XVI. After Louis and his family had fled Paris in the hopes of inciting a counter-revolution, known as the Flight to Varennes in June 1791, Louis had been apprehended and was returned to Paris and kept under armed guard. On 6 July 1791, Leopold issued the Padua Circular, calling on the sovereigns of Europe to join him in demanding Louis' freedom.

== Purpose ==
Calling on European powers to intervene if Louis was threatened, the declaration was intended to serve as a warning to the French revolutionaries to stop infringing on the king's prerogatives and to permit his resumption of power.

The declaration stated that Austria would go to war if and only if all the other major European powers also went to war with France. Leopold chose this wording so that he would not be forced to go to war. The addition of 'all' also masked how many powers were expected to be involved before Austria got involved. He knew that the British prime minister, William Pitt, did not support war with France. Leopold issued the declaration only to satisfy the French émigrés who had taken refuge in his country and were calling for foreign interference in their homeland.

(The Pillnitz Conference itself dealt mainly with the Polish Question and the war of Austria against the Ottoman Empire.)

== Text of the Declaration ==
His Majesty, the Emperor, and his Majesty, the King of Prussia, having given attention to the wishes and representations of Monsieur (the brother of the King of France), and of M. le Comte d'Artois, jointly declare that they regard the present situation of His Majesty the King of France, as a matter of common interest to all the sovereigns of Europe. They trust that this interest will not fail to be recognized by the powers, whose aid is solicited, and that in consequence they will not refuse to employ, in conjunction with their said majesties, the most efficient means in proportion to their resources to place the King of France in a position to establish, with the most absolute freedom, the foundations of a monarchical form of government, which shall at once be in harmony with the rights of sovereigns and promote the welfare of the French nation. In that case [Alors et dans ce cas] their said majesties the Emperor and the King of Prussia are resolved to act promptly and in common accord with the forces necessary to obtain the desired common end.

In the meantime they will give such orders to their troops as are necessary in order that these may be in a position to be called into active service.

== Consequences ==
The National Assembly of France interpreted the declaration to mean that Austria and Prussia were threatening the revolution, which had the result of radicalising the French revolutionaries and increasing tensions. The National Assembly voted for the French annexation of the Comtat Venaissin including Avignon from the Papal States in September 1791. Austria and Prussia concluded a defensive alliance in February 1792. Radical Frenchmen who called for war, such as Jacques Pierre Brissot, used the Declaration of Pillnitz as a pretext to gain influence and declare war on 20 April 1792, leading to the campaigns of 1792 in the French Revolutionary Wars.
