= Le Charognard =

Le Charognard is a 1988 role-playing game supplement published by Jeux Descartes for Légendes.

== Contents ==
Le Charognard is a supplement in which is featured a historical scenario set in Reims in 1192, extensive play aids including a medieval slang lexicon, and a solo adventure in the Ardennes.

== Reviews ==
- Casus Belli #46
- Jeux & Stratégie #52
