= Bataille de la Marne 1914 =

Bataille de la Marne 1914 is a 1982 board game published by Descartes Editeur.

== Gameplay ==
Bataille de la Marne 1914 is a game in which French, British and German units are involved in the First Battle of the Marne.

== Reviews ==
- Casus Belli #22
- Jeux & Stratégie #20
