= Friedland (game) =

Board game

Friedland is a 1980 board game published by Jeux Descartes.

== Gameplay ==
Friedland is a game in which the June 14, 1807 battle between Napoleon and Benningsen is depicted.

== Reviews ==
- Casus Belli #20
- Jeux & Stratégie #25
