= La Vallée des Rois =

La Vallée des Rois is a 1988 role-playing game supplement published by Jeux Descartes for Légendes.

== Contents ==
La Vallée des Rois is a supplement in which player characters are heroes of ancient Egypt, serving Pharaohs, wielding magic, or shaping history through legendary exploits immortalized by artists.

== Reviews ==
- Casus Belli #43
- Casus Belli #45
- Jeux & Stratégie #50
