= Le Signe du Serpent =

Le Signe du Serpent is a 1985 role-playing game supplement published by Jeux Descartes for Légendes.

== Contents ==
Le Signe du Serpent is a supplement in which a campaign boxed set comes with two books and a screen, where player characters embark on a bard's challenge to defeat a sorcerer in the Hyperboreal Isles and recover the Serpent Sign artifact.

== Reviews ==
- Casus Belli #34
- Jeux & Stratégie #42
