= Les Aigles =

Les Aigles is a board game published by Jeux Descartes.

== Gameplay ==
Les Aigles is a game in which a Napoleonic battalion‑level miniatures game features semi‑simultaneous, order‑driven rules and a bilingual (English/French) rulebook.

== Reviews ==
- Casus Belli #38
- Jeux & Stratégie #45
