= 2ème D.B. 'I' Normandie =

Board game

2ème D.B. 'I' Normandie is a 1983 board game published by Jeux Descartes.

== Gameplay ==
2ème D.B. 'I' Normandie is a game in which tank battles are depicted in Normandy.

== Reviews ==
- Casus Belli #18
- Jeux & Stratégie #24
