= Guet-Apens (game) =

1988 board game

Guet-Apens is a 1988 board game published by Jeux Descartes.

== Gameplay ==
Guet-Apens is a game in which a medieval wargame features detailed simulation rules for various troops and twelve scenarios.

== Reviews ==
- Casus Belli #45
- Jeux & Stratégie #52
