= Jean-Sébastien Rouillard =

French painter (1789–1852)

Jean-Sébastien Rouillard (1789 in Paris – 1852) was a French portrait painter. A student of Jacques-Louis David, he exhibited at the Salon from 1817 onwards and gained many official commissions, notably for the musée de l'Histoire de France at the château de Versailles. He was awarded the Légion d'honneur. He married the miniature painter Françoise-Julie-Aldrovandine Lenoir, who died in the 1832 Paris cholera epidemic. They had two children, including the talented amateur painter Stéphanie (1822-1908), who in 1842 married the agronomist Victor Rendu. The Rouillard family tomb is in the first section of the first division of the cimetière du Montparnasse.
