= The Battle of Valmy =

Painting by Horace Vernet

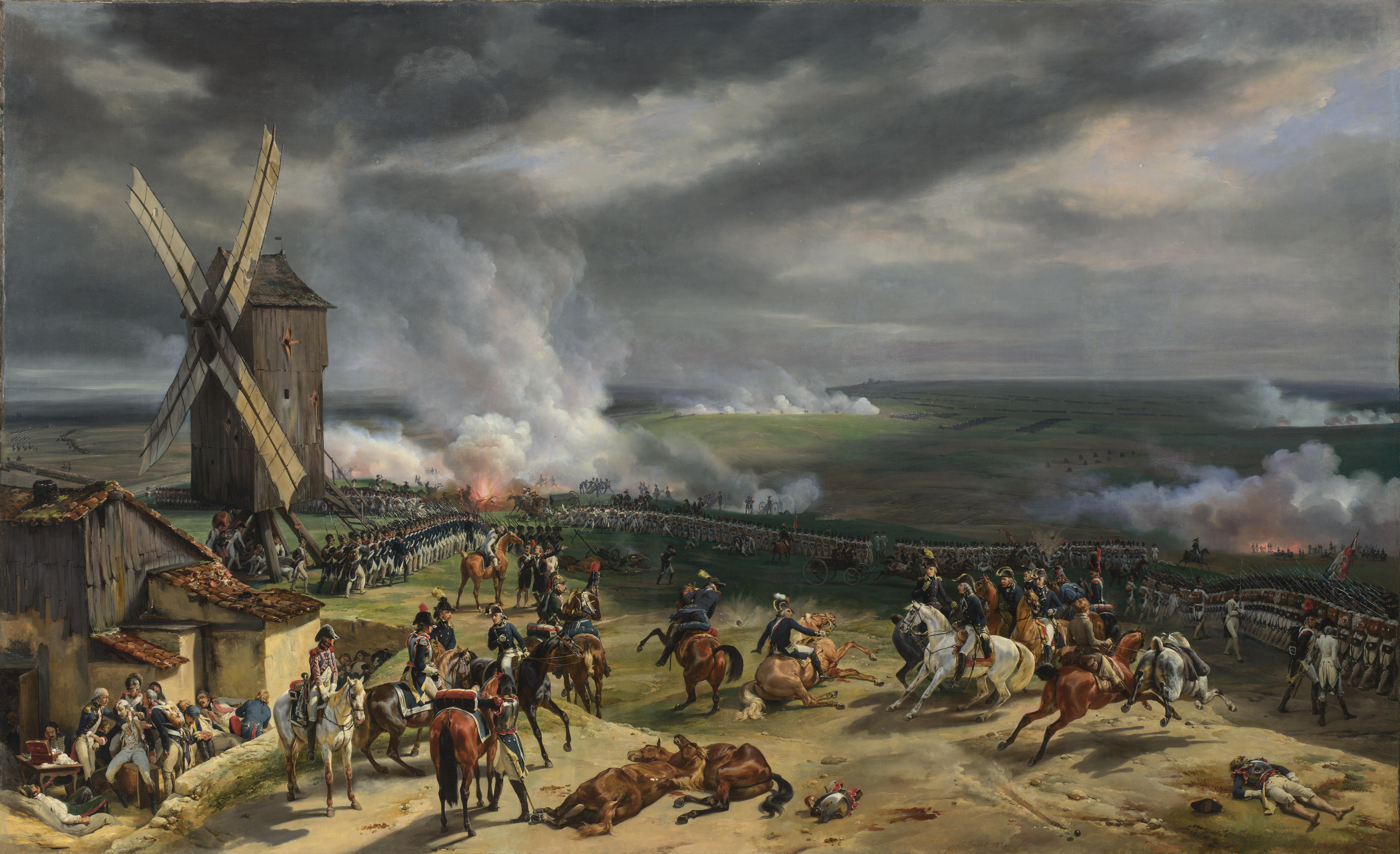
- Artist: Horace Vernet
- Year: 1826
- Medium: Oil on canvas
- Dimensions: 174.6 cm × 287 cm (68.7 in × 113 in)
- Location: National Gallery, London

The Battle of Valmy is an 1826 history painting by the French artist Horace Vernet. It depicts the Battle of Valmy, one of the earliest battles of the French Revolutionary Wars fought on 20 September 1792. The revolutionary French troops defeated an advance by a coalition of foreign forces under the command of the Duke of Brunswick.

It was the last of four large battle paintings commissioned from Vernet by the Duke of Orleans, a future monarch of France, each commemorating notable French victories from the Revolutionary and Napoleonic eras. When the Duke came to the throne following the July Revolution he hung the battle paintings in his residence at the Palais-Royal in Paris. All four of the series of paintings are now in the collection of the National Gallery in London, having passed through the ownership of the art collector Lord Hertford following the death of Orleans in exile.

== Bibliography ==
- Gray, Colin. Strategy for Chaos: Revolutions in Military Affairs and the Evidence of History. Routledge, 2004.
- Harkett, Daniel & Hornstein, Katie (ed.) Horace Vernet and the Thresholds of Nineteenth-Century Visual Culture. Dartmouth College Press, 2017.
- Hornstein, Katie. Picturing War in France, 1792–1856. Yale University Press, 2018.
- Paret, Peter. Imagined Battles: Reflections of War in European Art. UNC Press Books, 1997.
- Wilson, Michael. French Paintings After 1800. National Gallery, 1983.
