= François Christophe de Kellermann =

French Army officer

Marshal of the Empire François Christophe de Kellermann Duke of Valmy
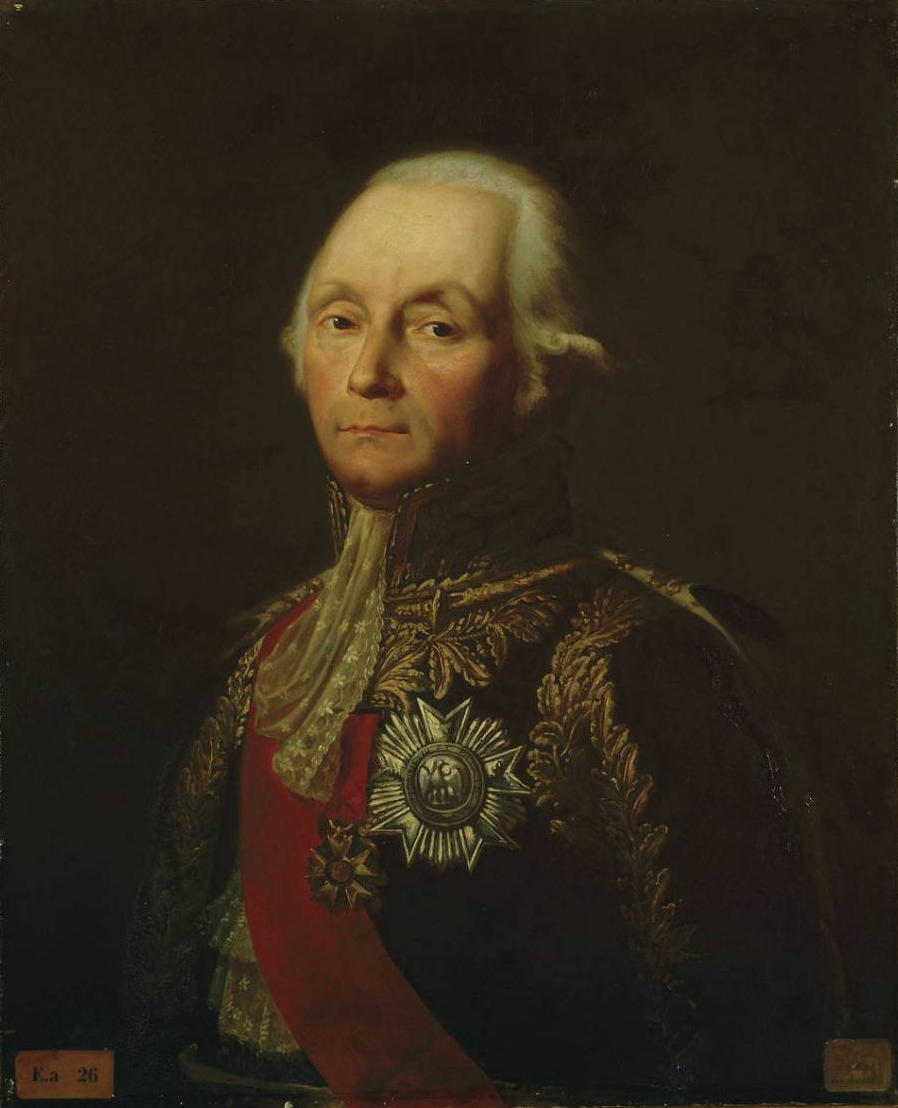
- Portrait by Jeanne Zoé Goyet, 1834
- Born: 28 May 1735; Strasbourg, France
- Died: 13 September 1820 (aged 85); Paris, France
- Military career
- Allegiance: Kingdom of France; French First Republic; First French Empire
- Branch: French Royal Army; French Revolutionary Army; French Imperial Army
- Service years: 1750–1820
- Rank: Army general
- Awards: Grand Cross of the Legion of Honour; Order of the Red Eagle; Grand Cross of the Order of the Württemberg Crown; Grand Dignitary of the House Order of Fidelity; Grand Cross of the Order of Saint Louis

Army-General François-Étienne-Christophe Kellermann or de Kellermann, 1st Duke of Valmy (English: /ˈkɛlərmɑːn/ KEL-ər-mahn, French: [fʁɑ̃swa kʁistɔf də kɛlɛʁman]; 28 May 1735 – 23 September 1820) was a French Army officer and politician who served in the French Revolutionary and Napoleonic Wars. One of the original eighteen Marshals of the Empire created by Napoleon, he was best known for leading the French army to victory at the Battle of Valmy.

Born into a Saxon noble family in Alsace, Kellermann joined the French Royal Army in 1750 and served with distinction in the Seven Years' War. He reached the rank of maréchal de camp in 1785 and was the highest ranked of Napoleon's marshals under the ancien régime. A freemason, Kellermann enthusiastically embraced the Revolution. He was made a lieutenant general in 1789 and achieved a major victory over the Prussian Army at Valmy. Kellerman further distinguished himself as head of the Army of the Alps, but was later imprisoned on suspicion of disloyalty during the Reign of Terror. He was acquitted and reinstated following the fall of Maximilien Robespierre.

After Napoleon came to power, the senior Kellerman was gradually supplanted by younger generals. Although no longer in active duty, he remained an able military administrator and was one of Napoleon's most valuable assistants. He was successively made a senator, Marshal of the Empire and duke. Following the restoration of Louis XVIII, Kellerman retained his titles and was made a peer. He died in 1820. Kellermann is one of the names inscribed on the Arc de Triomphe, on Column 3.

== Early life ==
François Christophe de Kellermann (German: Franz Stephan Christoph Edler von Kellermann) came from a Saxon family, which was long settled in Strasbourg and ennobled. He was the only son of a family living in the French province of Alsace. His father was François de Kellermann (German: Johann Christoph Edler von Kellermann) and his mother, Baroness Marie Magdalene von Dyhrn.

== Military career prior to the Revolution ==
The fifteen-year-old François Kellermann entered the French Army as a cadet volunteer with a hussar regiment: the Régiment de Loweridath. He was commissioned as an ensign in the Royal-Bavière infantry regiment and promoted to captain in 1758 in the course of the Seven Years' War. On one occasion he distinguished himself by capturing 300 prisoners while leading a small cavalry detachment. In 1771, Kellermann saw active service in Poland, becoming a chevalier of the Order of Saint-Louis. A further promotion to capitaine-commandant followed in 1776 before he became major in the Hussars of Conflans (Hussards de Conflans) three years later. Kellermann became brigade general in 1784, and in the following year marechal-de-camp. While a number of Napoleon's marshals served in the Royal army prior to the Revolution, Kellermann was the only one to have reached such senior rank under the former regime.

== Revolutionary career ==
In 1789 Kellermann enthusiastically embraced the cause of the French Revolution, and in 1791 became army general in Alsace. In April 1792 he was made a lieutenant-general, and in August of the same year there came to him the opportunity of his lifetime. He rose to the occasion, and his victory over the Prussians at the Battle of Valmy, in Goethe's words, "opened a new era in the history of the world". Napoleon later commented that: "I think I'm the boldest general that ever lived, but I daren't take post on that ridge with windmill at Valmy (where Kellermann took position) in 1793".

Transferred to the army on the Moselle, Kellermann was accused by General Adam Custine of neglecting to support his operations on the Rhine; but he was acquitted at the bar of the National Convention in Paris, and placed at the head of the army of the Alps and of Italy, in which position he showed himself a careful commander and excellent administrator.

Shortly afterwards he received instructions to reduce Lyon, then in revolt against the convention, but shortly after the surrender he was imprisoned in Paris for thirteen months, during The Terror. After the fall of Robespierre, he was acquitted and reinstated in his command, and did good service in maintaining the south-eastern border against the Austrians until his army was merged into that of General Napoleon Bonaparte in Italy.

== Imperial career ==
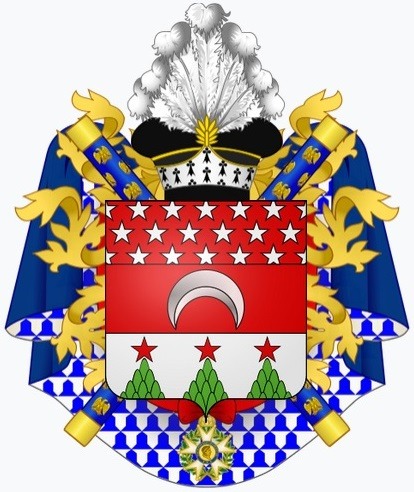
Heraldic achievement of Kellermann as Duke of Valmy

Kellermann was then sixty-two years of age, still physically equal to his work, but the young generals who had come to the front in the previous two years represented the new spirit and the new art of war, and Kellermann's active career came to an end. But the hero of Valmy was never forgotten. When Napoleon came to power Kellermann was named successively senator (1800), president of the Senate (1801), honorary Marshal of France (19 May 1804), and title of Duke of Valmy (1808).

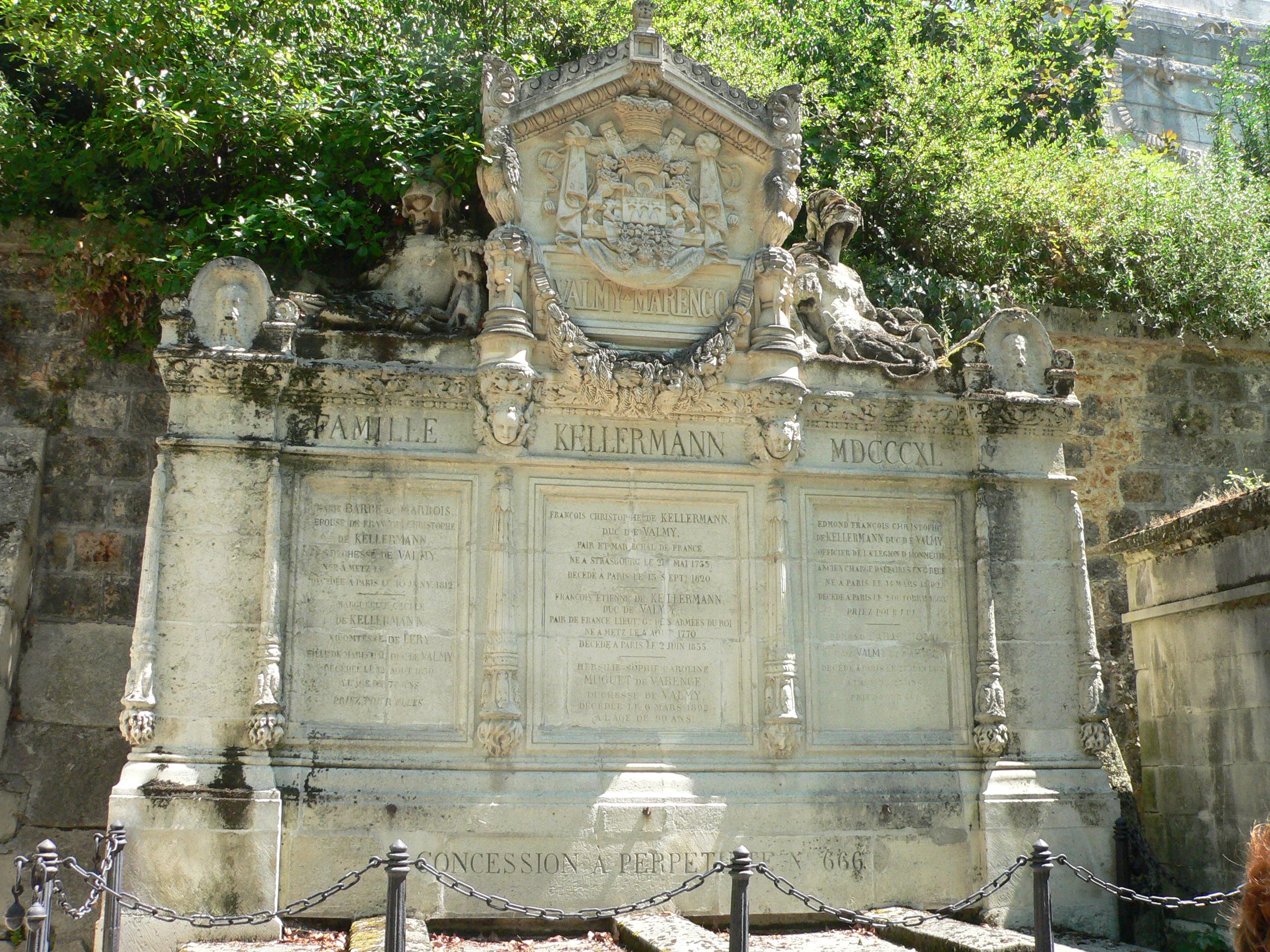
Kellermann's tomb in Père Lachaise Cemetery

In his service to the First French Empire, Kellermann was frequently employed in the administration and training of the army. He also took control of the line of communications and the command of reserve troops, and his long and wide experience made him one of Napoleon's most valuable assistants.

In 1814 he voted for the deposition of the emperor and became a peer under the royal government of Louis XVIII. After the "Hundred Days" he sat in the Chamber of Peers and voted with the Liberals.

Marshal Kellermann died in Paris on 23 September 1820, and is buried in Père Lachaise Cemetery.

His son François Étienne de Kellermann, 2nd Duke of Valmy, also fought for Napoleon and was promoted to cavalry general after the Battle of Marengo. Kellermann's grandson was the politician François Christophe Edmond de Kellermann and his sister Magdalena married the Black Viennese courtier Angelo Soliman.

== Sources ==
- Brown, Frederick (1973). Père Lachaise: elysium as real estate. New York: Viking Press. p. 61. ISBN 0-670-54804-9. OCLC 698450.
- Kielland, Alexander Lange (1908). Napoleon's men and methods. New York: Brentano's. p. 45. OCLC 3636503. "Battle of Valmy Napoleon -wikipedia."
