= Valmy =

- Commune
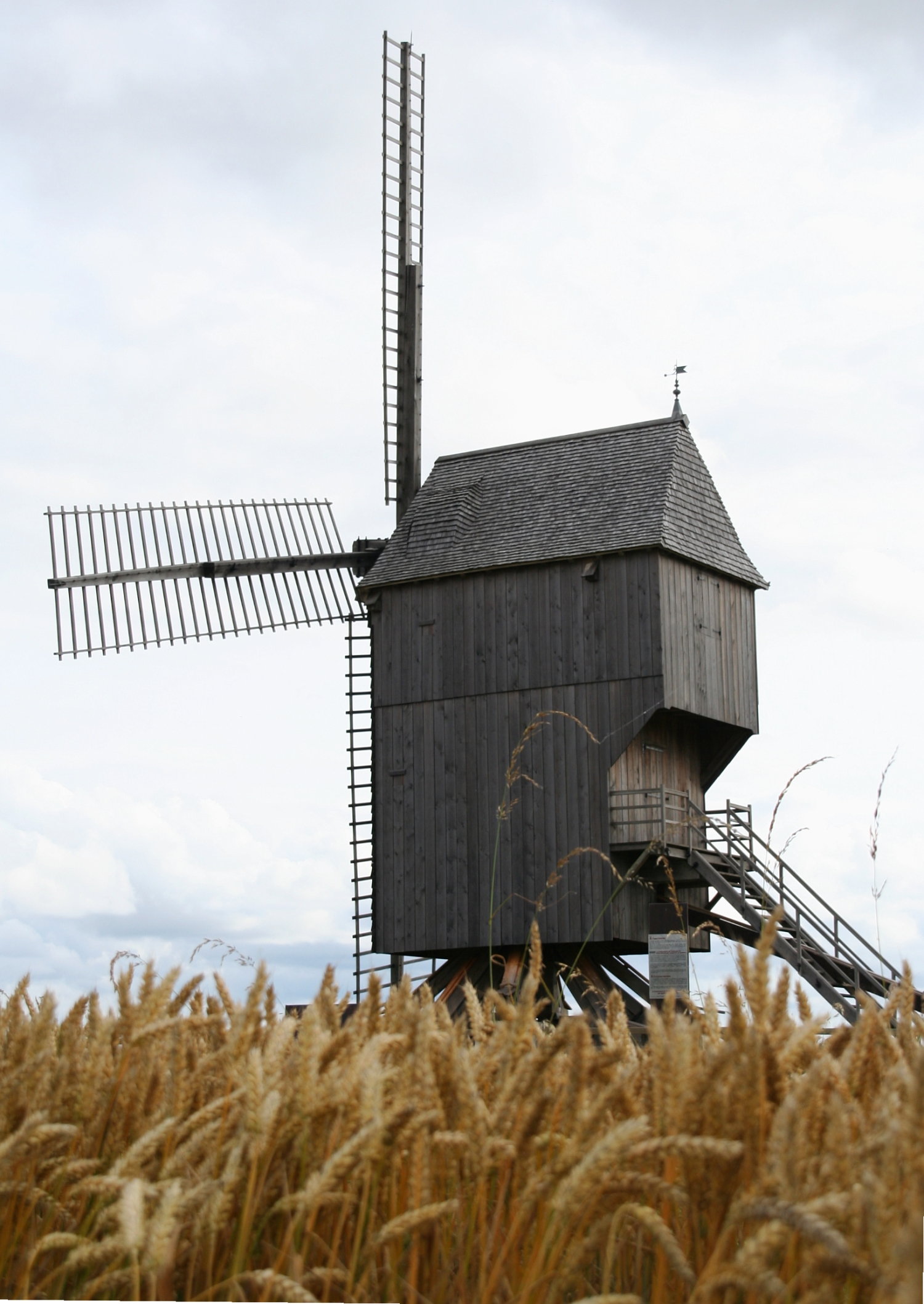
- The Moulin de Valmy stands today where the Battle of Valmy took place

- Coat of arms
- Location of Valmy
- Location within France Location within Grand Est
- Coordinates: 49°05′07″N 4°46′28″E
- Country: France
- Region: Grand Est
- Department: Marne
- Arrondissement: Châlons-en-Champagne
- Canton: Argonne Suippe et Vesle

Government
  - Mayor (2020–2026): Cédric François
- Area^{1}: 24.28 km^{2} (9.37 sq mi)
- Elevation: 164 m (538 ft)
- Population (2023): 234
  - Density: 9.64/km^{2} (25.0/sq mi)
- Time zone: UTC+01:00 (CET)
  - Summer (DST): UTC+02:00 (CEST)
- INSEE/Postal code: 51588 /51800
- ^{1} French Land Register data, which excludes lakes, ponds, glaciers > 1 km^{2} (0.386 sq mi or 247 acres) and river estuaries.

Valmy (French pronunciation: [valmi]) is a rural commune in the Marne department in the Grand Est region in Northeastern France. As of 2023, the population of the commune was 234.

== Geography ==
The town stands on the west flank of the Argonne massif, midway between Verdun and Paris, near Vouziers.

== History ==
Valmy provided the setting for the Battle of Valmy on 20 September 1792. The largest ship-of-the-line ever constructed, the Valmy, was named after this battle.

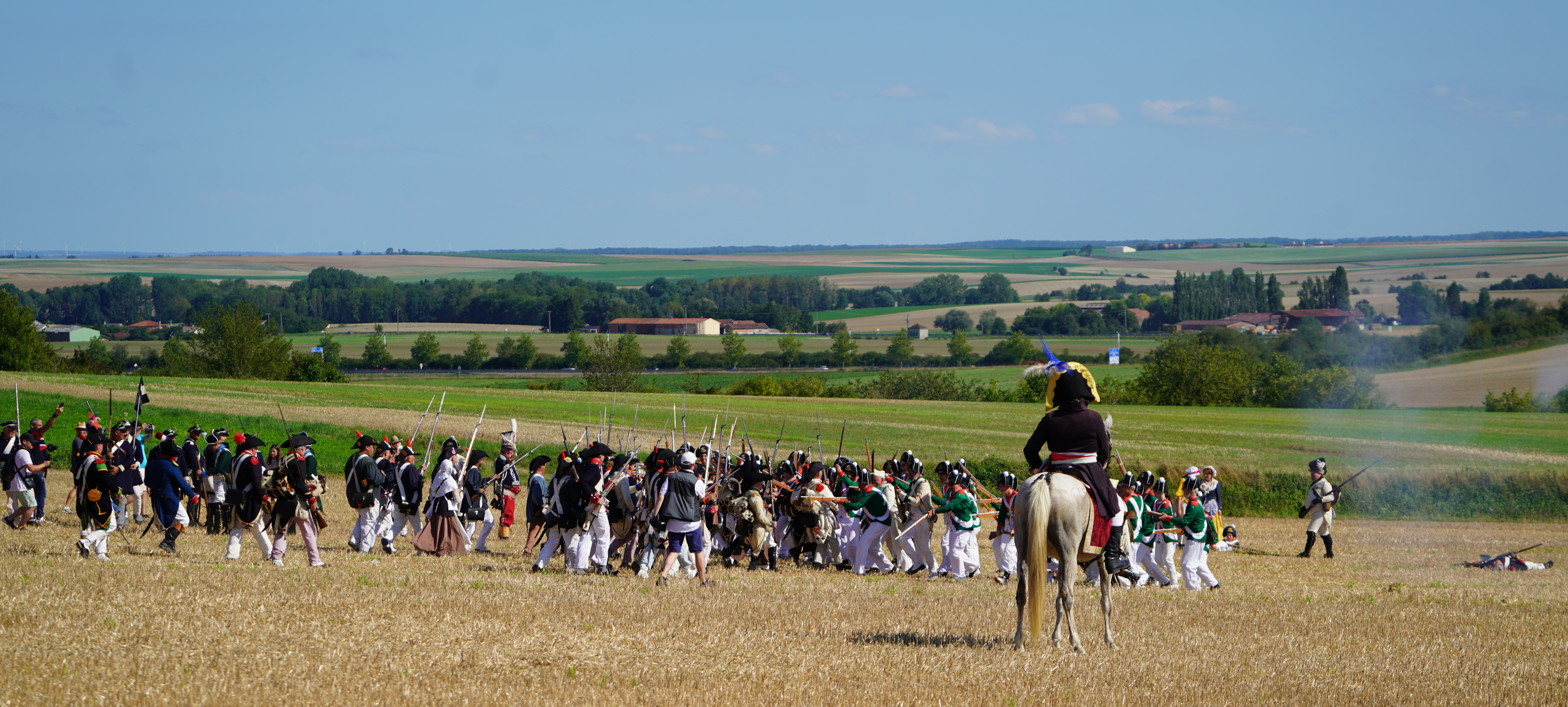
Reenactment of the battle in 2023.

== See also ==
- Communes of the Marne department
