= Battle of Valmy =

1792 battle during the War of the First Coalition

- Part of the War of the First Coalition
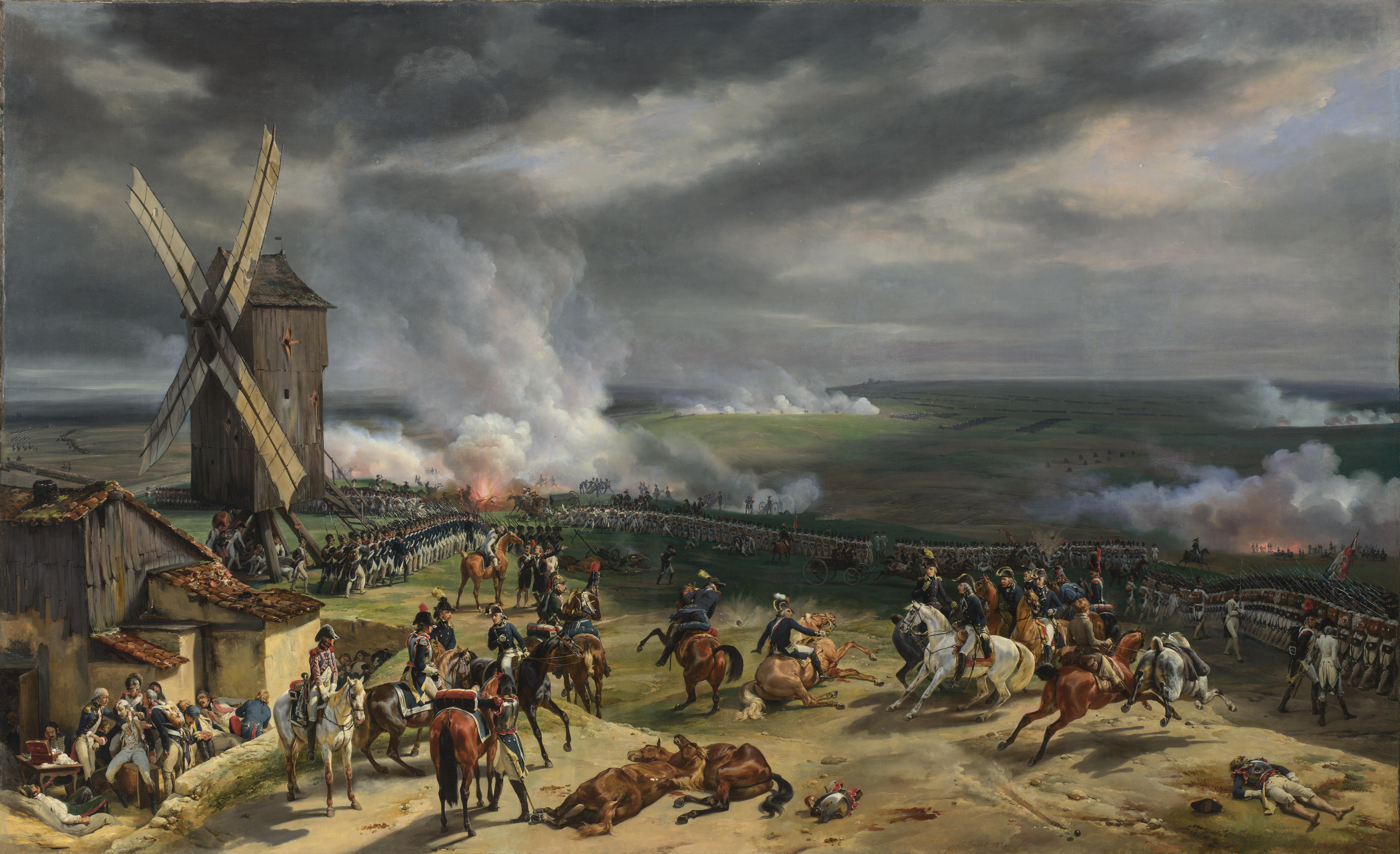
- The Battle of Valmy; Horace Vernet, 1826
Date	20 September 1792
Location	Between Sainte-Menehould and Valmy 49°04′49″N 04°46′02″E
Result	French victory: Republic proclaimed one day later

Belligerents
(Constitutional Cabinet of Louis XVI) Kingdom of France	Kingdom of Prussia; Holy Roman Empire (Kingdom of France) Army of Condé

Commanders and leaders
(Constitutional Cabinet of Louis XVI) Charles François Dumouriez (Constitutional Cabinet of Louis XVI) François Christophe de Kellermann	(Kingdom of Prussia) Duke of Brunswick (Habsburg monarchy) Prince of Hohenlohe (Habsburg monarchy) Count of Clerfayt

Strength
36,000	34,000

Casualties and losses
~300	~200
- Location within Europe

The Battle of Valmy, also known as the Cannonade of Valmy, was the first major victory by the army of France during the Revolutionary Wars that followed the French Revolution. The battle took place on 20 September 1792 as Prussian troops commanded by the Duke of Brunswick attempted to march on Paris. Generals François Kellermann and Charles Dumouriez stopped the advance near the northern village of Valmy in Champagne-Ardenne.

In this early part of the Revolutionary Wars—known as the War of the First Coalition—the new French government was in almost every way unproven, and thus the small, localized victory at Valmy became a huge psychological victory for the Revolution at large. The outcome was thoroughly unexpected by contemporary observers—a vindication for the French revolutionaries and a stunning defeat for the vaunted Prussian army. The victory emboldened the newly assembled National Convention to formally declare the end of monarchy in France and to establish the French Republic. Valmy permitted the development of the Revolution and all its resultant ripple effects, and for that it is regarded by historians as one of the most significant battles in history.

== Background ==
As the French Revolution continued, the monarchies of Europe became concerned that revolutionary fervor would spread to their countries. The War of the First Coalition was an effort to stop the revolution, or at least contain it to France. King Frederick William II of Prussia had the support of Great Britain and the Austrian Empire to send the Duke of Brunswick towards Paris with a large army. In the war's early encounters of mid-1792, French troops did not distinguish themselves, and enemy forces advanced dangerously deep into France intending to pacify the country, restore the traditional monarchy, and end the Revolution. The French commander Charles Dumouriez, meanwhile, had been marching his army northeast to attack the Austrian Netherlands, but this plan was abandoned because of the more immediate threat to Paris. A second army under General François Kellermann was ordered to link up with him in a mutual defense.

Just over half of the French infantry were regulars of the old Royal Army, as were nearly all of the cavalry and, most importantly, the artillery, which were widely regarded as the best in Europe at the time. These veterans provided a professional core to steady the enthusiastic volunteer battalions. Combined, Dumouriez' Army of the North and Kellermann's Army of the Centre totalled approximately 54,000 troops. Heading towards them was Brunswick's coalition army of about 84,000, drilled Prussian and Austrian troops augmented by large complements of Hessians and emigres of the French royalist Army of Condé.

== Battle ==
The invading army handily captured Longwy on 23 August and Verdun on 2 September, then moved on toward Paris through the defiles of the Forest of Argonne. In response, Dumouriez halted his advance to the Netherlands and reversed course, approaching the enemy army from its rear. From Metz, Kellermann moved to his assistance, joining him at the village of Sainte-Menehould on 19 September. The French forces were now east of the Prussians, behind their lines. Theoretically the Prussians could have marched straight towards Paris unopposed, but this course was never seriously considered: the threat to their lines of supply and communication was too great to be ignored. The unfavorable situation was compounded by bad weather and an alarming increase in sickness among the troops. With few other options available, Brunswick turned back and prepared to do battle.

The troops trudged laboriously through a heavy downpour—"rain as of the days of Noah", in the words of Thomas Carlyle. Brunswick headed through the northern woods believing he could cut off Dumouriez. At the moment when the Prussian manœuvre was nearly completed, Kellermann advanced his left wing and took up a position on the slopes between Sainte-Menehould and Valmy. He centered his command around an old windmill, which he quickly razed to prevent enemy artillery spotters from using it as a sighting location. His veteran artillerists were well-placed upon its accommodating ridge to begin the so-called "Cannonade of Valmy". Brunswick moved toward them with about 34,000 of his troops. As they emerged from the woods, a long-range gunnery duel ensued and the French batteries proved superior. It was very unusual when the armies faced one another. The Prussians had their backs towards Paris, while the French faced toward Germany rather than barring the road to Châlons. This configuration contributed to a strange beginning to an already unconventional battle. A change in Brunswick's line of march brought the Prussian main force into direct contact with Kellermann rather than Dumouriez's volunteers. Kellermann deployed his army in a broad arc, with his left along Châlons road, his center on a hill west of Valmy, and his right anchored on Mount Yron. The Prussian infantry made a cautious, and fruitless, effort to advance under fire across the open ground.

Early French artillery fire was affected by fog and rain, but a battery positioned near the inn of La Lune successfully stopped the Prussian cavalry from advancing. Other French artillery units joined Kellermann on the heights. The French infantry advanced only a few hundred feet, while the Prussian infantry advanced roughly 200 yards, repeatedly halted by heavy artillery fire. During the prolonged cannonade, Prussian fire detonated three French ammunition wagons. Despite this setback, Kellermann steadied his infantry by bringing up artillery.

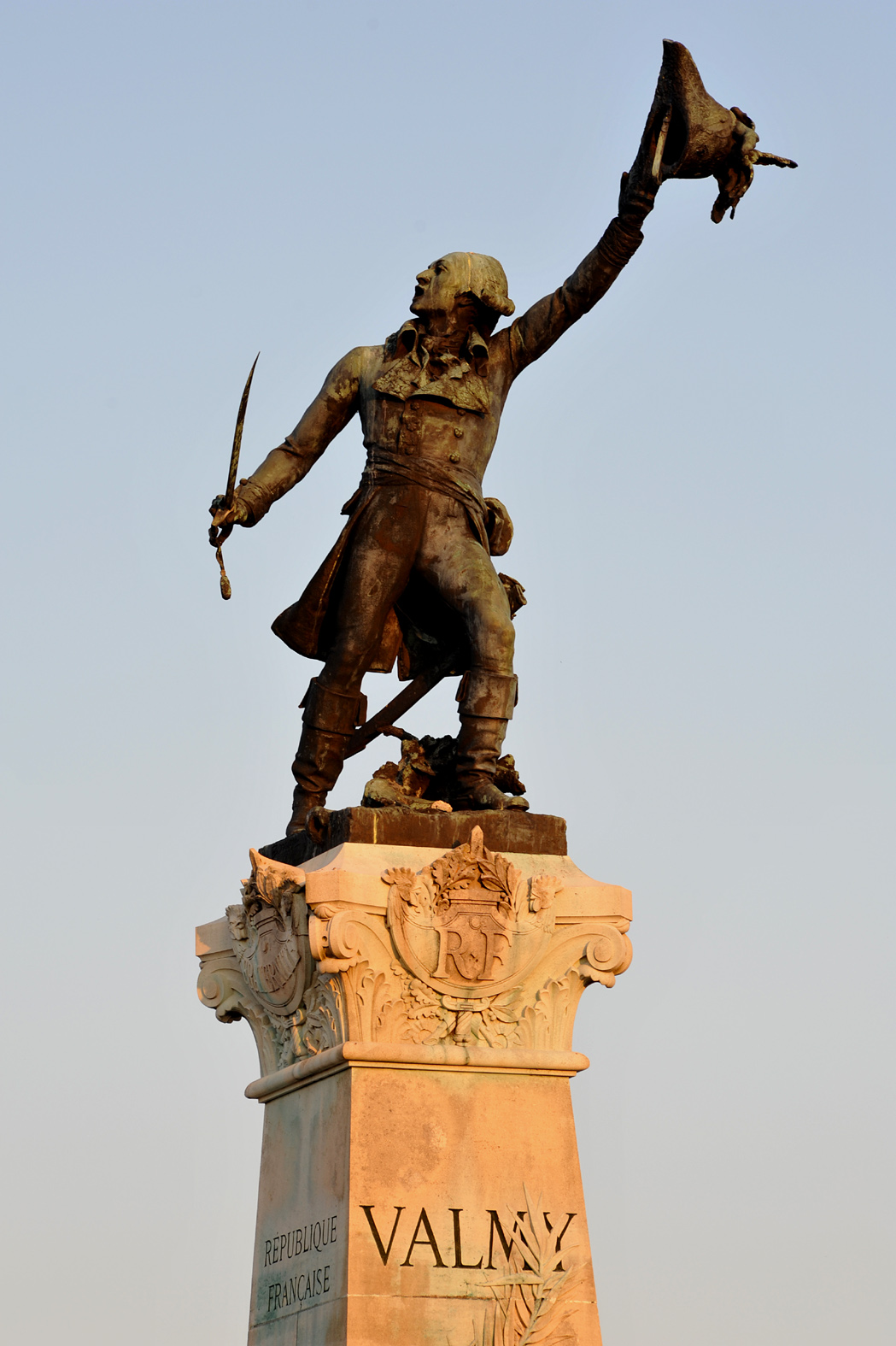
Valmy obelisk with statue of Kellermann

As the Prussians wavered, a pivotal moment was reached when Kellermann raised his hat and made his famous cry of "Vive la Nation". The cry was repeated again and again by all the French army, and had a crushing effect upon Prussian morale. The French troops sang "La Marseillaise" and "Ça Ira", and a cheer went up from the French line. Although several French armies were nearby, Kellermann carried out most of the fighting himself. Dumouriez's army stayed southeast of Sainte-Menehould, Beurononville's troops remained behind Kellermann, and Dillon's forces at Les Islettes stopped Hohenlohe's troops from reinforcing the Prussians. Because of this, Kellermann fought the Battle of Valmy largely on his own. To the surprise of nearly everyone, Brunswick broke off the action and retired from the field. As the night approached, Brunswick, King Frederick William II, and the Prussian officers met near the inn of La Lune. During this meeting, Brunswick reportedly said, "Hier schlagen wir nicht" ("Here we will not strike"), showing that the Prussian leadership believed the battle couldn't be continued. The Prussians rounded the French positions at a great distance and commenced a rapid retreat eastward. The two engaged forces had been essentially equal in size, Kellermann with approximately 36,000 troops and 40 cannon, and Brunswick with 34,000 and 54 cannon. Yet by the time Brunswick retreated, casualties had risen no higher than three hundred French and two hundred Prussians. After the battle, Kellermann moved his troops south of the Châlons road, leaving the Prussians a clear path to retreat. Dumouriez, who took command of both French armies after Valmy, negotiated with the Prussians while strengthening his forces. On September 30, Brunswick withdrew toward Germany without being attacked, as French commanders were ordered not to engage.

=== Prussian retreat ===
The precipitous end to the action provoked elation among the French. The question of exactly why the Prussians withdrew has never been definitively answered. Most historians ascribe the retreat to some combination of the following factors: the highly defensible French position together with the rapidly growing numbers of reinforcements and citizen volunteers with their discouraging and thoroughly unexpected élan which persuaded the cautious Brunswick to spare himself a dangerous loss of manpower, particularly when the Russian invasion of Poland had already raised concerns for Prussia's defensibility in the east. Others have put forward more shadowy motives for the decision, including a secret plea by Louis XVI to avoid an action which might cost him his life, and even bribery of the Prussians, allegedly paid for with the Bourbon crown jewels.

An analysis by Munro Price, reader in history at the University of Bradford and a modern specialist in this period, concludes that there is no convincing proof of bribery turning back the Prussians. The more likely explanation remains that, having initially adopted an aggressive strategy, Brunswick lacked the will to carry it through when confronted by an unexpectedly determined and disciplined opposition. Brunswick had actually been offered command of the French armies prior to the outbreak of war and émigré factions subsequently used this as a basis to allege treachery on his part. In any case, the battle ended decisively, the French pursuit was not seriously pressed, and Brunswick's troops managed a safe if inglorious eastward retreat.

== Aftermath ==
This engagement was the turning point of the Prussians' campaign. Beset with food shortages and dysentery, their retreat continued well past the Rhine River. French troops soon struck forward into Germany, taking Mainz in October. Dumouriez once again moved against the Austrian Netherlands and Kellermann ably secured the front at Metz.

Dumouriez would bear a harsh change of fortune: after one more influential success in November 1792 at Jemappes, he was by the following year a broken man. His army had suffered such catastrophic losses that he defected to the royalist side for the rest of his life. Kellermann, however, continued in a long and distinguished military career. In 1808 he was ennobled by Napoleon and became Duke of Valmy.

== Legacy ==
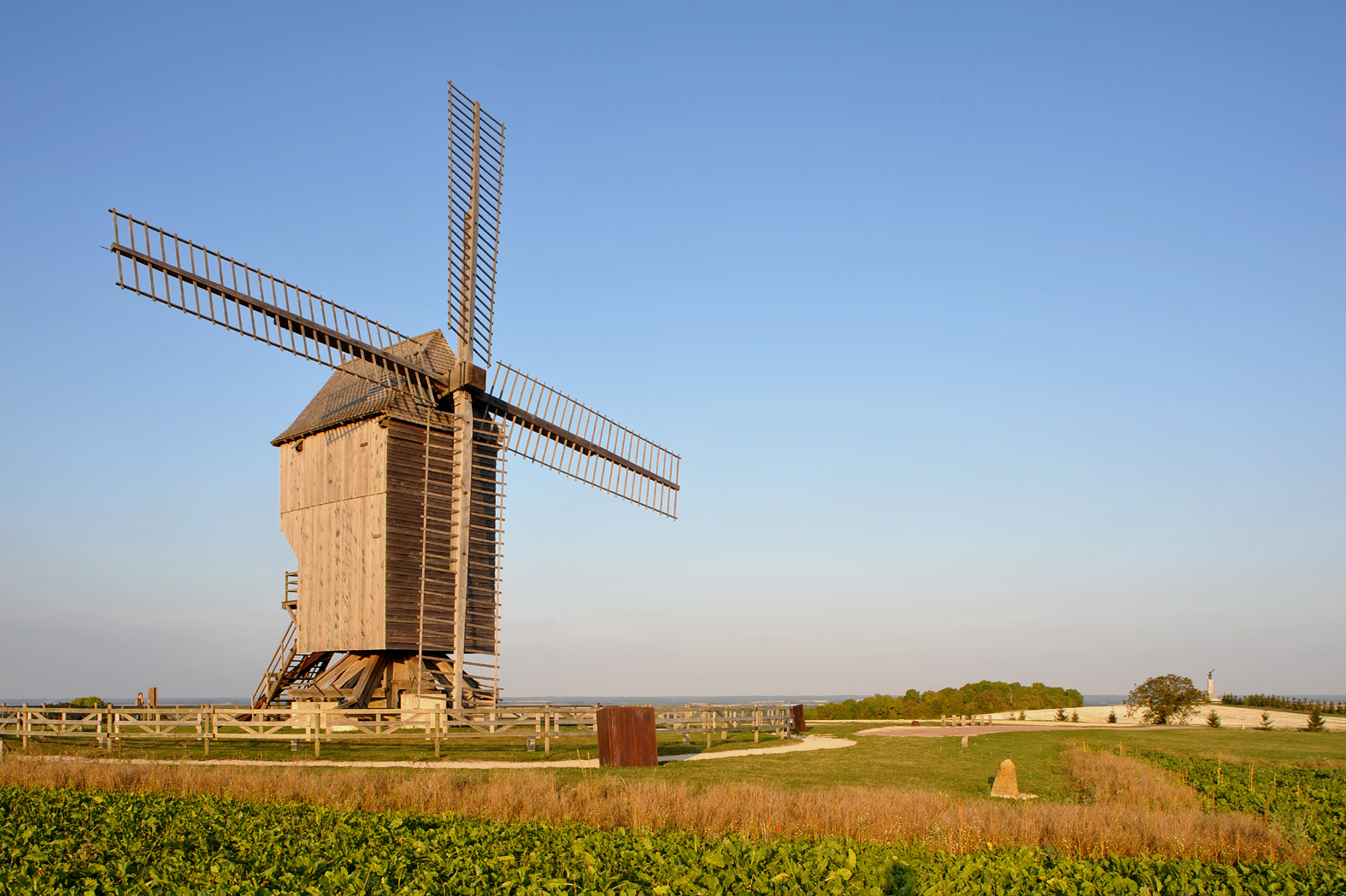
A modern replica of the windmill at Valmy stands amid a memorial site.

In terms of military history the battle introduced features that reshaped modern warfare. It exemplified key components of "total war" in terms of political propaganda, psychological warfare, and eager participation of large numbers of politicized civilians.

After a while the battle came to be celebrated as the first great victory of the armies of the French Revolution. In the varied historiography of the French Revolution, it is typically portrayed as the first victory of a citizen army, inspired by liberty and nationalism. Many thousands of volunteers did indeed swell the ranks, but at least half of the French forces were professional soldiers, particularly among Kellermann's critical artillery units. The French artillery also held a tactical advantage in its modern Gribeauval gun system which proved highly successful on the battlefield. But in popular conception, Valmy was a victory of citizen-soldiers: the battle was emblemized by Kellermann's cry, augmented by the troops' singing of "La Marseillaise" and the "Ça Ira" while under fire.

On the day of the battle, the Legislative Assembly had duly transferred its power to the National Convention. Over the next two days, flush with the news from Valmy, the new Convention deputies abolished the monarchy and proclaimed the French Republic. The victory was a much-needed source of pride for the revolutionary French state, and provided enduring inspiration for the years that followed. It was considered by many contemporaries to be a miraculous event for France, and a "decisive defeat" for one of the most effective armies in Europe. Scholars continue to count it among the most significant clashes in military history.

The Prussians themselves recognized the importance of the battle, not merely as a setback in the war but as a crucial advancement for the Revolution as a whole. The German writer and poet Johann Wolfgang von Goethe, who was present at the battle with the Prussian army, later wrote that he was approached by some of his comrades in a state of dejection. He had previously cheered them up with memorable and clever quotes but his only consolation this time was, "Here and today, a new epoch in the history of the world has begun, and you can boast you were present at its birth."

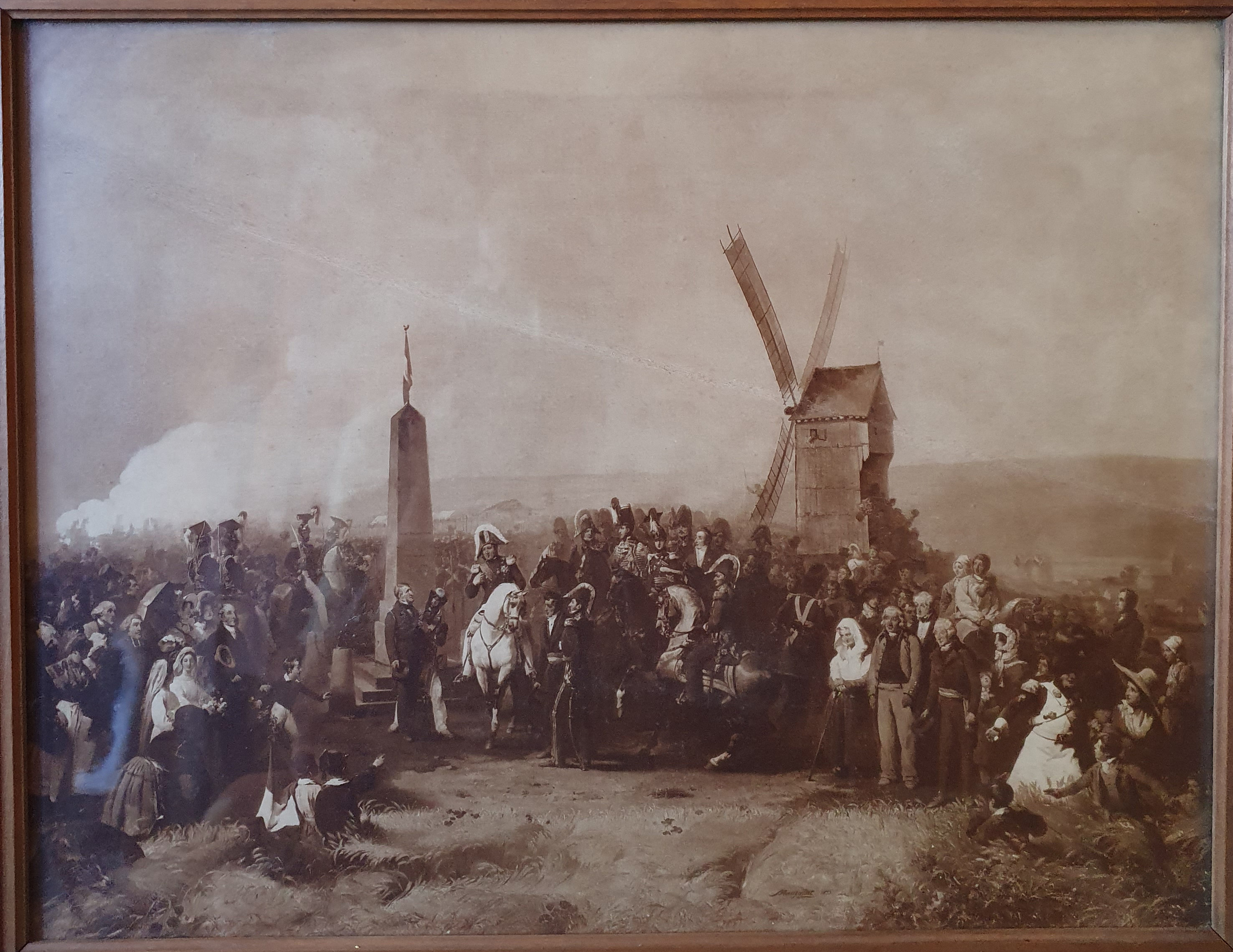
Mauzaisse Jean Baptiste - Louis-Philippe visite le champ de bataille de Valmy - 1837

In command of a brigade of dragoons at the battle was the 18-year-old Louis Philippe, future Duke of Orleans and King of the French. In his official report of the battle, Kellermann singled out the young Louis Philippe for his courage during the cannonade. Decades later, Louis Philippe's military service was used to justify the Orleanist bid for the throne in the immediate aftermath of the July Revolution of 1830. To legitimize himself in the eyes of liberals and nationalists, Louis-Philippe promoted himself as a patriotic citizen-king who had served in the army of the First Republic. He commissioned artworks depicting his military service such as The National Guard of Paris Departs for the Army and Louis-Philippe visiting the battlefield of Valmy.

== Sources ==
- Atkinson, Charles Francis; Hannay, David McDowall (1910). "French Revolutionary Wars" . In Chisholm, Hugh (ed.). Encyclopædia Britannica. Vol. 11 (11th ed.). Cambridge University Press. pp. 171–205, see page 171. "Valmy"
- Azema, Jean-Pierre Henri (1995). Les Moulins de France (in French). Rennes: Fédération Française des Amis des Moulins. ISBN 2-7373-1673-1.
- Blanning, T. C. W. (1996). The French Revolutionary Wars 1787–1802. London: Arnold. ISBN 0-340-64533-4.
- Carlyle, Thomas (1800s) [1837]. The French Revolution: A History. Vol. 3. London: George Routledge and Sons, Ltd. OCLC 461166553.
- Connelly, Owen (2005). The Wars of the French Revolution and Napoleon. London: Routledge. pp. 29–30. ISBN 0-415-23983-4.
- Creasy, Edward Shepherd (1851). The Fifteen Decisive Battles of the World, from Marathon to Waterloo. New York: Harper & Brothers. p. 328. OCLC 5026550. "fifteen decisive battles."
- Crowdy, Terry (15 January 2003). French Revolutionary Infantryman, 1791–1802. Warrior series. Vol. 63. Oxford: Osprey. pp. 8, 24. ISBN 1-84176-552-X.
- Doyle, William (2002). The Oxford History of the French Revolution. Oxford: Oxford University Press. ISBN 978-0-19-925298-5.
- Dunn-Pattinson, Richard P. (2010) [1909]. Napoleon's Marshals. Bremen, Germany: Europaeischer Hochschulverlag GmbH & Co. ISBN 978-3-86741-429-6.
- Esdaile, Charles (2009). Napoleon's Wars: An International History, 1803–1815. New York: Penguin. p. 161. ISBN 978-0-14-311628-8.
- Fuller, J. F. C. (1987) [1954]. A Military History of the Western World. Vol. II. New York: Da Capo Press. ISBN 0-306-80305-4.
- Horne, Alistair (2004). La Belle France. New York: Vintage. ISBN 978-1-4000-3487-1.
- Lanning, Michael Lee (2005). The Battle 100: The Stories Behind History's Most Influential Battles. Chicago: Sourcebooks, Inc. ISBN 1-4022-0263-6.
- Meyer, Élise. "Valmy: The victory and its reputation." Annales historiques de la Revolution francaise. No. 4. 2020. abstract
- Price, Munro (2002). The Fall of the French Monarchy. London: Pan Macmillan Ltd. ISBN 0-330-48827-9.
- Schama, Simon (1989). Citizens: A Chronicle of the French Revolution. New York: Vintage Books. ISBN 0-679-72610-1.
- Soboul, Albert (1975). The French Revolution 1787–1799. New York: Vintage. ISBN 0-394-71220-X.
- Thiers, Adolphe (1838). The History of the French Revolution. Vol. II. London: Richard Bentley. OCLC 2949605.
- Tucker, Spencer C. (2010). Battles That Changed History: An Encyclopedia of World Conflict. Oxford: ABC-CLIO. ISBN 978-1-59884-429-0.
- Wainwright, E. H. "The cannonade of Valmy." Kleio 5.2 (1973): 62–76.
- Webster, Nesta Helen (1919). The French Revolution: A Study in Democracy. New York: E.P. Dutton & Co. ISBN 0-7661-7996-6.

Preceded by Siege of Thionville (1792)	French Revolution: Revolutionary campaigns Battle of Valmy	Succeeded by Column of the Goddess
