= Jeux Descartes =

Boardgame publisher

Jeux Descartes was a French publisher of roleplaying games and board games. Their most popular lines included: Eurogames, a set of serious board games, previously published by Duccio Vitale's independent company; Blue Games, small card games for larger groups; and Games for Two.

Jeux Descartes was founded in 1977 and went out of business in 2005. Their assets are now owned by former rival Asmodée Éditions, and are sold under the Descartes Editeur imprint.

== Products ==
=== Role-playing games ===
- Malefices (1985-1994): An investigative horror roleplaying game set in Belle Époque France.
- L'Appel de Cthulhu (1984-2005): A French translation of the Second Edition Call of Cthulhu rules.

=== Wargames ===
- Napoléon à Austerlitz (1977): A simulation of the Napoleonic Battle of Austerlitz
- 1870 (1978): A division-level wargame simulating the Franco-Prussian War.
- Amirauté (1979): A set of tactical or strategic ship-level World War II naval warfare miniatures rules. The rules simulated ship-to-ship combat, torpedoes, naval bombardment, and naval aviation.
- Dune (1979): A wargame based on the Dune book series. Players play one of the factions: Bene Gesserit, Emperor Shaddam IV, Fremen, House Atreides, House Harkonnen or the Spacing Guild.
- Friedland (1980)
- La Bataille de Valmy (1981): A Napoleonic simulation of the Battle of Valmy
- Bataille de la Marne 1914 (1982)
- 2ème D.B. 'I' Normandie (1983)
- Ave Tenebrae
- Les Aigles (1990): A set of Napoleonic Wars miniatures rules. The Boxed Set edition (1987) came with the wargame rule booklet and cardboard scenery pieces that could be assembled. The Rule Book edition (1990) was just the rules booklet by itself. The Supplement Number 1 (1990) came with army lists for Austria and Russia, 14 scenarios, and colored cardboard unit chits.
- Serenissima: An economy and warfare simulation set in an Italian seaport during the Renaissance.
- Guet-Apens
