= Jean-Mathieu-Philibert Sérurier =

French Marshal (1742–1819)

Marshal of the Empire Jean-Mathieu Sérurier Count of the Empire
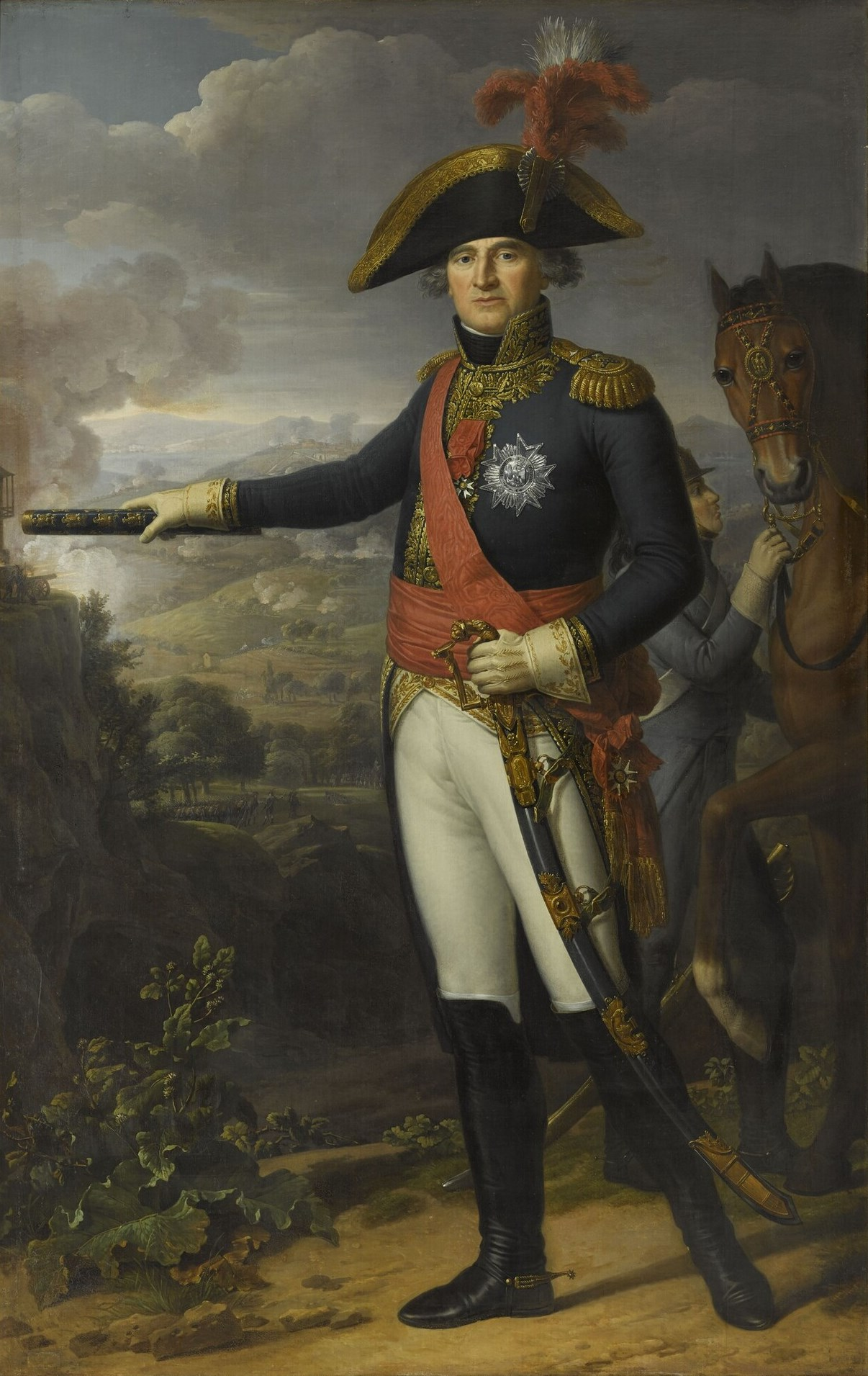
- Portrait by Jean-Louis Laneuville
- Born: 8 December 1742; Laon, France
- Died: 21 December 1819 (aged 77); Paris, France
- Military career
- Allegiance: France
- Branch: Army
- Service years: 1755–1819
- Rank: Marshal of the Empire
- Conflicts: See list: Seven Years' War; Battle of Warburg; Spanish–Portuguese War; War of the First Coalition; Alps Campaign (1792-1796); Battle of Saorgio; Battle of Loano; Battle of Mondovì; Siege of Mantua; Battle of La Favorita; Battle of Valvasone; War of the Second Coalition; Battle of Verona; Battle of Magnano; Battle of Cassano; Napoleonic Wars
- Awards: Grand Cross of the Legion of Honour; Order of Saint-Louis; Order of the Iron Crown
- Other work: Sénat conservateur, 1799; Count of the Empire, 1808; Governor of Les Invalides, (1804–1815)

Jean-Mathieu-Philibert, comte Sérurier (English: /sɛruːriˈeɪ/ seh-roo-ree-AY, French: [ʒɑ̃ matjø filibɛʁ seʁyʁje], 8 December 1742 – 21 December 1819) led a division in the War of the First Coalition and became a Marshal of the Empire under Emperor Napoleon. He was born into the minor nobility and in 1755 joined the Laon militia which was soon sent to fight in the Seven Years' War. After transferring into the regular army as an ensign, he was wounded at Warburg in 1760. He fought in the Spanish-Portuguese War in 1762. He married in 1779 after a promotion to captain. A newly minted major in 1789, the French Revolution sped up promotion so that he was colonel of the regiment in 1792. After leading Army of Italy troops in a number of actions, he became a general of brigade in 1793 and a general of division the following year.

Sérurier led a division in Napoleon Bonaparte's Italian campaign of 1796, except during bouts of illness. He especially distinguished himself at the Battle of Mondovì and the Siege of Mantua. In 1799, he again fought in Italy during the War of the Second Coalition at Verona, Magnano and Cassano, being captured in the latter action. After being paroled, he supported Napoleon's rise to political power in the Coup of 18 Brumaire in late 1799. The apex of his career occurred on 19 May 1804 when Napoleon appointed him a Marshal of the Empire. His active military career over, Sérurier served in the French Senate and was ennobled by Napoleon. In 1814, as the First French Empire was crumbling, he burned all the many flags captured by the French armies to keep them from falling into the enemy's hands. His troops called him the "Virgin of Italy" for his rigorous standards of discipline and honesty, in contrast to an army known for generals who enriched themselves by plundering the occupied territories. His surname is one of the names inscribed on the Arc de Triomphe, listed first on Column 24 before Murat.

== Early life ==
Sérurier was born at Laon on 8 December 1742, the son of Mathieu-Guillaume Sérurier. The family formed part of the minor provincial nobility, his father holding the title Seigneur de Sort and the job of mole-catcher to the king's breeding stud. After 1750 his father's title became Seigneur de Saint-Gobert. Sérurier got a good education and was of sober character. He received a commission as lieutenant in the Laon militia battalion on 25 March 1755, his uncle being the unit's commander. He transferred to the Soissons militia battalion on 12 June 1758. When he heard that the Laon battalion was called to serve in the Seven Years' War he switched back to his old unit on 30 November 1758. After sustaining a bayonet wound, he transferred into the Mazarin Infantry Regiment as a cadet on 1 October 1759. At the Battle of Warburg on 31 July 1760, Duke Ferdinand of Brunswick-Wolfenbüttel surprised the French under Louis Nicolas Victor de Felix d'Ollieres, Count Du Muy. While defending a critical post, Sérurier was hit on the right side of his face by a bullet, which broke his jaw and left a lasting scar. The injury also cost him most of his teeth. He was promoted to second lieutenant on 25 April 1762.

Sérurier's regiment was ordered to Bayonne where it joined a force under Charles Juste de Beauvau, Prince of Craon. These troops entered Spain on 3 June 1762 to take part in the Spanish-Portuguese War. The first battalion, in which Sérurier served, participated in the siege of Almeida which fell to the Franco-Spanish on 25 August 1762. The unit returned to France in November that year and after the Treaty of Paris was renamed the Beauce Regiment. After the peace Sérurier was demoted to sous-lieutenant and spent six years as a drill instructor. He was promoted to second lieutenant again on 21 February 1767 and was shipped to Corsica in 1770. The Republic of Genoa transferred Corsica to France in 1764 but Pasquale Paoli led an insurrection against the occupiers which resulted in a few skirmishes. His superiors called Sérurier an "excellent officer" but he was not promoted to first lieutenant until 28 February 1778. A year later he was promoted to captain. He married Louise-Marie-Madeleine Itasse on 3 July 1779. Her father was the Registrar of the bail bondsmen of Laon.

On 29 July 1781 Sérurier was awarded the Order of Saint-Louis. On 10 May 1782 he assumed the rank of captain commandant and on 1 June 1783 he took command of the regiment's Chasseur company. Irked by the lack of promotion, he asked to retire on pension on 8 September 1788. His commanding officer argued to retain such a good officer and Sérurier transferred into the Médoc Regiment as a major on 17 May 1789. He became lieutenant colonel on 1 January 1791. Since the French Revolution the garrison at Perpignan became agitated so the regiment was sent there to calm down the other troops. Instead, the Médoc Regiment itself became affected by the troubles. On 23 July 1791, fearing that Sérurier was about to leave the country with the regiment's colors, a body of soldiers removed them from his quarters. In January 1792, 19 officers from the regiment emigrated to Spain. A story existed that Sérurier and a companion tried to flee to Spain but were nearly caught by a patrol and only his companion made it across the border. In June 1792 the Médoc, renamed the 70th Infantry Regiment, marched to the Camp of Tournoux in the Alps. Sérurier became the commanding officer of the 70th with the rank of colonel on 7 August 1792.

== French Revolutionary Wars ==
=== 1792–94 ===
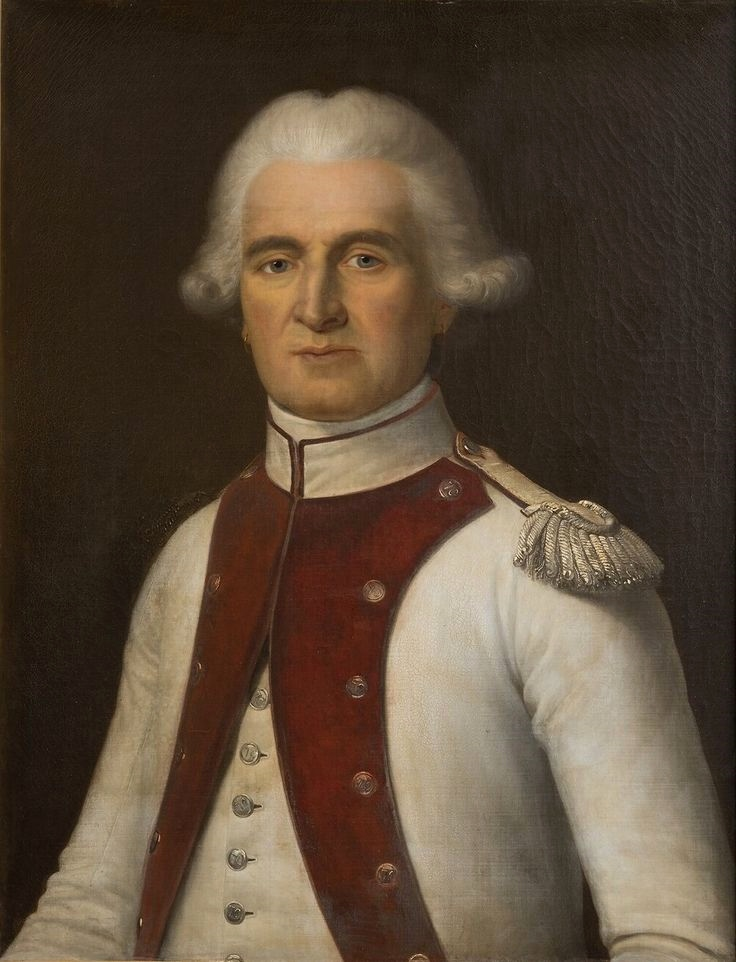
Sérurier in 1792

On 29 September 1792, a 10,000-man division under Jacques Bernard d'Anselme crossed the Var River and occupied Nice, then part of the Kingdom of Sardinia. This force was part of the Army of the Midi which was split on 1 October 1792, with the troops on the Alpine front becoming the Army of the Alps. On 7 November d'Anselme's division became the Army of Italy, which included the 70th Regiment. At about this time Sérurier was arrested for harboring royalist sentiments, but Paul Barras got his rank restored. On 19 May 1793, the new army commander Gaspard Jean-Baptiste Brunet sent him with a column to occupy Saint-Sauveur-sur-Tinée. Sérurier moved north up the Tinée River and captured Isola on the 21st. With 3,000 troops, he attacked the Col de Raus west of Belvédère but was repulsed on 8 June. During the First Battle of Saorgio he led a major attack on the Massif de l'Authion on 12 June, but it was defeated with losses of 280 dead and 1,252 wounded. At the end of July Brunet made another assault on Massif de l'Authion while Sérurier attacked the Col de Raus again but both efforts failed. The representatives on mission were pleased with Sérurier's performance and nominated him general of brigade on 25 June; the promotion was confirmed on 22 August 1793. Meanwhile, Brunet was arrested and executed on 15 November 1793.

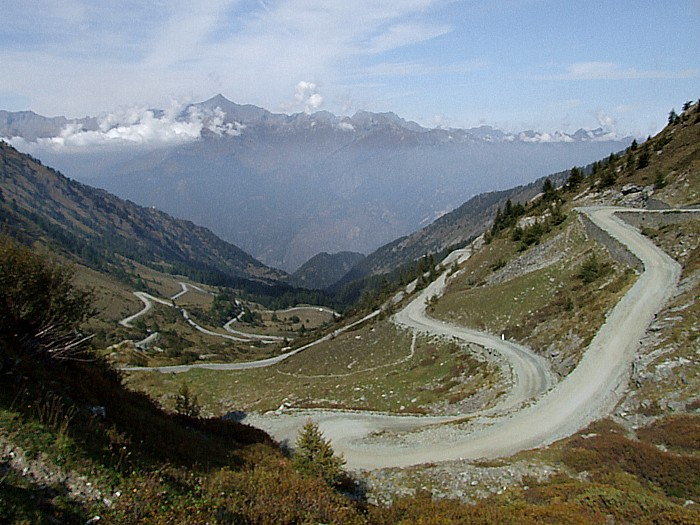
Colle delle Finestre

In September 1793 the Sardinian army tried to recapture the County of Nice. The French right flank held its ground, but on the left Sérurier gave up the east bank of the Vésubie River and fell back to Utelle on 10 September. Jacques François Dugommier took command of the left wing three days later and Sérurier took charge of the right wing of the Army of the Alps at Entrevaux. Sérurier was arrested for retreating too much and for being of noble blood. He was reinstated after the representatives on mission and the War Minister Jean Baptiste Noël Bouchotte termed the charges as unimportant while the citizens of Laon sent a petition vouching for his patriotism. After the fighting petered out in the December snow, Sérurier's division was transferred to form the left flank of the Army of Italy. In January 1794 he was denounced for listening to aristocratic songs and for not caring about desertions, but Bouchotte and the representatives brushed aside these charges. Under army commander Pierre Jadart Dumerbion a French offensive began on 5 April and Oneglia was seized. André Masséna commanded the 20,000-man main column on the right wing while François Macquard directed the center division and Pierre Dominique Garnier led the left division. Sérurier, who commanded Garnier's left brigade, reoccupied Isola and went on to seize the Colle delle Finestre against weak resistance. In the Second Battle of Saorgio on 24 April 1794, Masséna defeated Michelangelo Alessandro Colli-Marchi, the French inflicting 2,800 casualties on the Sardinians while losing 1,500 killed and wounded. In the aftermath, Macquard occupied Saorge and the Col de Tende while Masséna held Ormea in the Tanaro valley. At the end of June, Sérurier took part in a small operation in the Valle Stura di Demonte.

In September 1794 the Sardinians and Austrians advanced to Carcare, threatening to cut the French link to Genoa, where supplies were obtained. Advised by his artillery chief Napoleon Bonaparte, Dumerbion struck back on 15 September. While Sérurier feinted at Vinadio on the left and Macquard feinted at Limone Piemonte in the center, Masséna mounted the main thrust on the right. In the First Battle of Dego on 21 September, 18,000 French troops beat Olivier, Count of Wallis and 8,000 Austro-Sardinians. Though the allies escaped encirclement, the French later seized the port of Vado Ligure. Dumerbion and Garnier both recommended Sérurier's promotion and he was nominated general of division on 22 December 1794. Given command of the right flank division in place of Masséna who was sick, his brigadiers were Barthélemy Catherine Joubert and Sextius Alexandre François de Miollis.

=== 1795 ===
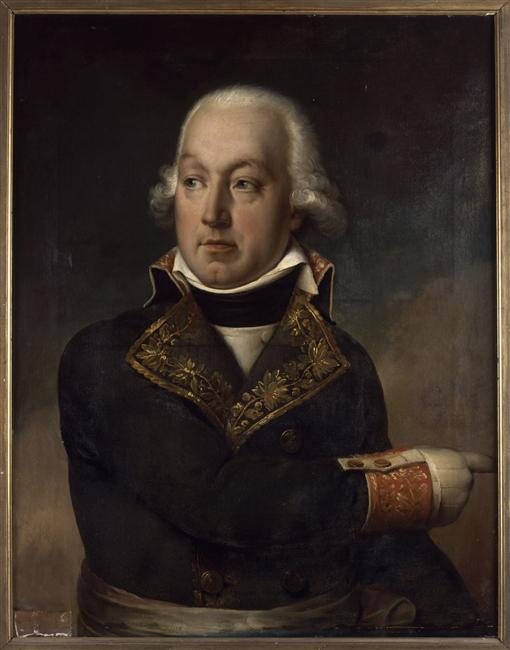
Barthélemy Scherer

On 4 November 1794, Barthélemy Louis Joseph Schérer replaced the ill Dumerbion as army commander. Schérer wrote that Sérurier was "a very good officer, devoted to his duties; his patriotism has been attacked in the time of Hébert and his consorts; he has emerged victorious from all these charges. In my opinion he is worthy of the post he holds on the right of the active army." Sérurier's promotion was not confirmed until 13 June 1795. The Austro-Sardinian commander Joseph Nikolaus De Vins attacked the French lines on 24 June. Most of the assaults failed but since a few positions were captured and could not be retaken, the French withdrew from Vado to Borghetto Santo Spirito by 5 July. In the new line, Masséna with 14,000 troops held the coast while Sérurier and 6,000 men defended Ormea. On 5 July Sérurier reported that a key position had been partly lost, causing consternation at army headquarters. Later that day he reported that one of his brigadiers, Louis Pelletier, retook the position. Curiously, this incident did not count against him; instead Sérurier was given command of the left wing in place of Garnier. On the evening of 31 August, his headquarters at Saint-Martin-Vésubie was surrounded by the enemy. Though only 318 soldiers were at hand, Sérurier resisted successfully until early the following morning when he attacked and scattered his attackers, capturing 86 of them. The enemy commander, the émigré Chevalier Bonnaud committed suicide. Not only was he a good soldier, but Sérurier's troops liked him, he treated the local civilians with decency and his diplomacy allowed him to serve as a link between his army and the neighboring Army of the Alps. François Christophe Kellermann then in command of both armies, wrote, "It is to the coolness and courage of this excellent officer that was due the success of this glorious day."

On 23–24 November 1795, the Battle of Loano was fought. Schérer deployed Pierre Augereau with 6,961 troops on the right, Masséna with 13,276 men in the center and Sérurier with 5,155 soldiers on the left. The plan called for Sérurier to pin down the Allied right while Masséna broke through the center and rolled up the Allied left with the help of Augereau. By luck, Wallis replaced De Vins in command of the Allies on 22 November. That day Sérurier's attack on the Colle San Bernardo was repulsed but it tied down Colli's division. The plan was carried out with success. Masséna and Augereau both defeated the forces in front of them. The Austro-Sardinians suffered losses of 3,000 killed and wounded, 4,000 prisoners, 48 guns and five colors while French losses numbered 2,500 killed and wounded and 500 captured. Snow soon compelled both armies to withdraw into winter quarters. The French soldiers were in a wretched state, with very little food; they became insubordinate and the generals quarreled. Sérurier got into a dispute with Schérer and nearly left the army. On 18 March 1796 Sérurier's division refused to obey orders.

=== 1796 ===
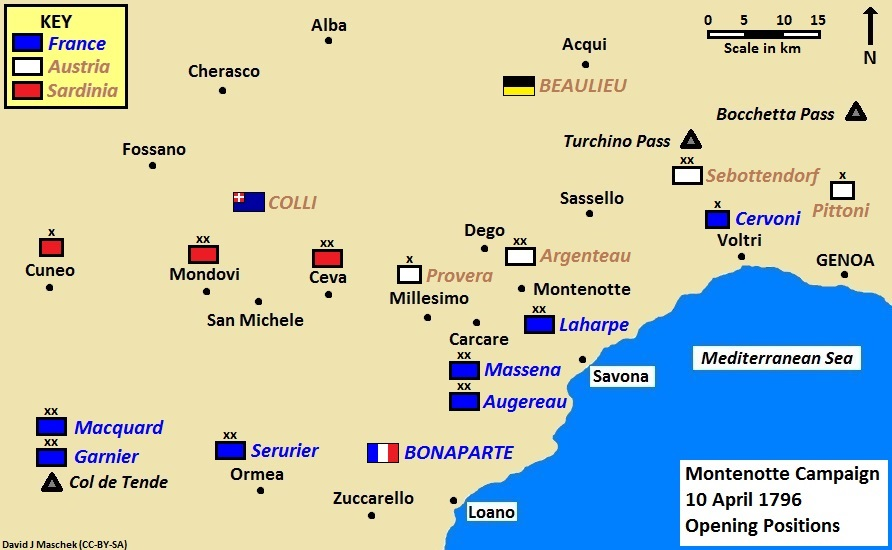
Situation map of the Montenotte Campaign, 10 April 1796

After the winter campaign, Schérer placed the divisions in the positions where they would start the 1796 campaign. From right to left, they were Masséna with two divisions on the coast, Augereau on the Bormida River, Sérurier on the Tanaro, Macquard at the Col de Tende and Garnier on the far left. On 27 March 1796 Bonaparte arrived to take command of the Army of Italy. At this date Sérurier was 53 years old with 40 years of military service. He applied to retire on a pension due to his age, health and wounds, but after meeting Bonaparte he decided to stay. Masséna later wrote that Bonaparte did not impress his generals at first. Then the new commander put on his hat and sharply questioned them; the generals went away believing that they had a true leader at last. Bonaparte's plan was to mass over 20,000 men under Masséna and Augereau near Carcare where the Austrian and Sardinian armies linked. Sérurier's division would join the others near Ceva as they moved west. His 9,448-strong division consisted of the 39th, 69th and 85th Line Infantry Demi-brigades.

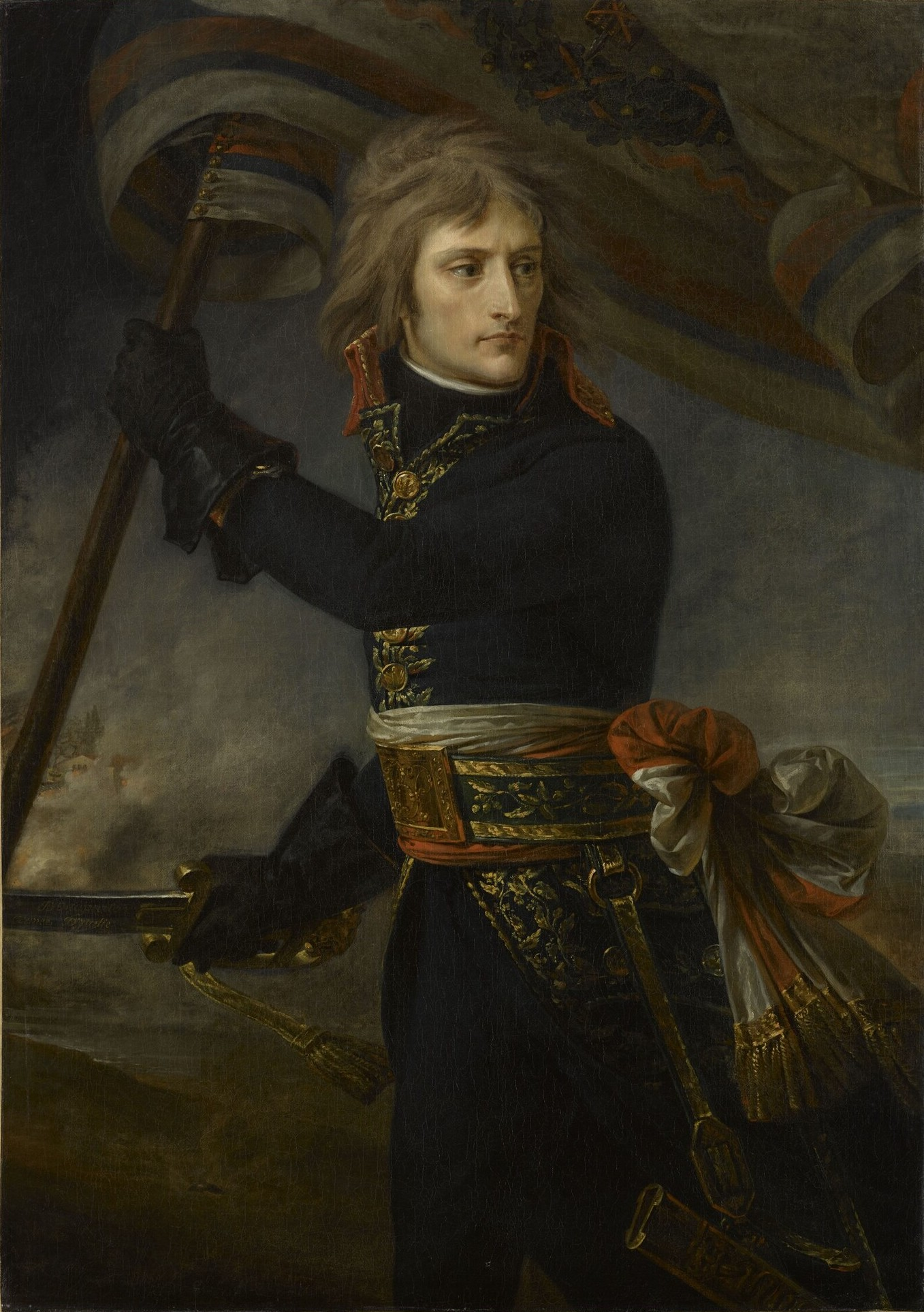
Napoleon Bonaparte

In the Montenotte Campaign, the French won victories at Montenotte, Millesimo and Dego between 11 and 15 April. In the Battle of Ceva Colli's Sardinians repelled Augereau's attack but they retreated to the west when Sérurier's division appeared. Colli detailed Jean-Gaspard Dichat de Toisinge with 8,000 Sardinians and 15 guns to defend San Michele Mondovi against a French attack. On 19 April, Sérurier formed his division into two 3,000-man brigades under Pascal Antoine Fiorella and Jean Joseph Guieu plus a reserve under his personal command. The Corsaglia River was unfordable due to the spring thaw and the French attack soon stalled. However, some of Guieu's skirmishers found an unguarded footbridge and made a lodgement on the west bank. The French captured San Michele but the unpaid, hungry soldiers went on a looting spree. Led by a company of Swiss troops, Colli organized a counterattack which drove Sérurier's division out of the town, though Guieu's brigade maintained its bridgehead. The repulse cost the French about 600 casualties while the Sardinians lost 300.

Colli's troops withdrew toward Mondovì on the night of 20 April, but the move was soon discovered by the French who caught up with them at Vicoforte at mid-morning. In the Battle of Mondovì on 21 April, the brigades of Fiorella, Guieu and Elzéar Auguste Cousin de Dommartin fought their way into Vicoforte and routed the Sardinians. Dichat was killed and Henri Christian Michel de Stengel mortally wounded. Mondovì surrendered in the late afternoon. There was no looting but large requisitions of food were made from the town. Auguste de Marmont recalled of Sérurier, "To form his men into three columns, put himself at the head of the central one, throw out a cloud of skirmishers, and march at the double, sword in hand, ten paces in front of his column: that is what he did. A fine spectacle, that of an old general, resolute and decided, whose vigor was revived by the presence of the enemy. I accompanied him in this attack, the success of which was complete". On 28 April the Armistice of Cherasco was signed, taking Sardinia out of the war.

In May 1796, Bonaparte detailed Sérurier to demonstrate with his division at Valenza while the rest of the army crossed the Po River near Piacenza. After the Battle of Lodi, Bonaparte divided the Army of Italy into a cavalry reserve and four divisions including one under Sérurier. During the Battle of Borghetto on 30 May, his division feinted at the upper Mincio River while other troops made the main thrust against Johann Peter Beaulieu's army at Valeggio sul Mincio. On 1 June, the 4,700-strong division took position on the north side of the fortress of Mantua. On 8 June, Sérurier, artillerist Augustin de Lespinasse and engineer Francois, marquis de Chasseloup-Laubat reconnoitered the fortress. Two days later Bonaparte put Sérurier in charge of the Siege of Mantua with about 8,000 soldiers. Soon after, Bonaparte wrote to the French Directory, "I shall not speak to you of the conduct of the intrepid General Sérurier, whose military reputation is established, and to whom we owe, amongst other things since the campaign began, the victory of Mondovi". Because of the approach of Dagobert Sigmund von Wurmser's Austrian army, the siege was raised on 31 July, the heavy cannons were buried and the division withdrew behind the Oglio River. Sérurier then became feverish with malaria, so that Fiorella and Gaspard Amédée Gardanne directed the division during the Battle of Castiglione. The general returned to France to recuperate. On 14 August 1796 Bonaparte wrote a confidential assessment of his generals to the Directory. In it he wrote, "Sérurier, fights like a private, takes nothing on himself, firm; has not a good enough opinion of his troops, is ill".

=== 1797 ===
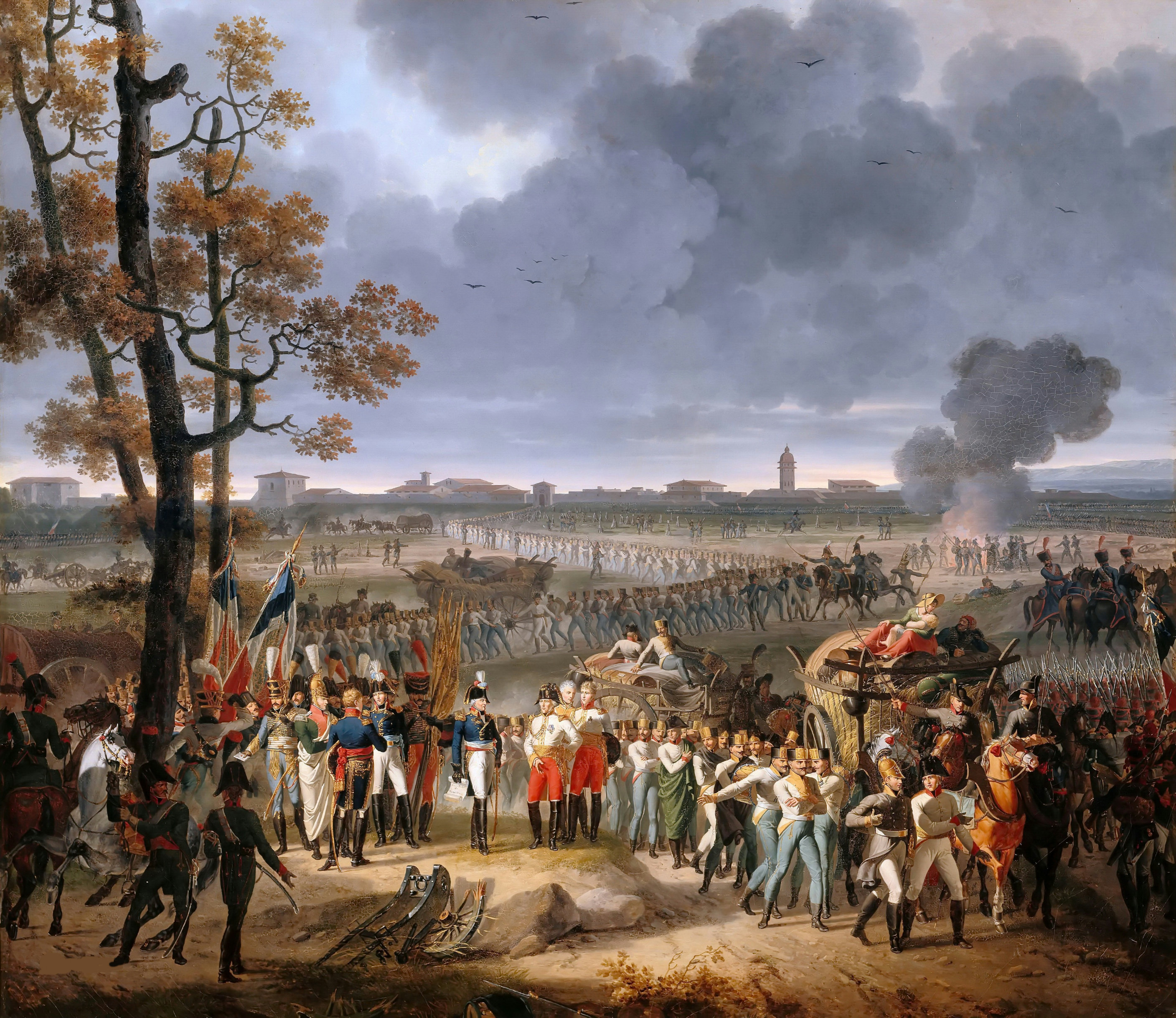
Wurmser surrendering Mantua to Sérurier

After his recovery Sérurier took command at Livorno (Leghorn) but he was thrilled to get the order to return to the army. On 27 December 1796 he resumed command of the Mantua siege corps, replacing Charles Edward Jennings de Kilmaine who had also become ill. The corps consisted of 10,000 men in two divisions under Thomas-Alexandre Dumas and Claude Dallemagne. On 14–15 January 1797 Bonaparte defeated József Alvinczi in the Battle of Rivoli, inflicting terrible losses on the Austrians. Meanwhile, a relief column under Giovanni Marchese di Provera reached the north side of Mantua and on 16 January there was a battle. The Mantua garrison launched a sortie led by Karl Philipp Sebottendorf that made progress at first but was beaten back by reinforcements under Claude Perrin Victor. At the same time, Sérurier and 1,500 troops at La Favorita Palace blocked Provera from joining the garrison. By noon Provera was hemmed in by French reinforcements and at 2:00 pm he surrendered to Sérurier with 7,000 men, 22 field guns, a pontoon train and a food convoy. Afterward, Sérurier got into a dispute with Dumas, who had commanded armies but was now a mere division commander. Angry that his contributions were not recognized, Dumas sent an abusive note to the army chief of staff Louis-Alexandre Berthier and was demoted by Bonaparte. On 30 January, Wurmser began negotiations with Sérurier for the capitulation of Mantua; this was signed on 2 February 1797 by the two generals. The articles permitted Wurmser, his staff, his generals, 700 soldiers and six artillery pieces to go free, but 16,324 men of the garrison became prisoners of war.

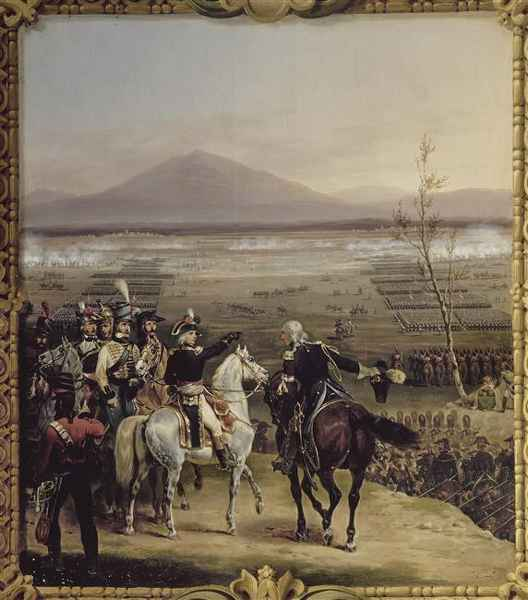
The Battle of Valvasone

For the spring 1797 campaign, Bonaparte organized his army into eight divisions of which the 3rd Division under Sérurier counted 6,543 soldiers. In the Battle of Valvasone on 16 March, Bonaparte drove back the rear guard of Archduke Charles, Duke of Teschen. During the operation Sérurier's division was in reserve, but in the subsequent advance it was on the right flank while Jean-Baptiste Bernadotte's division was in the center and Guieu's division was on the left flank. On 19 March Bernadotte attacked Gradisca d'Isonzo and was repulsed. After Sérurier's division swung around the south side of Gradisca and gained the heights in the rear of the town, the garrison surrendered. The French captured four battalions of Austrian infantry totaling 2,500 soldiers, 10 guns and eight colors. While Bernadotte continued advancing to the east, Guieu's division followed by Sérurier turned north in pursuit of a column under Adam Bajalics von Bajahaza. At this time Sérurier fell ill and command of his division passed to Louis François Jean Chabot. Trapped between Massena and Guieu, Bajalics was forced to surrender with 4,000 men in the Battle of Tarvis. After recovering, Sérurier resumed command of his division at Graz on 20 April and after the Treaty of Leoben the unit withdrew from Austria and took position at Sacile.

On 3 June 1797 Bonaparte notified the French government that he was sending Sérurier with 22 captured colors. He wrote that he, "has in the last two campaigns displayed as much talent as bravery and patriotism ... General Sérurier is extremely severe with himself: he is sometimes so with others. A strict friend of discipline, and of the order and virtues most necessary to the maintenance of society, he disdains intrigue and intriguers, which has sometimes made him enemies amongst those men who are always ready to accuse of unpatriotism any one who wishes to see them submitted to their superiors". He was received in Paris by a large audience of government officials on 28 June who he assured of his loyalty and that of his soldiers. He was back with his division on 9 August and missed the Coup of 18 Fructidor. A little later Louis Desaix described him, "tall, 55 years old ... honest, estimable in every respect, considered to be an aristocrat but supported by General Bonaparte, who values and admires him". Venice was occupied by French troops but by the recent treaty was to be handed over to Austria. Bonaparte ordered Sérurier to carry out the unpleasant job of removing all military stores and ships as well as all works of art. Over the objection of the Austrians and the inhabitants, the city was thoroughly plundered. Although he was the target of anger and abuse, Sérurier did not personally benefit from the looting and did his best to prevent others from doing so. He confiscated the salt and biscuits in the Venice arsenal but that was to raise money to pay his soldiers. In the same army, Masséna and Augereau were notorious for looting for personal gain, and many lesser officers also did it. Sérurier earned such a reputation for honesty that his soldiers called him the "Virgin of Italy".

=== 1798–99 ===
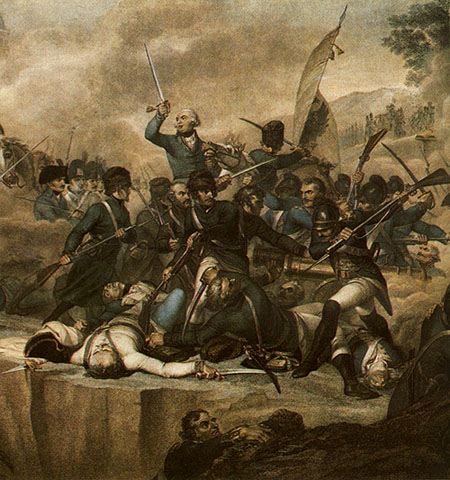
Sérurier's division was captured during the Battle of Cassano.

Early in 1798 Sérurier temporarily commanded the divisions left in Italy where he had his hands full trying to calm unpaid soldiers who were on the verge of mutiny. Bonaparte did not take him on the French campaign in Egypt and Syria because he was too old. Sometime after February 1798, he was ordered to the Army of England where he made his headquarters at Rennes. On 15 September he became Inspector General of the troops in the interior of France. On 5 November 1798 he transferred back to Italy to serve under Army of Italy commander Joubert. Sérurier was ordered by Joubert to occupy Livorno, but instructions soon changed to invade the Republic of Lucca. His cavalry entered Lucca on 22 December 1798 and extorted large sums of cash and clothing for the army's use. Sérurier's 6,000 infantry arrived at the city on 2 January 1799. After declaring that Lucca was a French-style republic on 25 January, he handed it over to Miollis on 5 February and returned to Mantua. At that time, the Army of Italy was led by Schérer who gave Sérurier command of the Tyrol Division with a paper strength of 8,328 men.

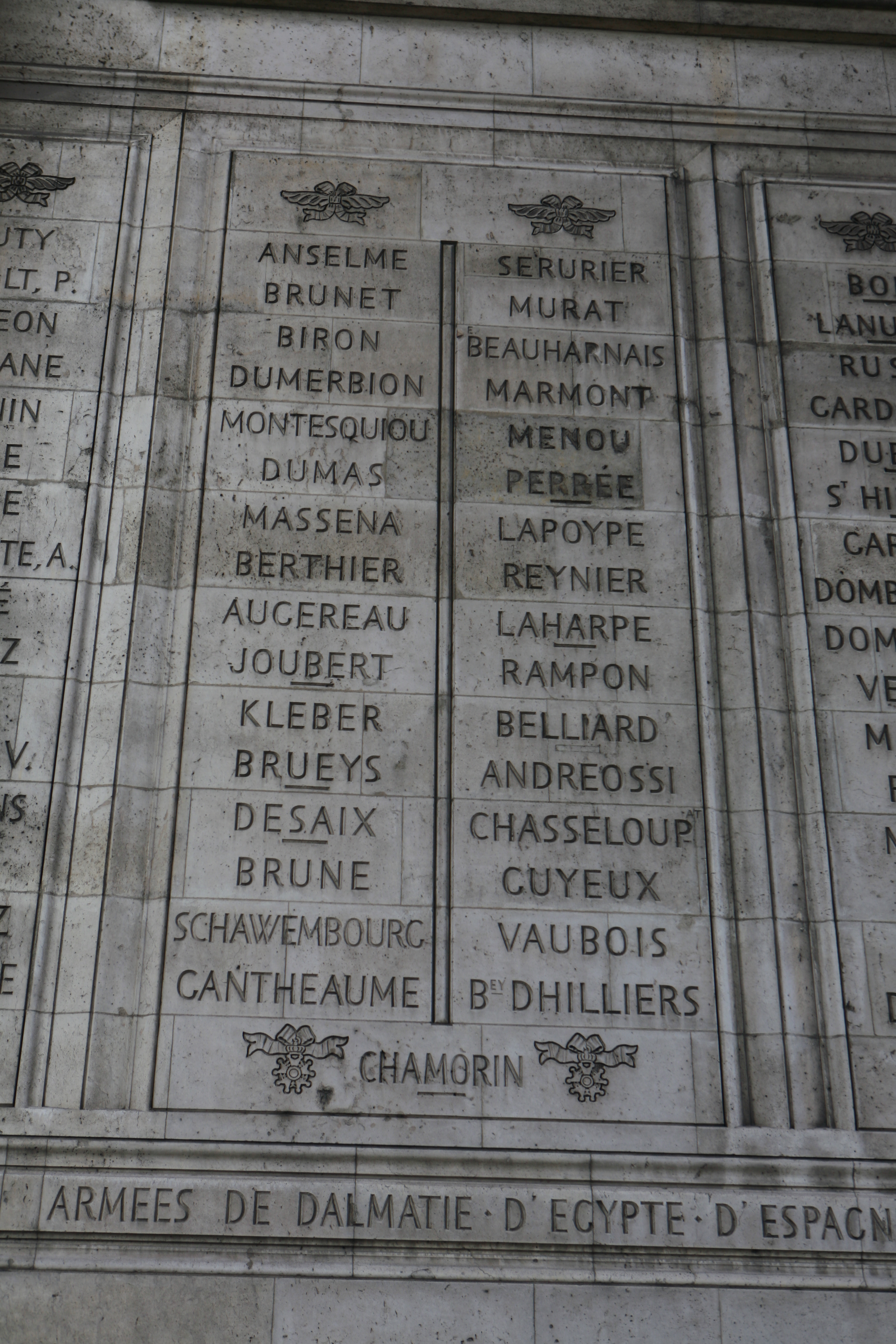
Sérurier is name 1 on Column 24.

The outbreak of the War of the Second Coalition saw Schérer with 43,000 troops facing Paul Kray with 50,700 Austrians near Verona and 24,551 Russians under Alexander Suvorov marching up in support. Hoping to maul Kray before his Russians allies arrived, Schérer opted to attack. On 26 March 1799 in the Battle of Verona, the French gained a success at Pastrengo in the north, fought to a draw in front of Verona and were drubbed in the south at Legnago. In the north Sérurier drove the Austrians from Rivoli Veronese. On the 27th Kray rapidly shifted his strength to the north to assist his outnumbered right wing. Schérer shuffled the positions of his divisions which exhausted the soldiers without accomplishing anything. Belatedly, Schérer tried push his advantage in the north by sending Sérurier with 6,000 troops to advance on Verona from the north. On 30 March he ran into 15,000 Austrians at Parona and was badly defeated, losing 600 killed and wounded and 1,177 prisoners. Austrian casualties numbered only 390.

The Battle of Magnano on 5 April 1799 resulted in a French defeat. In the fighting Sérurier's division included three battalions each of the 18th, 29th and 30th Light Infantry Demi brigades, one battalion of the 1st Light, 180 grenadiers, 850 cavalry and 60 gunners. Both armies advanced, Sérurier successfully capturing Villafranca on the left. However, the divisions of Claude Perrin Victor and Paul Grenier were routed on the right. The French lost 7,000–8,000 men, seven colors and eight cannons, while Kray's army sustained 5,228 casualties. The worst casualty was the confidence of the French generals and the morale of the troops. When Schérer found that 12,000 Austrians were marching from the County of Tyrol to turn his north flank, he withdrew from the line of the Mincio, leaving 12,000 soldiers to defend Mantua. During the retreat many Italian and Swiss allies deserted from the Army of Italy.

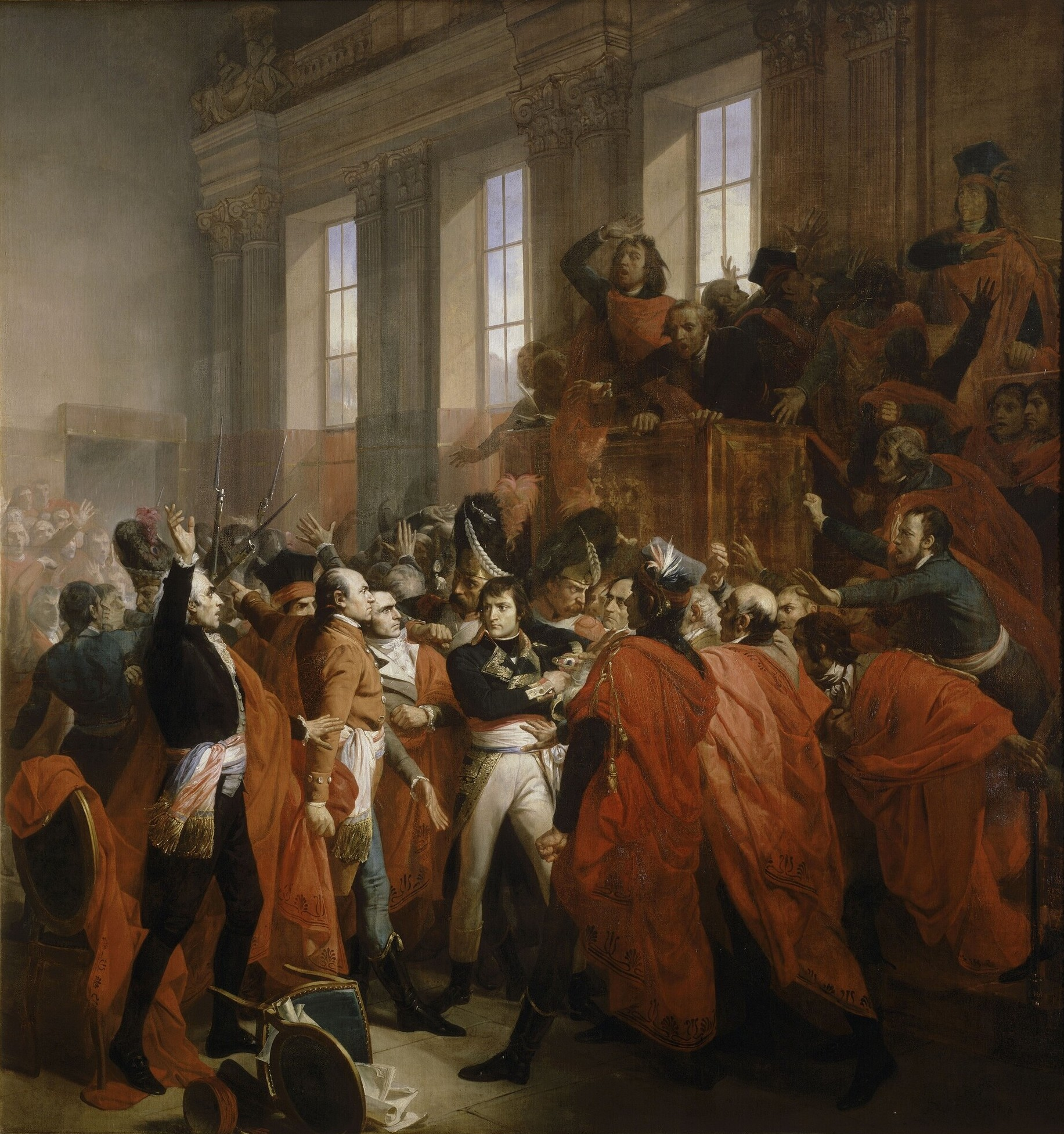
The Coup of 18 Brumaire

By the end of April 1799, Schérer had 28,000 troops behind the Adda River, strung out on a line 115 kilometres (71 mi) in length. The army was arranged in three small corps under Sérurier on the left, Grenier in the center and Victor on the right. By the morning of 27 April, Suvorov's Austro-Russian army had won crossings over the Adda at Capriate San Gervasio and Brivio. That day Jean Victor Marie Moreau replaced Schérer in command of the Army of Italy and the Allies defeated the French in the Battle of Cassano. After a struggle, Grenier's soldiers were beaten at Trezzo while the Austrians broke through Victor's defenses at Cassano. The French withdrew toward Milan leaving Sérurier isolated and without orders between Trezzo and Brivio. During the night the old veteran entrenched 2,600–4,000 troops in an all-around defense near Verderio. Finding the French in his path, Josef Philipp Vukassovich split his division into three columns and enveloped Sérurier's position. Vukassovich reported that his enemies put up a "desperate" fight, but out of ammunition, Sérurier surrendered on the evening of 28 April. By the terms of the capitulation, the general and his officers were released on parole to France. The Austrians reported capturing 243 officers and 3,487 soldiers. Vukassovich's troops suffered 2,750 casualties, over half of the Allied losses at Cassano. Sérurier's left wing near Lake Como escaped and rejoined the main army.

Suvorov invited the captured general to dinner and found it impossible to coax any military information from him. The Russian wondered why such a reputable man should be fighting for the French First Republic. Sérurier retorted, "My father, in giving me my sword, expressly ordered me to use it only to defend my country". Historian Ramsay Weston Phipps considered Verderio to be the biggest blunder of Sérurier's career. He suggested that the general was accustomed to seeing Bonaparte save dire situations with brilliant maneuvers. When Moreau next saw the paroled general, he severely reprimanded him but later admitted to the government that Sérurier's only mistake was hewing to his orders too rigidly. This was the last time Sérurier led troops in combat.

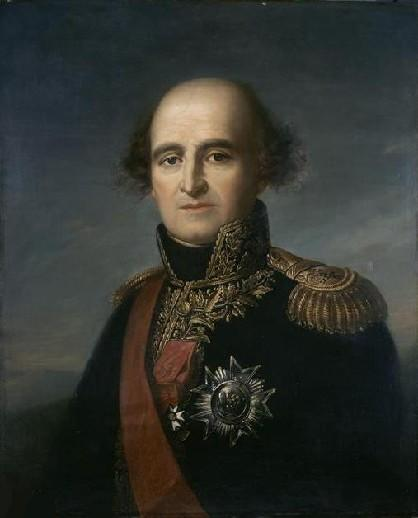
Marshal Sérurier

Meanwhile, the French Directory sank in popularity after military defeats and mismanagement. Back in Paris, Sérurier became part of the Bonaparte faction, having seen nothing but disaster since serving under the military genius. Bonaparte launched the Coup of 18 Brumaire on 9 November 1799 during which Sérurier led a reserve detachment of soldiers at the Pont-du-Jour. The next day, the coup almost collapsed when Bonaparte had to be rescued from the Council of Five Hundred. However, Lucien Bonaparte convinced the council's own guard battalion that only a minority of members opposed his brother. These soldiers soon evicted the lawmakers from their own hall. During these events, Sérurier's troops arrived at Saint-Cloud and the general was heard addressing them, "The wretches! They wished to kill General Bonaparte. Do not stir soldiers; wait until you get orders". In the aftermath of the coup, Sérurier was put on a commission to determine how to use auxiliary battalions on 15 November 1799. He became a member of the Sénat conservateur (Senate) on 27 December.

== Later life ==
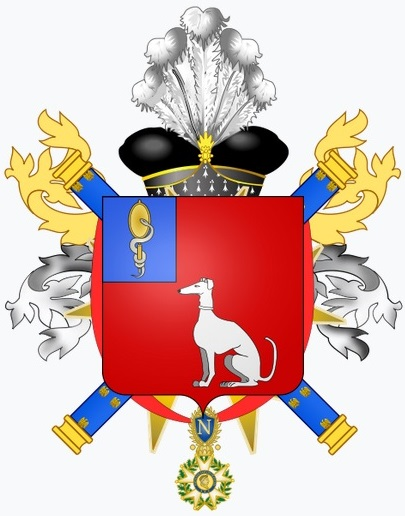
Heraldic achievement of Jean-Mathieu-Philibert Sérurier as comte de l’Empire

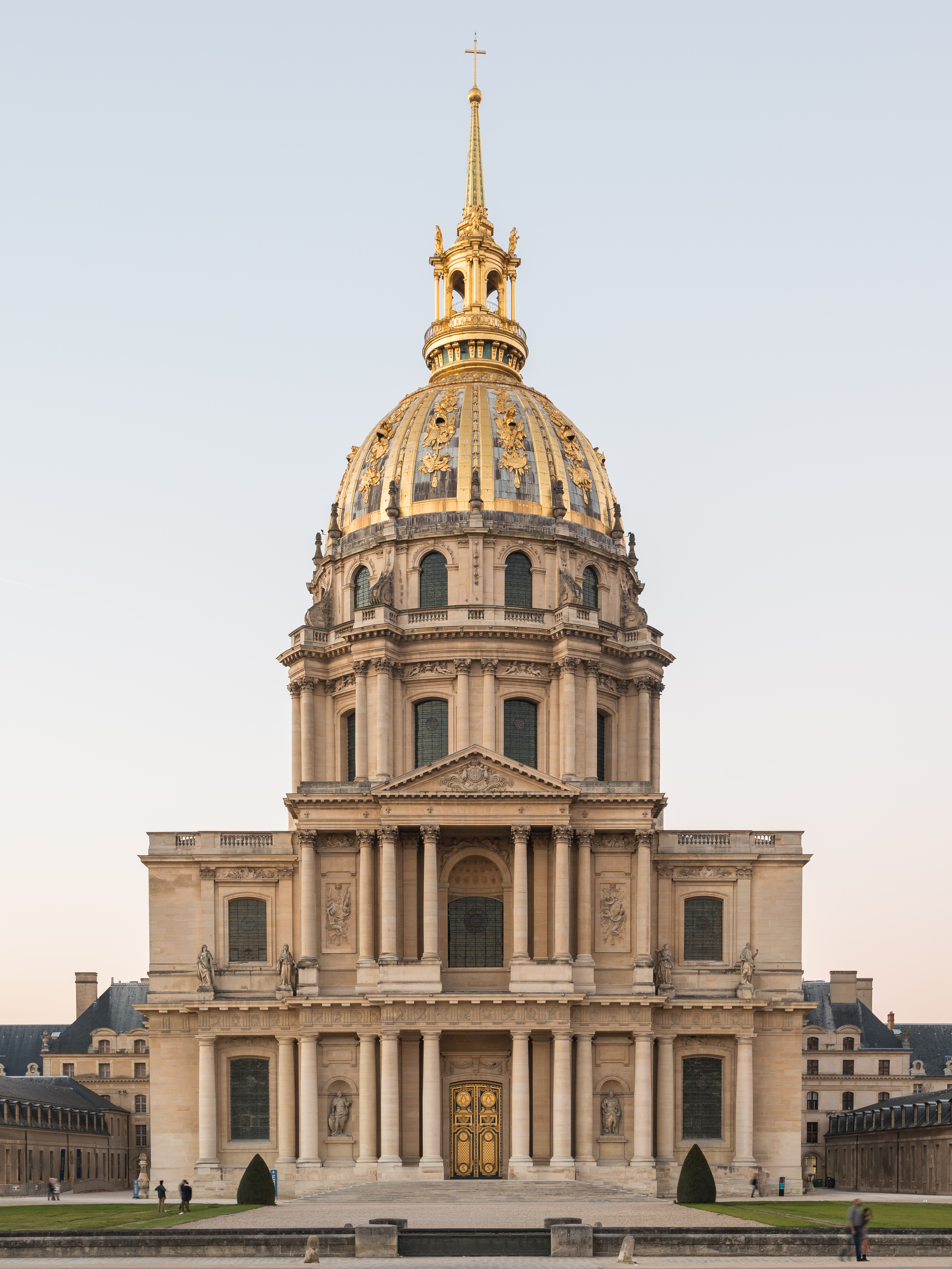
Dome of Les Invalides

In time Sérurier became vice-president of the Senate and in 1803 was appointed president of a commission that determined the border between France and Piedmont. In 1804 he was named governor of Les Invalides, a hospital and retirement home for veterans. On 19 May that year Emperor Napoleon named him an honorary Marshal of France. Out of 18 marshals appointed on this date, the other three honorary ones were François Joseph Lefebvre, François Christophe de Kellermann and Catherine-Dominique de Pérignon. Sérurier was awarded the Grand Eagle of the Légion d'Honneur and the Grand Cordon of the Order of the Iron Crown. He was ennobled as a Count of the Empire (comte de l’Empire) in 1808 and granted a pension of 40,000 francs per year.

On 31 March 1814, upon the arrival of the Sixth Coalition armies at Paris, Sérurier publicly destroyed the 1,417 captured enemy flags and personally burned the sword and sash of Frederick the Great as to not let them fall into the Allies' hands. The restored King Louis XVIII made Sérurier a Peer of France, but he joined Napoleon during the Hundred Days, when the former emperor briefly returned to power. This caused him to lose his post at Les Invalides and his marshal's salary after Napoleon's second downfall. Despite his Bonapartist sympathies, acting in his role of Peer, Sérurier voted in favour of the death penalty for Marshal Michel Ney.

Sérurier was restored to the dignity of marshal in 1819. He died on 21 December that year in Paris and was buried at Père Lachaise Cemetery. His body was not transferred to Les Invalides until 26 February 1847 SERURIER is one of the names inscribed on the Arc de Triomphe, on Column 24.
