= Battle of Saorgio =

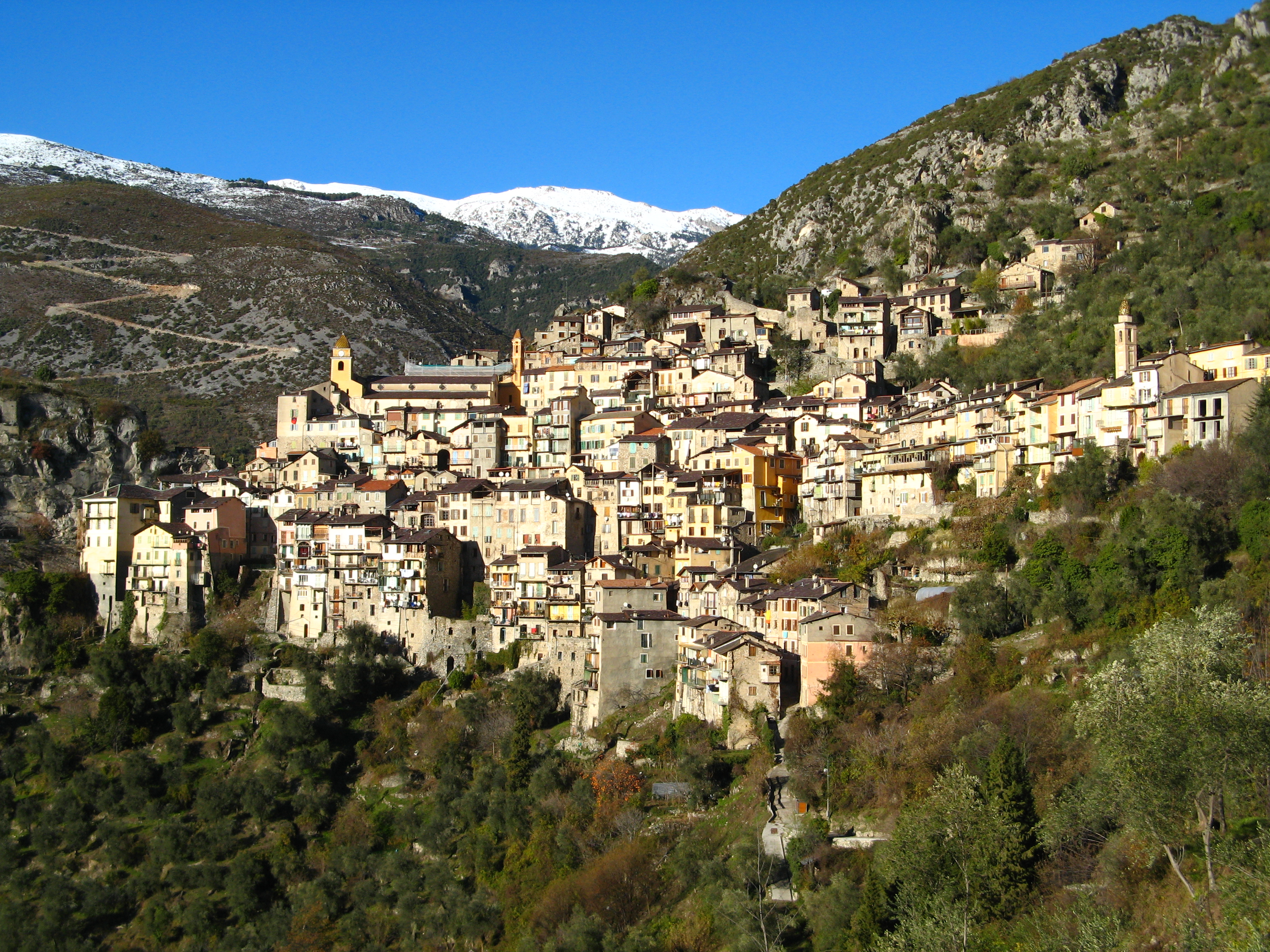
Saorge (Alpes-Maritimes): general view in winter

The Battle of Saorgio focuses on the town of Saorge, and may refer to:

- First Battle of Saorgio (1793)
- Second Battle of Saorgio (1794)
