= Second Battle of Saorgio =

1794 battle of the Alps Campaign

Battle of Saorgio
- Part of the Alps Campaign
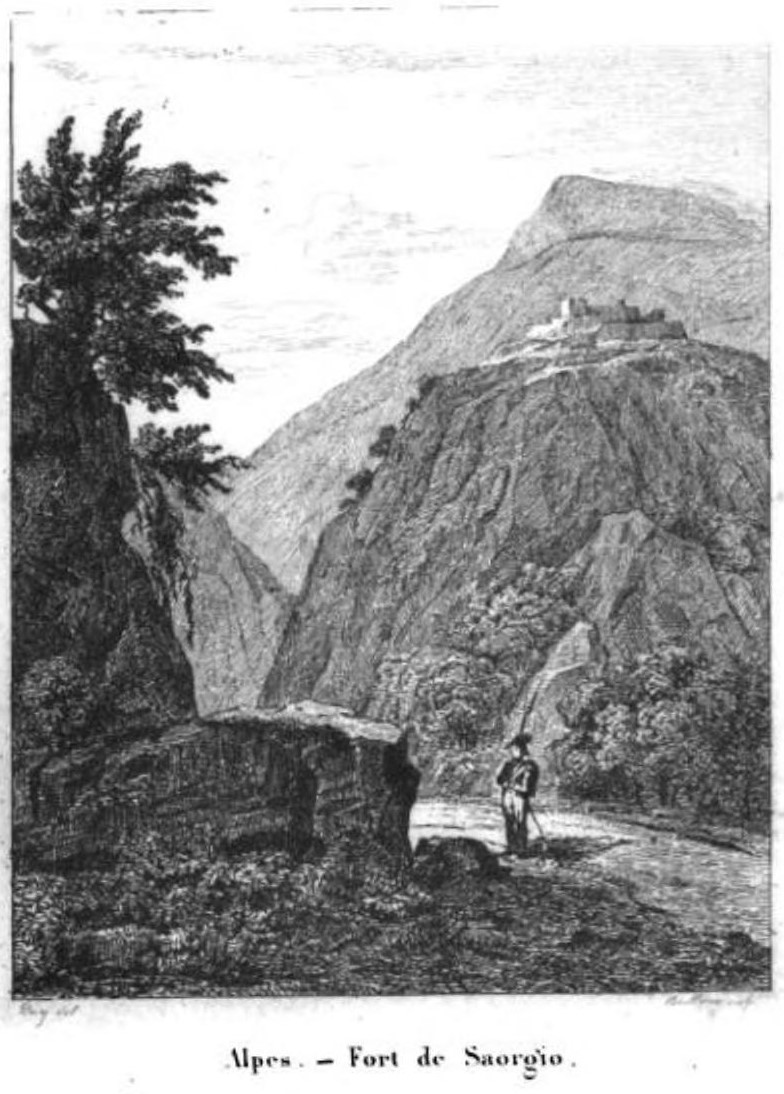
- French trooper near captured Fort Saorgio (illustration from La France Militaire, 1833)
Date	24 to 28 April 1794
Location	Saorge, County of Nice, Kingdom of Sardinia 43.9883°N 7.5531°E
Result	French victory

Belligerents
(French First Republic) France	(Habsburg monarchy) Habsburg Austria (Kingdom of Sardinia) Sardinia

Commanders and leaders
(French First Republic) Napoleon Bonaparte (French First Republic) André Masséna (French First Republic) Jean-Mathieu-Philibert Sérurier (French First Republic) Pierre Jadart Dumerbion	(Kingdom of Sardinia) Michelangelo Colli

Strength
20,000	8,000

Casualties and losses
1,500	3,000

War of the First Coalition:
Italian Campaign
current battle
Napoleon as subordinate
Napoleon in command

The Second Battle of Saorgio was fought from 24 to 28 April 1794 between a French First Republic army commanded by Pierre Jadart Dumerbion and the armies of the Kingdom of Sardinia-Piedmont and the Habsburg monarchy led by Joseph Nikolaus De Vins. It was part of a successful French offensive designed to capture strategic positions in the Maritime Alps and Ligurian Alps, and on the Mediterranean coast. Tactical control of the battle was exercised by André Masséna for the French and Michelangelo Alessandro Colli-Marchi for the Coalition. Saorge is located in France, about 70 kilometres (43 mi) northeast of Nice. At the time of the battle, the town was named Saorgio and belonged to Piedmont.

Since September 1792, the Piedmontese defenses around Saorge had resisted capture. In early April 1794, the French struck northeastward along the Italian Riviera, quickly seizing the small port of Oneglia. From there, Masséna struck north to capture two towns in the upper Tanaro valley before turning west to outflank the positions around Saorge. After some fighting, the Austro-Piedmontese withdrew to the north side of the Col de Tende (Tenda Pass) which the French occupied. Dumerbion's troops also seized a large portion of the Italian Riviera. The action occurred during the War of the First Coalition, part of the French Revolutionary Wars. The engagement is significant in military history because a newly appointed artillery general by the name of Napoleon Bonaparte drew up the plans for the offensive.

== Background ==
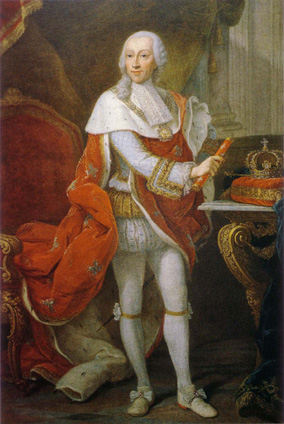
King Victor Amadeus III

The Kingdom of Sardinia-Piedmont stood at a disadvantage in a war with France because two of its territories lay on the French side of the Alps. These lands were the County of Nice on the Mediterranean coast and the Duchy of Savoy in the north. Aware of his awkward situation, King Victor Amadeus III of Sardinia attempted to secure an alliance with Habsburg Austria at the same time as he held diplomatic talks with the French. In spring 1792, war broke out between the French First Republic and Sardinia. The French government ordered General Anne-Pierre, marquis de Montesquiou-Fézensac to invade Savoy on 15 May, but that officer decided that he needed more time to prepare. During the summer, King Victor Amadeus frantically haggled with Austria to get military assistance. On 22 September, Austria finally agreed to provide an Auxiliary Corps of 8,000 troops under Feldmarschall-Leutnant Leopoldo Lorenzo, Count of Strassoldo. However, the Convention of Milan came too late.

On 21 September 1792, Montesquiou invaded Savoy and resistance collapsed. The general reported to his government that the people welcomed his army. The town of Chambéry was occupied on 24 September. Sardinian General Lazary, a 70-year-old relic, proved unable to mount an effective defense. A second French force captured Nice without bloodshed on 27 September and went on to seize Villefranche-sur-Mer two days later. At the behest of its leaders, Savoy was incorporated into France on 27 November. On 23 September, a French naval squadron under Rear Admiral Laurent Jean François Truguet sailed to the Piedmontese port of Oneglia where an 800-man battalion disembarked. The troops sacked the town and murdered some monks before taking to their ships again. On 18 November 1792, the Sardinians repulsed their adversaries at Sospel (Sospello). The French retreated to L'Escarène and went into winter quarters.

Dismayed by the incapacity of his generals, King Victor Amadeus III of Sardinia begged the Austrians to send a commander to direct the combined Austrian and Piedmontese armies. The Austrian government appointed Feldzeugmeister Joseph Nikolaus De Vins to fill the post on 21 December 1792. Even so, Austria was aware that the French were trying to negotiate a peace with the Sardinians, and the Austrians did not fully trust their ally. The execution of Louis XVI on 21 January 1793 appalled the other crowned heads of Europe and further isolated France.

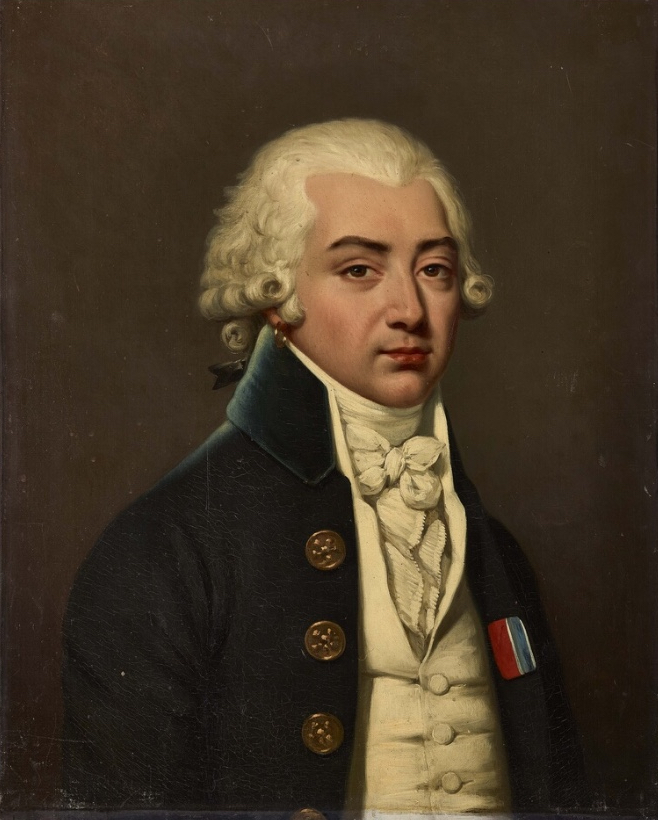
Duke of Biron

On 28 February 1793, 12,000 French troops under Lieutenant General Armand Louis de Gontaut, Duke of Biron battled with 7,000 Sardinian soldiers under Lieutenant General Charles-François Thaon, Count of Saint-André at Levens. In this French success, each side lost 800 casualties. In addition, the French captured 2 of their foe's 6 cannons. The Sardinian army held a powerful defensive position at Saorge (Saorgio), blocking access to the strategically important Col de Tende (Tenda Pass). On 8 June 1793, the Army of Italy under General of Division Gaspard Jean-Baptiste Brunet won a minor victory over the Sardinians in the area of L'Aution Peak west of Saorge. The forces clashed again in the First Battle of Saorgio on 12 June. This time the French were defeated. The Sardinian units involved in these fights were two battalions each of the Cacciatori and Swiss Christ Infantry Regiments, one battalion each of the Saluzzo, Sardinia, and Lombardy Infantry Regiments. Also engaged were two companies of French Royalist volunteers, the Cacciatori de Canale, Light Infantry, 1st, 3rd, and 5th Grenadier Battalions, and the Vercelli, Casale, and Acqui Provincial Regiments. The attack was "ill-conceived" and ended in "disaster".

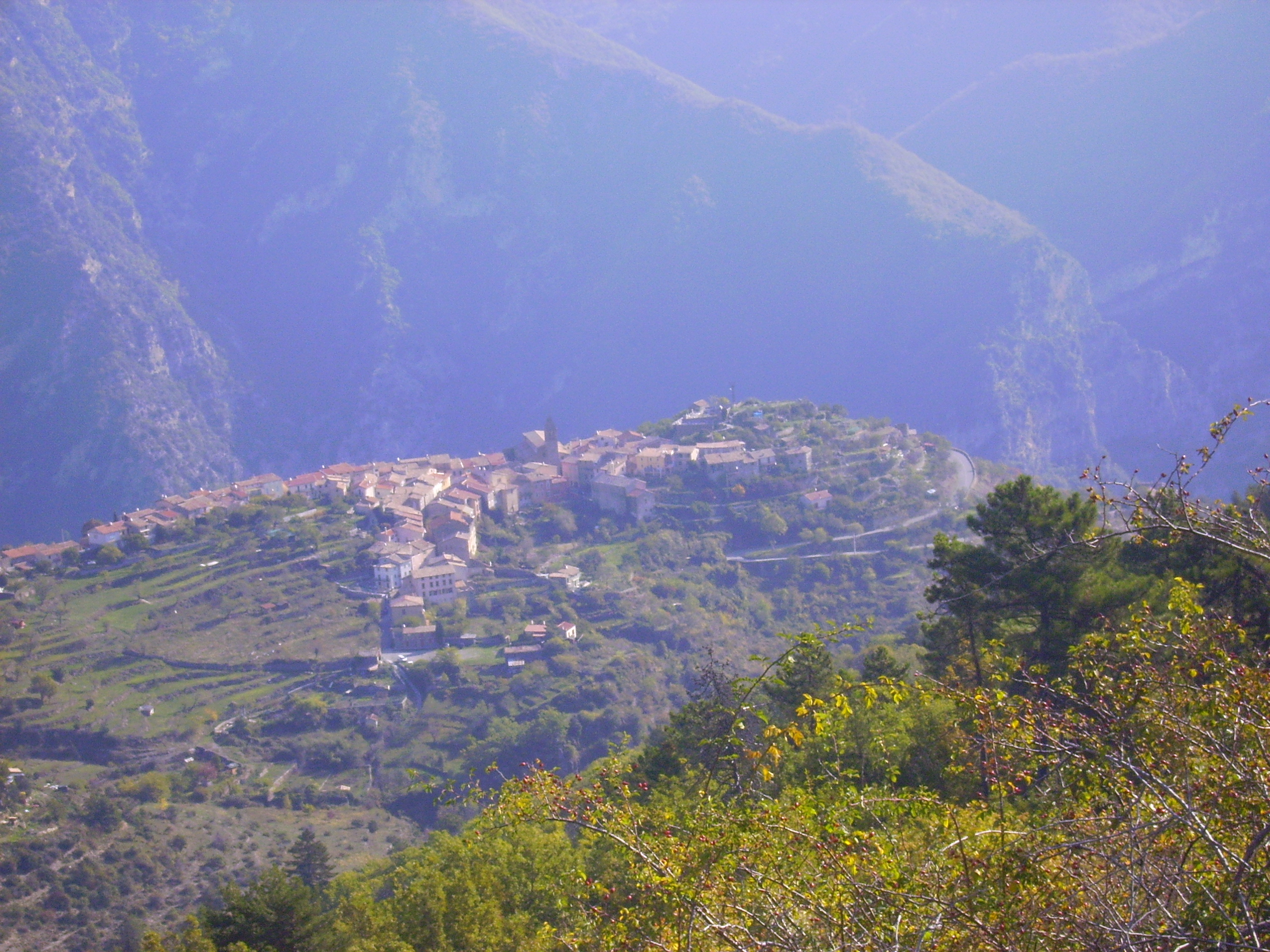
Fighting occurred at Utelle on 21 October 1793.

The allies tried to mount a counteroffensive, but this effort was crippled by the new commander's slowness. De Vins planned to recapture both Savoy and Nice, which a number of officers objected to. Because he suffered badly from gout, De Vins planned to control both offensives from the capital of Turin. Prince Maurizio, Duke of Montferrat, who led the counter-invasion of Savoy, was to follow strict daily orders from De Vins. Since Turin was 45 miles (72 km) distant, the arrangements were impractical. In the event, a French force under General of Division François Christophe de Kellermann repulsed Lieutenant General Cordon's Savoy column at the Battle of Epierre on 15 September 1793. The French suffered 500 casualties out of 8,000 troops, while the Sardinians lost 1,000 men out of 6,000 engaged. Kellermann's forces drove Montferrat's soldiers up the Little St Bernard Pass on 3 October and Cordon's troops up the Mont Cenis pass on 8 October, erasing all the Sardinians' gains.

The Count of Saint-André was directed to advance on Nice from Saorgio. This effort was made difficult by tension between Saint-André and his Austrian subordinate Feldmarschall-Leutnant Michelangelo Alessandro Colli-Marchi. Meanwhile, De Vins' chief of staff, Generalmajor Eugène-Guillaume Argenteau managed to get himself on bad terms with most of the Piedmontese officer corps. At this time, portions of southern France rebelled against the revolutionary government. Large French republican forces had to be sent to suppress the revolt at the Siege of Toulon, giving Piedmont a chance to recover its lost territory. King Victor Amadeus and De Vins left the capital in August to oversee the southern front where they planned to start operations on 7 September. On 18 October 1793, six Piedmontese battalions of the Aosta, Guardia, and Piedmont Infantry Regiments defeated the French at Gilette. Three days later there was an inconclusive skirmish at Utelle involving the 5th Grenadiers. The offensive ended when heavy snow fell in the mountains, forcing the king to give up the campaign and return to his capital in November.

== Battle ==
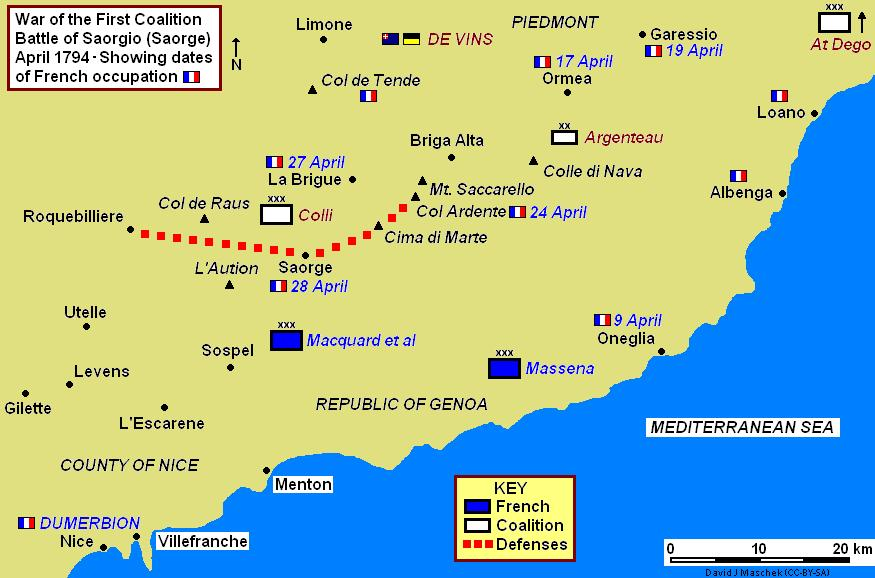
This map shows the Battle of Saorgio campaign in April 1794. The progress of the French offensive is displayed with flags and dates where known. While Dumerbion's main army probed at the Coalition lines, Masséna's wing launched a wide right hook that outflanked the enemy defenses.

At the start of 1794, the Piedmontese occupied a formidable defensive position that ran from Roquebillière on the west through the Col de Raus, L'Aution Peak, and Colle Basse to Saorge. From Saorge, the line ran northeast to Cima di Marte, Col Ardente, and Monte Saccarello. The line was so strong that an outflanking move to the east seemed the obvious move. Sardinian General Dellera feared that the French might seize the Colle di Nava northwest of Oneglia. He wanted to occupy Briga Alta northeast of Saorgio but De Vins refused to authorize it. However, Dellera convinced the army commander to move an Austrian force from the Po River valley to Dego. In addition, De Vins ordered 4,000 Sardinian troops to protect the area around Oneglia.

French General of Division Pierre Jadart Dumerbion commanded the Army of Italy. Competent but old, he had seen too many generals sent to the guillotine for failing or for having the wrong political views. Two of his predecessors suffered this fate, Brunet on 15 November 1793 and Biron on 31 December 1793. In order to stay out of trouble, Dumerbion determined to consult the all-powerful Representatives on mission before acting. At this time, the representatives were Augustin Robespierre and Antoine Christophe Saliceti and both were influenced by freshly promoted General of Brigade Napoleon Bonaparte, the army's new artillery chief. Bonaparte drew up a strategic plan and Dumerbion listened. Bonaparte, basing his strategy on the work of Pierre-Joseph Bourcet, planned to launch a drive northeast along the coast to capture Oneglia, a nest of Sardinian privateers that preyed on the Genoa-to-Nice grain trade. From Oneglia, the French would turn north to seize Ormea, outflanking the enemy's defenses from the east. While these moves were implemented, the main army would distract the Coalition defenders by advancing directly on Saorge. Of Dumerbion's 43,000-man field army, 20,000 men formed the attacking force, divided into three columns and a reserve.

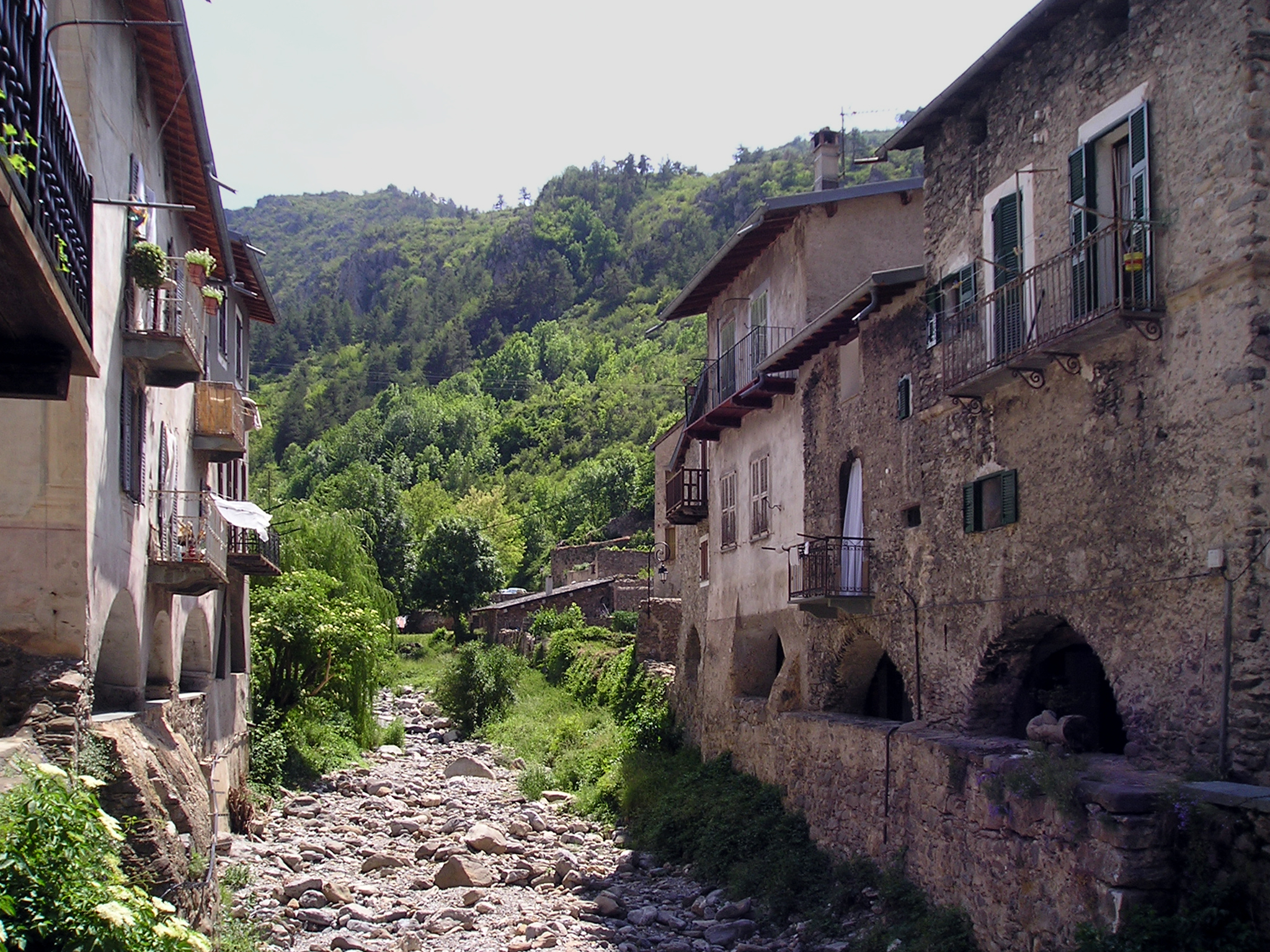
Town of La Brigue

On 6 April 1794, Dumerbion opened the offensive. Crossing neutral territory belonging to the Republic of Genoa, the French seized the port of Oneglia on the 9th. Argenteau, who commanded the local Piedmontese division, occupied Ormea and strung out his 10 battalions in an attempt to link the Saorge defenses in the west with Dego in the east. The French advance, led by General of Division André Masséna, brushed aside Argenteau's men and captured Ormea around 17 April and Garessio on the 19th. Seeing that Massena was preparing to storm his outpost, the old Sardinian officer defending Ormea saw that his task was hopeless. He insisted, "Draw back and let me fire 5 or 6 gun-shots in the air, and we will then write that I surrendered after an honorable defense." Massena denied his request, replying that he had no time for such out-of-date formalities. Colli, the newly appointed commander at Saorge, now found that his position was outflanked. De Vins advised Colli to hold the position but to send back any forces not needed for immediate defense. Relations between the allies were so bad at this time that some Piedmontese officers believed that De Vins was plotting to betray them. On the French side, Auguste Marmont claimed that the ailing Dumerbion stayed in Nice during the entire operation.

On 24 April there was a clash at Saorge, as the French main army advanced north. Colli's defenders included three battalions of the Alvinczi Infantry Regiment Nr. 19, the 3rd Battalion of the Strassoldo Infantry Regiment Nr. 27, the 1st and 2nd Battalions of the Archduke Anton Infantry Regiment Nr. 52, and the 2nd and 9th Battalions of the Karlstadt Grenz infantry regiment. On the same day, Masséna successfully attacked the Col Ardente with General of Brigade Amédée Emmanuel François Laharpe's division. On 27 April, the French seized La Brigue, inflicting heavy losses on their Sardinian opponents. These included the Cacciatori, Guardia, and Tortona Infantry Regiments, the 1st Grenadier Battalion, two companies of French volunteers, and the Cacciatori di Pandini company. On French far left flank, General of Division Pierre Dominique Garnier advanced up the Vésubie valley past Lantosque, while his left brigade under General of Brigade Jean-Mathieu-Philibert Sérurier occupied Isola and linked with the right wing of the Army of the Alps.

== Results ==
The French seized Saorgio on 28 April after Colli withdrew. He abandoned the Col de Tende and retreated to Limone Piemonte, just north of the pass. In early May, Colli fell back to Borgo San Dalmazzo near the fortress of Cuneo. On the coast, the French advanced to seize Albenga and Loano. General of Division François Macquard occupied the Col de Tende, while farther east Masséna deployed his troops to hold the ridges between Ormea and Loano. In the fighting near Saorge, historian Digby Smith stated French losses as 1,500 killed and wounded, while the allied casualties numbered 2,800. Losses for the other battles were not given.

Bonaparte and the representatives on mission proposed a new operation to exploit the victory, but it was vetoed by Lazare Carnot. The defeat shocked the Austrians and Sardinians into signing a treaty on 29 May. The Sardinians promised to hold the Alpine passes while the Austrians pledged to defend the coast. The next action in the area was the First Battle of Dego on 21 September 1794.
