= First Battle of Saorgio =

1793 battle of the Alps Campaign

Coordinates: 43.9883°N 7.5531°E

- Part of the Alps Campaign
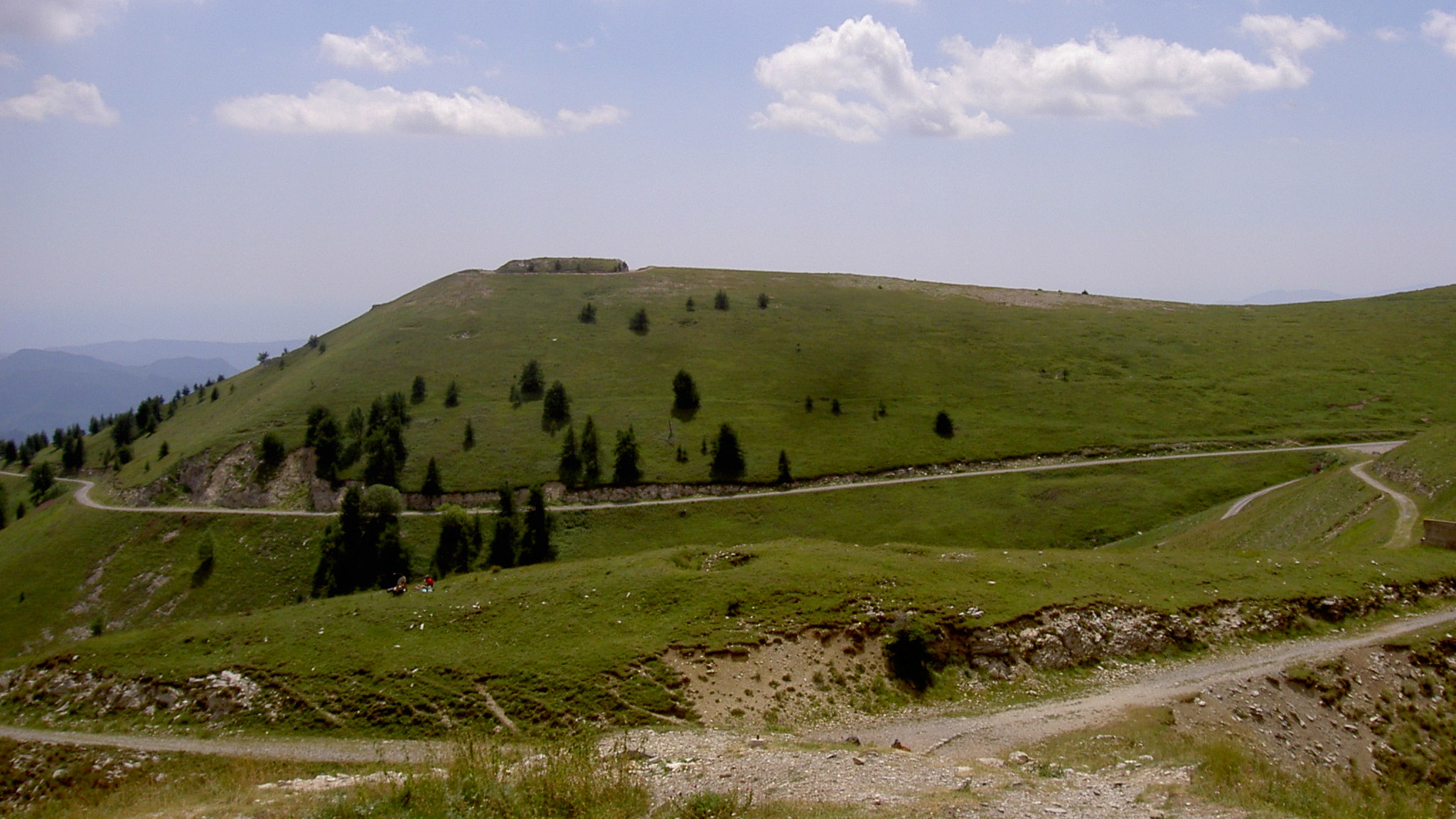
- Fort de La Forca on the Massif de l’Authion
| Date | 8–12 June 1793 |
| Location | Saorge, Alpes-Maritimes, France |
| Result | Austro-Sardinian victory |

Belligerents
| (Habsburg monarchy) Austria (Kingdom of Sardinia) Sardinia | (French First Republic) France |

Commanders and leaders
| (Habsburg monarchy) Joseph De Vins (Kingdom of Sardinia) Count of Saint-André | (French First Republic) Gaspard Brunet |

Strength
| 10,000–12,000 | 17,000 |

Casualties and losses
| Unknown | 1,532 |

The First Battle of Saorgio (8–12 June 1793) saw a French army commanded by Gaspard Jean-Baptiste Brunet attack the armies of the Sardinia-Piedmont and Austria led by Joseph Nikolaus De Vins. The local Sardinian commander in the Maritime Alps was Charles-François Thaon, Count of Saint-André. Though the French were initially successful in this War of the First Coalition action, their main assaults against the strong defensive positions on the Massif de l'Authion and the Col de Raus failed with serious losses. Saorge is now located in France about 70 kilometres (43 mi) northeast of Nice, but in 1793 Saorgio belonged to Piedmont. In April 1794 the French seized the positions from the Austro-Sardinians in the Second Battle of Saorgio.

== Background ==
=== Operations ===
The winter of 1792 found two French armies facing the Kingdom of Sardinia. On the north was the Army of the Alps under François Christophe Kellermann occupying Savoy. On the south lay the Army of Italy under Jacques Bernard d'Anselme at Nice with a paper strength of 26,806 men but only 21,728 available for field work. Anselme wanted to mount a naval expedition to Rome but the French government desired to attack the island of Sardinia instead. The government ordered Anselme suspended on 16 December 1792 and his temporary replacement was Gaspard Jean-Baptiste Brunet. Anselme was arrested on 12 April 1793 but managed to survive the Reign of Terror. Meanwhile, Brunet led the expedition to Sardinia which began on 8 January and ended in complete failure within two months. Armand Louis de Gontaut, Duke of Biron assumed command of the Army of Italy on 10 February and pushed eastward with his right flank on the Mediterranean Sea.

Dismayed by the incapacity shown by his general officers in 1792, King Victor Amadeus III begged Austria to send his army a supreme commander and his ally sent Joseph Nikolaus De Vins on 21 December. Despite this, the Austrian government suspected Victor Amadeus of desiring a separate peace with France. In fact, the French tried to diplomatically drive a wedge between Sardinia and Austria, but the execution of King Louis XVI by guillotine on 21 January 1793 caused Victor Amadeus to rebuff France. In the spring, the defenses of Sardinia were organized from north to south as follows. The Duke of Montferrat held the Little St Bernard Pass which protected the Aosta Valley. The Marquis of Cordon (or Gordon) covered the Susa Valley with 14 battalions. His headquarters were at Susa and a 16-gun fort overlooked the Mont Cenis Pass. Giovanni Marchese di Provera guarded the Agnel Pass near Monte Viso. Leopold Lorenz Bartholomaus von Strassoldo shielded the Stura di Demonte Valley with 12 battalions posted near Demonte. Farthest south, Charles-François Thaon, Count of Saint-André employed 10,000 to 12,000 soldiers to defend Saorgio and pose a threat to Nice.

=== Combat at Levens ===
On 28 February 1793 there was a clash at Levens in which Biron's 12,000 Frenchmen defeated 7,000 Sardinians under the Count of Saint-André. Both sides suffered 800 casualties while the Sardinians also lost two of their six artillery pieces. At this period, the Sardinians were more familiar with mountain warfare while the French columns, moving separately, often lost themselves in the forests, rough terrain and foggy valleys. Biron's offensive was helped when the Army of the Alps took responsibility over the Barcelonette valley and the County of Beuil. Moving east, the French overran the lower Var and Vésubie valleys and occupied Sospel. In March the Army of Italy counted 17,000 troops present for duty in 25 infantry battalions and two cavalry squadrons. Already a rising star, André Masséna had charge of five battalions. In its strange policy of moving commanders around before they could master their armies, the French government transferred Biron to lead the Army of the Coasts of La Rochelle on 4 May 1793. Though the duke was loyal to the French Revolution, the Jacobins planned to bring him down because he was a prominent aristocrat. They finally succeeded and Biron went to the guillotine on 31 December 1793.

The end of March 1793 saw Saint-André's forces organized into a Left Division under Pernigotti headquartered at Breil-sur-Roya with 7,050 soldiers in 15 battalions and a Right Division under Dellera based at Fontan with 5,200 troops in 11 battalions. The Sardinian infantry regiments normally had two battalions, numbering about 500 men each. Grenadier and Light Infantry Battalions counted about 400 men and the Light Legion had 300 soldiers. The Austrians contributed Infantry Regiment Belgiojoso Nr. 44 with one battalion of 600 men and a Garrison battalion of 400 men. In May, 1,000 men of the Casale Regiment arrived as a reinforcement.

== Battle ==
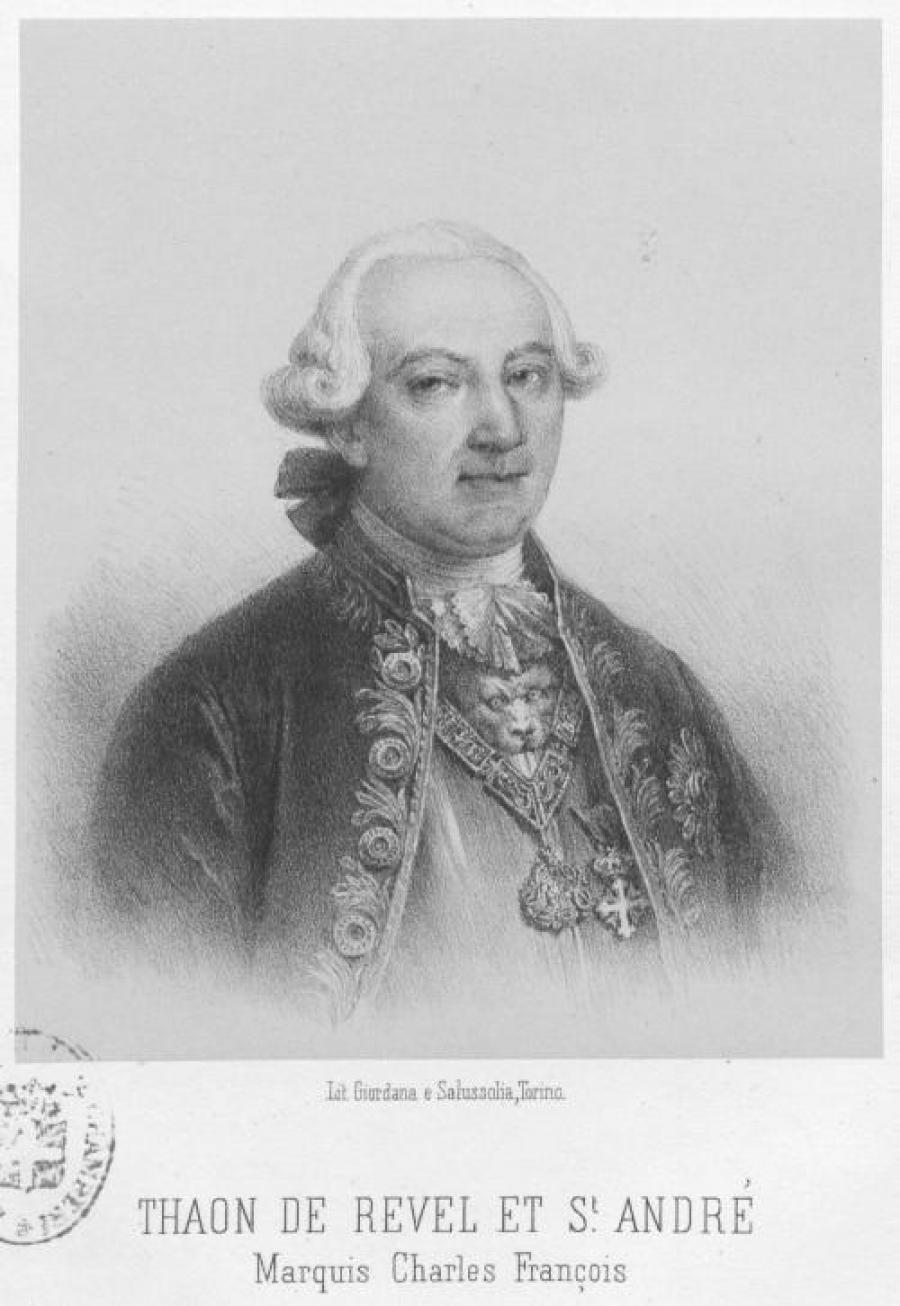
Count of Saint-André

Biron's replacement was Brunet who was in favor with the representatives on mission who brought about Anselme's dismissal. In May and June, the Army of Italy began closing on Saint-André's main defenses. On 19 May, Brunet sent Jean-Mathieu-Philibert Sérurier with a left flank column to Saint-Sauveur-sur-Tinée where he made a rendezvous with some Army of the Alps troops. From there, the 3,000-strong force advanced up the Tinée River to seize Isola on 21 May. The Sardinians abandoned the upper Tinée valley; Sérurier left it in possession of the sister army and returned to the Army of Italy.

The main Sardinian defenses covered the town of Saorgio, situated on the east bank above the gorge of the Roya River. From Saorgio, a line of fortifications ran west, starting at the Saint-Martha entrenched camp on the west side of the Roya. Going west along the crest, the key points were the Colle Basse, Massif de l'Authion and Col de Raus. The village of Roquebillière marked the western end of the line. In the other direction from Saorgio, the mountain ridge trended to the northeast via the Cima di Marte, Colle Ardente and Monte Saccarello. Dellera and Michelangelo Alessandro Colli-Marchi led the two defending brigades. The Austro-Sardinians suffered from command problems. Like De Vins, Colli was an Austrian general lent to Sardinia. Colli and his superior Saint-André did not get along. The situation was made worse by instructions from De Vins for Colli to obey an order from Saint-André only if the Austrian generalissimo concurred. The Sardinian officer corps also disliked De Vins' chief of staff, another Austrian named Eugène-Guillaume Argenteau.

The French representatives on mission repeatedly insisted on frontal attacks and threatened to denounce any general who showed reluctance to carry out their demands. Brunet began his offensive on 8 June with a success in which Masséna participated. Jean Quirin Mieskowski's brigade captured the entrenched camp of Linieras and seized Mangiabo. On the same day, Sérurier and 3,000 troops were repulsed in an attack on the Col de Raus, 5 kilometres (3.1 mi) northwest of Authion. On 12 June Brunet tried again with a direct assault on the artillery battery that crowned Authion. Sérurier led one of the attacking columns which were composed mostly of the army's grenadiers. Despite three brave charges, the French finally recoiled after an Austrian counterattack. While the French supporting fire was weak, the Sardinian batteries were well-sited to take any attackers in flank. As the French first line fell back, the raw troops making up the reserves screamed, "Treason!" and ran away. Seeing this, Brunet decided nothing more could be done and retreated. The French suffered losses of 280 dead and 1,252 wounded. Austro-Sardinian losses are not stated.

== Forces ==
=== Austro-Sardinian order of battle ===
Historians Ramsay Weston Phipps and Edward Cust both assert that Saint-André led the allies at Saorgio. However, an order of battle exists for the Austro-Sardinian army on 8 June 1793 that placed the Duke of Chablais in command over the Left Division of Saint-André and the Right Division of Colli. The Left Division had two battalions of Infantry Regiment Nice, one battalion of Queen's and 8th Grenadier Battalion in Camp Brouis, two battalions of Saluzzo in Camp Perus, two battalions of Tortona in Saorge, two battalions of Vercelli in Camp Linieras, one battalion of Sardinia in Camp Albarea, 1st Light Battalion in Camp Beolet, one battalion of Queen's in Camp Briel and 4th Grenadier Battalion in Camp Corgoule. The Austrian Garrison battalion was split between Camps Brouis and Perus.

The Right Division deployed two battalions each of Infantry Regiments Casale and Lombardy, one battalion of Christ and 1st Grenadier Battalion at Camp Authion, two battalions of Acqui at Camp Raus, two battalions of Oneglia at Oneglia to the east, 9th Grenadier Battalion at Camp Fromagnie, one battalion of Austrian Belgiojoso Nr. 44 en route to the Col de Tende, Light Legion at Saint-Véran and Ortighea and French Royalists at Moulinet. Infantry Regiment Christ was a Swiss unit in Sardinian pay and Sardinian light units were denoted Cacciatore.

=== French order of battle ===
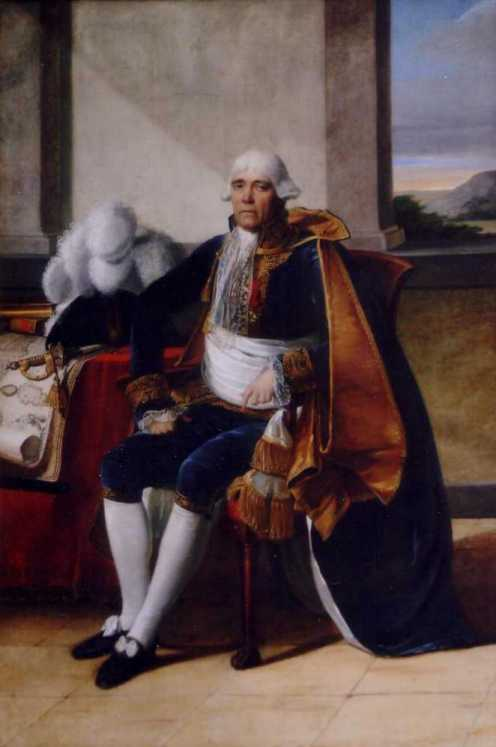
Raphaël de Casabianca

On 7 June 1793 Kellermann exercised authority over both his own army and the Army of Italy under Brunet. Jean François Cornu de Lapoype was Brunet's chief of staff while Jean du Teil commanded the army's artillery. Dominique Sheldon was the only general of division, while Raphaël, Comte de Casabianca, Pierre Jadart Dumerbion, Joseph Louis Montredon, Antoine Saint-Hillier and Jacques Louis Saint-Martin were generals of brigade. Dumerbion later became army commander, but in 1796 Napoleon Bonaparte wrote that Casabianca was "not fit to command a battalion". The French army consisted of both regular and volunteer battalions. Grenadier and chasseur companies were detached from their battalions to form elite units.

Places on the French Riviera were garrisoned with 9,000 troops. There were 597 troops at Antibes, 1,076 at Monaco, 2,471 at Nice, 168 at Saint-Laurent-du-Var, 1,021 at Toulon and 626 at Villefranche-sur-Mer. Additionally, there were 1,053 volunteers in two battalions at Camp Diegue and 1,988 in the two-battalion 11th Line Infantry Regiment and two volunteer battalions at Castillon near Sospel.

In the Roya Valley to the right flank were 7,052 troops. There were 426 grenadiers in seven companies and 87 gunners in two artillery companies at L'Escarène and 298 grenadiers in five companies and 649 chasseurs in 12 companies at Sospel. The bulk of the strength lay at the Camp de Braos with two battalions each of the 28th, 51st and 91st Line Infantry or 3,384 regulars, 196 grenadiers in three companies, 1,761 men in four volunteer battalions and 251 gunners in five companies.

In the Tinée and Vésubie valleys on the left flank were 6,057 troops. There were 285 men at Saint-Sauveur, 190 at Utelle, 1,027 in one volunteer battalion and three companies at La Bollène-Vésubie, 1,621 in three battalions, nine grenadier and two artillery companies at Lantosque and 557 volunteers in one battalion at Roquebillière. At Belvédère were two battalions each of the 42nd and 50th Line Infantry or 1,890 regulars and 487 men in six infantry and two artillery companies.

An additional body of 3,618 troops was posted in the center. There were 2,438 soldiers in one regular and three volunteer battalions and one artillery company at Saint-Arnould, 730 in five light infantry and seven grenadier companies at Col Negre and 450 in one volunteer battalion at Lucéram.

== Aftermath ==
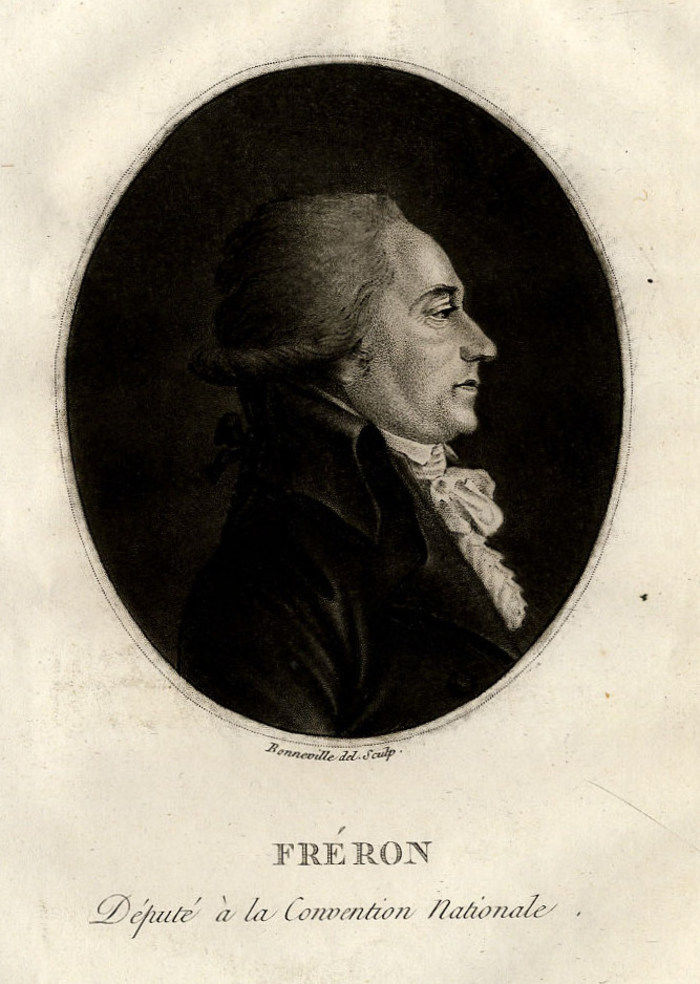
Louis Fréron

Hectored by the political representatives, Brunet launched a new assault on the Massif de l'Authion and Col de Raus at the end of July. This effort failed though the connection with the Army of the Alps improved. Brunet announced that he would turn the left flank of the Saorgio position by marching across Republic of Genoa territory. Nothing came of this plan. Representative Paul Barras did not care for the generals, but Sérurier's actions had pleased him so he nominated him for promotion on 25 June. Both Masséna and Sérurier were appointed generals of brigade on 22 August 1793.

Brunet did not get along with his chief of staff, who was a radical Jacobin, so he assigned Lapoype to guard the coast. Lapoype complained to his brother-in-law, the representative Louis-Marie Stanislas Fréron. Soon Brunet became embroiled in a dispute with the politically powerful Fréron and Barras. Later, Brunet correctly predicted that Toulon might admit Coalition forces if the political representatives resorted to harsh measures. In the meantime, he refused to send troops to bully the city into submission. For this, Fréron and Barras removed him from command on 8 August and replaced him with Dumerbion. When Toulon let in the Allied fleet on 27 August, Brunet was denounced as a traitor. He was imprisoned in Paris on 6 September, put on trial on 14 November and guillotined the next day.

The following year, Bonaparte, the new artillery commander of the Army of Italy submitted a plan to strike eastward across neutral Genoese territory to capture Oneglia and turn the Saorgio position from the east. The plan was accepted on 2 April 1794 and Dumerbion's offensive began four days later. In the Second Battle of Saorgio, the French captured Oneglia on 9 April, Ormea the 17th and Garessio on the 19th. Turning back to the west, they attacked Saorgio from the northeast on 27 April. Hopelessly outflanked, the Sardinians under Colli retreated and the French occupied Saorgio on the 28th.
