= Saorge =

Commune in Provence-Alpes-Côte d'Azur, France

- Commune
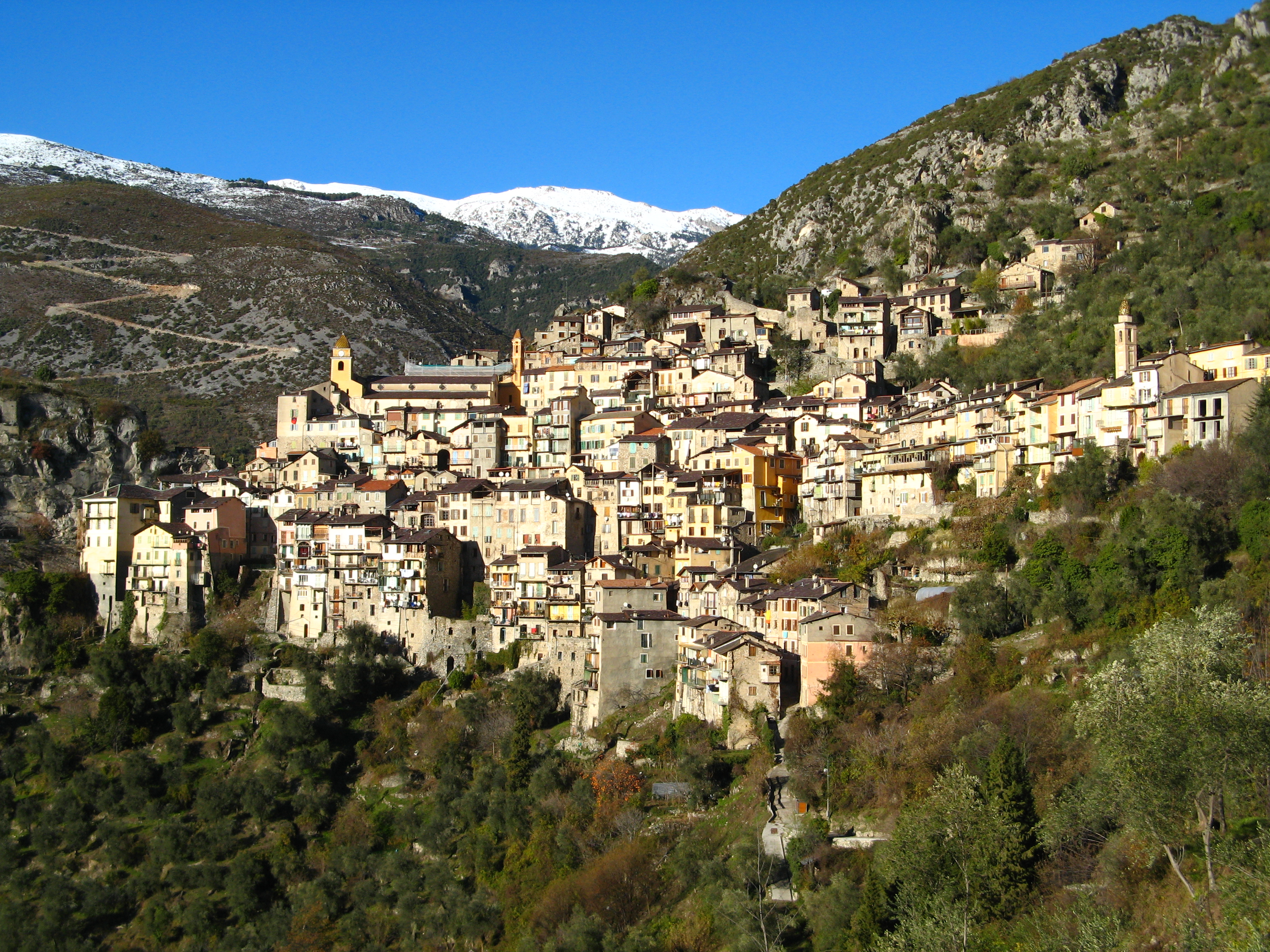
- A general view of the village

- Coat of arms
- Location of Saorge
- Location within France Location within Provence-Alpes-Côte d'Azur
- Coordinates: 43°59′18″N 7°33′11″E
- Country: France
- Region: Provence-Alpes-Côte d'Azur
- Department: Alpes-Maritimes
- Arrondissement: Nice
- Canton: Contes
- Intercommunality: CA Riviera Française

Government
  - Mayor (2026–32): David Brouste
- Area^{1}: 86.78 km^{2} (33.51 sq mi)
- Elevation: 500 m (1,600 ft)
- Highest elevation: 2,680 m (8,790 ft)
- Lowest elevation: 319 m (1,047 ft)
- Population (2023): 430
  - Density: 5.0/km^{2} (13/sq mi)
- Time zone: UTC+01:00 (CET)
  - Summer (DST): UTC+02:00 (CEST)
- INSEE/Postal code: 06132 /06540
- ^{1} French Land Register data, which excludes lakes, ponds, glaciers > 1 km^{2} (0.386 sq mi or 247 acres) and river estuaries.

Saorge (French: [saɔʁʒ]; Royasc: Sauèrge; Brigasc: Savurgë; standard Ligurian: Savurgiu; Italian: Saorgio; Occitan: Saorj) is a commune in the Alpes-Maritimes department in southeastern France. It is a member of Les Plus Beaux Villages de France (The Most Beautiful Villages of France) Association. Highway E74 which runs north from Menton, passes through Saorge on its way to the Col de Tende (Italian: Colle di Tenda) where it crosses into Italy.

The region belonged to the old County of Nice. Beginning in 1388 Saorge was part of Sardinia-Piedmont. In June 1793, Sardinia defeated the armies of the First French Republic in the First Battle of Saorgio. In the Second Battle of Saorgio in April 1794 the French wrested the town from the Piedmontese. The town was returned to Sardinia-Piedmont after the overthrow of Napoleon Bonaparte and finally ceded to France in 1860.

The local spoken regiolect is a form of the Royasc dialect.

== From the French Revolution to the First Empire ==
In 1792 the announcement of the presence of French revolutionary troops at Saint-Laurent-du-Var caused a panic in Nice. The administration of the County of Nice along with several branches of the government fled from Nice to take shelter in Saorge on 18 September. At the same time, the Sardinian troops departed Nice without fighting the French. Militia from Saorge and Fontan were recruited to fight the invading French troops. To access Saorge from the valley of the Vésubie Ruas, one must cross the pass at the Massif de l'Authion and travel down the valley of Cayros (or Cairos). Two representatives on mission asked the General Gaspard Jean-Baptiste Brunet to launch an attack against the Austro-Sardinian troops commanded by General Charles-François Thaon, Count of Saint-André in June and July 1793. The French troops were inexperienced and suffered the loss of 3,200 men. Brunet was later sentenced to death and executed.

== Transportation ==
The Nice to Cuneo rail line of the SNCF passes through Saorge as does the D62044(France)/S520 (Italy) scenic highway from Ventimiglia.

== Population ==
Historical population
Year	Pop.	±% p.a.
1968	508	—
1975	330	−5.98%
1982	322	−0.35%
1990	362	+1.47%
1999	396	+1.00%
2007	435	+1.18%
2012	444	+0.41%
2017	459	+0.67%
2023	430	−1.08%
Source: INSEE

== See also ==
- Communes of the Alpes-Maritimes department
