= Charles-François Thaon, Count of Saint-André =

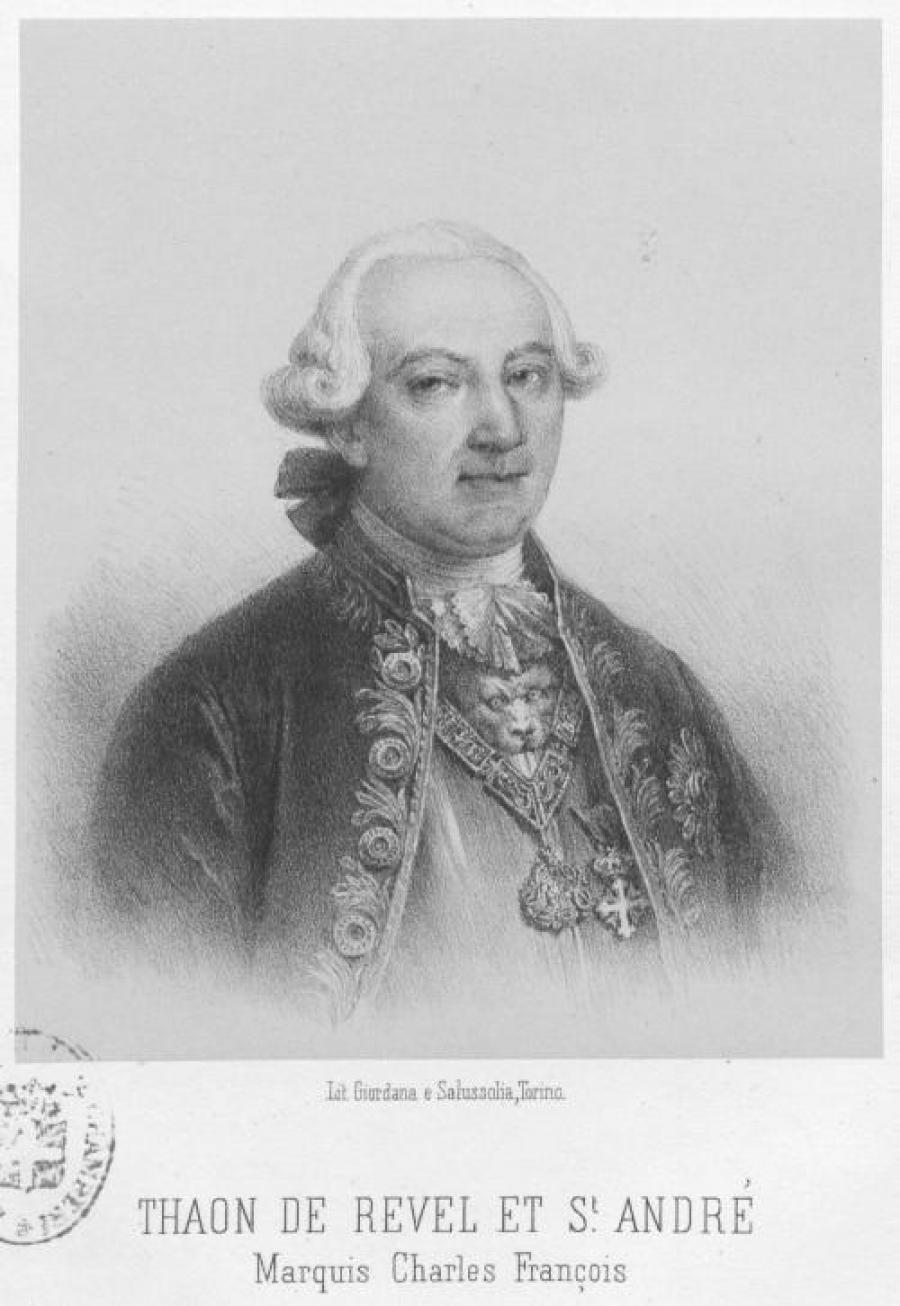
- Charles-François Thaon, Count of Saint-André
- Born: 28 February 1725; Nice, Kingdom of Sardinia
- Died: 14 December 1807 (aged 82); Cagliari, Kingdom of Sardinia
- Military career
- Allegiance: Kingdom of Sardinia
- Branch: Army
- Service years: 1740–1807
- Rank: Lieutenant-General
- Conflicts: War of the Austrian Succession; War of the First Coalition; Battle of Levens; Battle of Saorgio; War of the Second Coalition

Lieutenant-General Charles-François Thaon, Count of Saint-André (28 February 1725 – 14 December 1807) was a Royal Sardinian Army officer who served in the French Revolutionary Wars.

== Biography ==
As a young man, he fought for the Duchy of Savoy in the War of the Austrian Succession (1740-48). During the following years of peace, he gained promotion until he was made major general in 1780. He was Viceroy of Sardinia between 1787 and 1790.
He was forced to abandon Nice to the invading Republican French army in 1792. The following year he defeated the French at Saorgio. Governor of Turin (1797-1798), he was held hostage by the French when they occupied Turin on 6 December 1798.
Freed by the peasants of the Susa Valley, he was able to join Alexander Suvorov, take command of the remnants of the Sardinian army, with which he played a minor part in 1799 during the War of the Second Coalition. On behalf of King Charles Emmanuel IV, who had fled to Sardinia, he assumed the general lieutenancy of the mainland states with powers of alter ego.
He went to Sardinia after the end of that conflict and died at Cagliari in 1807.
