= Army of Italy (France) =

Field army of the French Army stationed on the France-Italy border

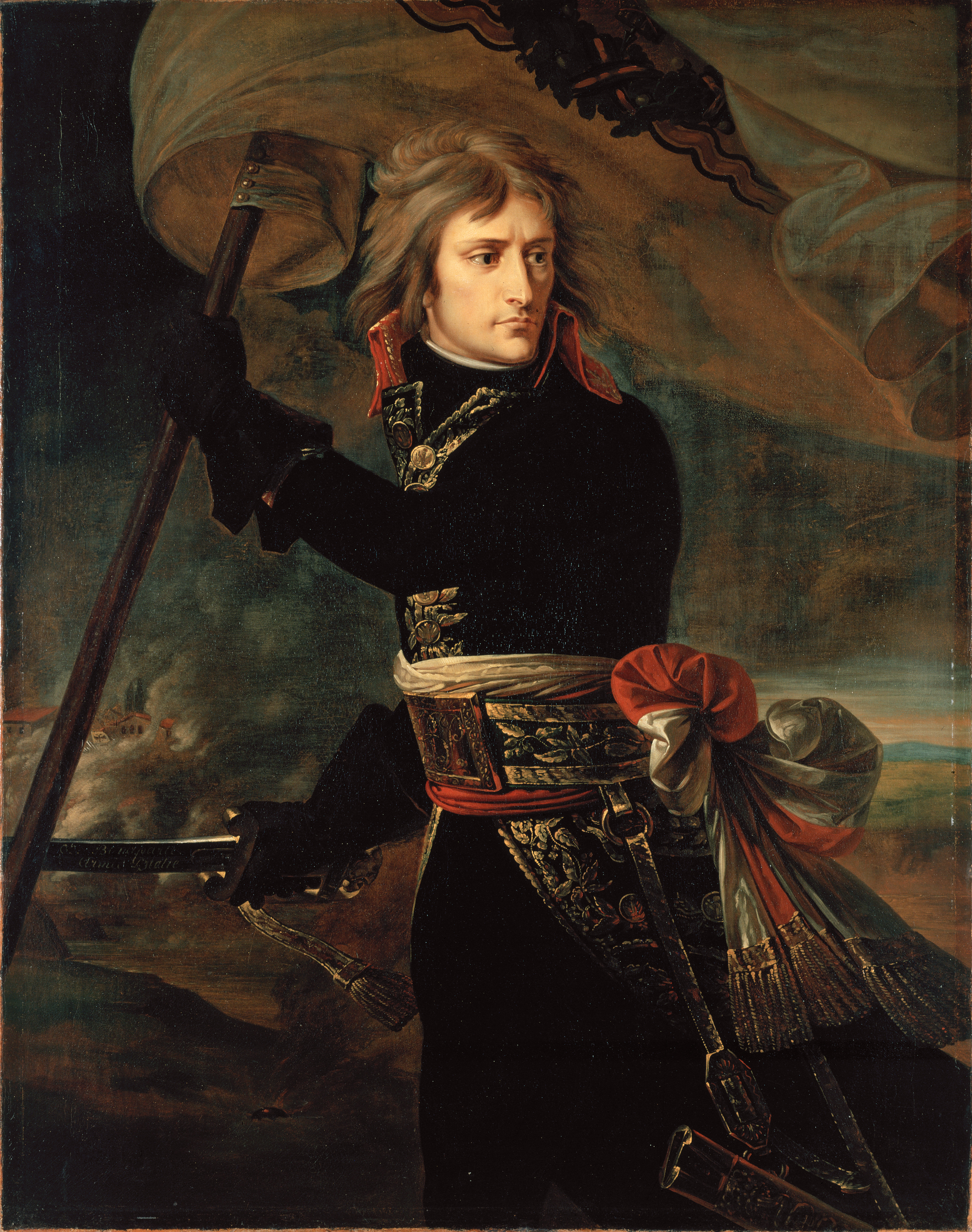
General Napoleon Bonaparte, commander of the Armée d'Italie on the bridge at Arcole

The Army of Italy (French: Armée d'Italie) was a field army of the French Army stationed on the Italian border and used for operations in Italy itself. It is best known for its role during the French Revolutionary Wars (in which it was one of the early commands of Napoleon Bonaparte, during his Italian campaign) and the Napoleonic Wars.

== History ==
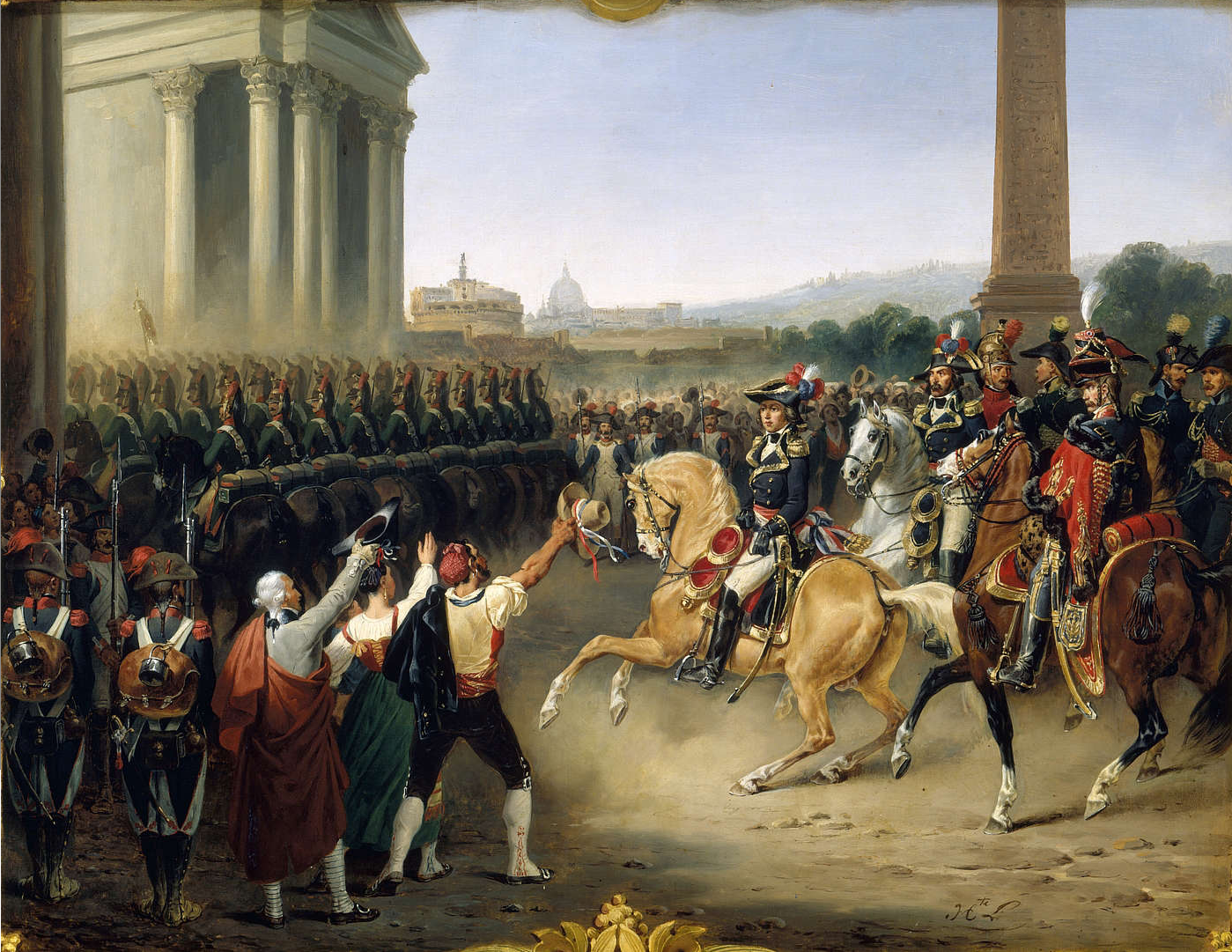
French Army entering Rome in 1798

=== Bonaparte's reforms ===
Poorly supplied (uniforms and shoes were rare), and only getting reinforcements irregularly, the Army of Italy was sometimes reduced to looting to survive. When Bonaparte arrived (he took up command on 27 March 1796), indiscipline was rife. Chouan songs were sung by the troops, and a company of the Dauphin was formed. All the while improving the supply system as much as possible, Bonaparte also reestablished discipline. He condemned officers who had cried Vive le roi ! (English: "Live the king!"), dismissed the 13th regiment of hussards for indiscipline and dissolved an entire regiment when it revolted at the end of March. Purged in this way, the Army of Italy was subsequently the most Jacobin of all the French armies.

Its first victories improved things – allowing better resupply and easing pay problems through "war contributions" from the conquered lands – but memoirs (though not official communiques) speak of individual or collective failures right up to 1797.

=== Reserve army ===
Much of the original Armée d'Italie became the Army of Egypt. Another army, originally called the armée de Réserve, was formed at Dijon on 8 March 1800 (17 ventôse year VIII) and took the title Armée d'Italie on 23 June 1800 (4 messidor year VIII) when it was merged with the remains of the original Armée d'Italie. The new army's first commander was General Masséna, followed by Bonaparte (as First Consul and "Commander in person") and General Berthier (its Général en chef from 2 April to 23 June 1800). It was under Berthier that this army beat the Austrians at the Battle of Marengo on 14 June 1800 (25 prairial year 8).

== Commanders ==
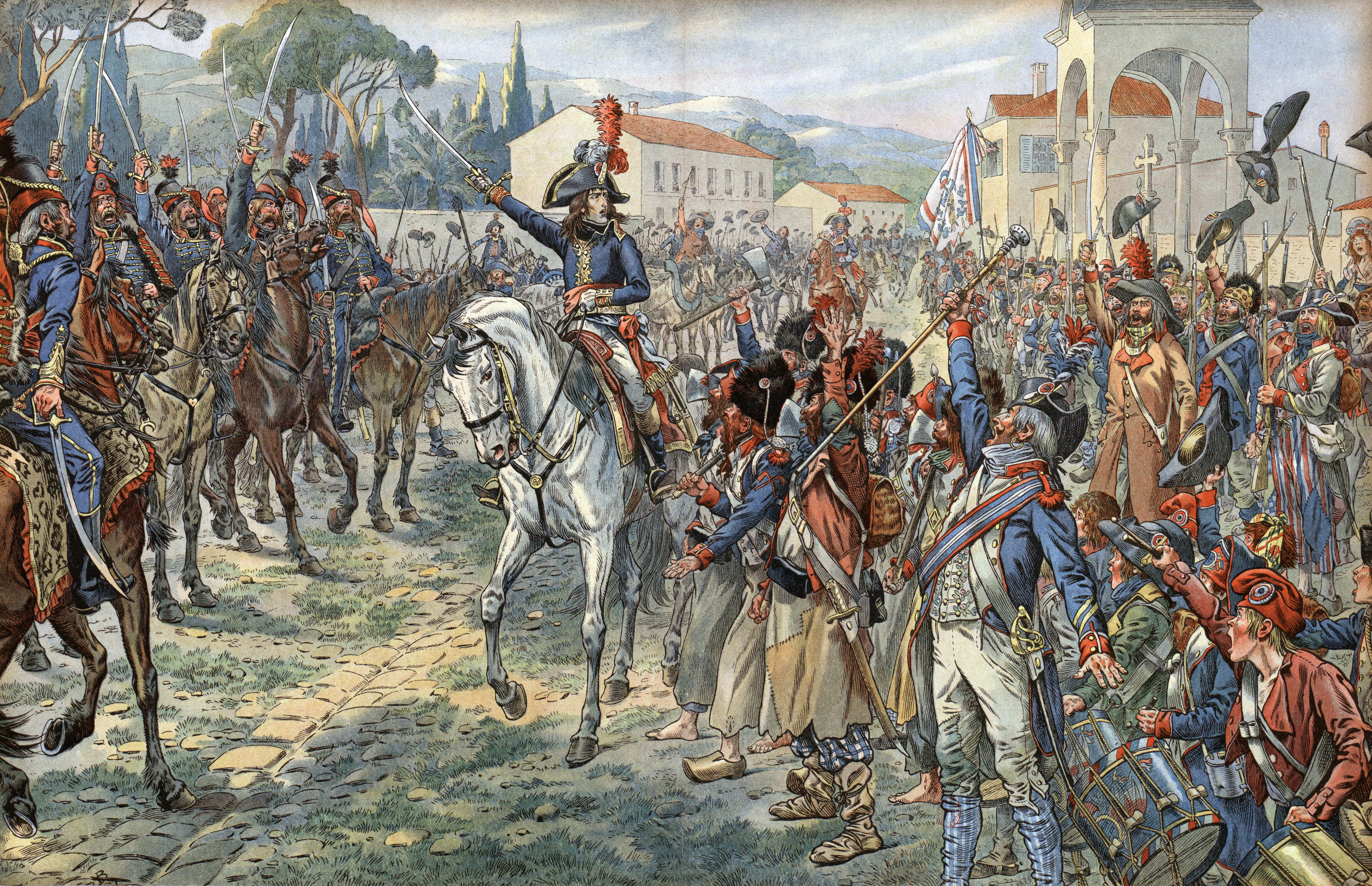
Soldiers of the Army of Italy saluting Napoleon in 1796

- from 7 November to 25 December 1792: General d'Anselme, with neither the title nor the prerogative of a general
- from 26 December 1792 to 9 February 1793, interim: maréchal de camp Brunet
- from 10 February to 4 May 1793: General Biron
- from 5 May to 8 August 1793: General Brunet; from 2 June subordinate to General Kellermann
- from 9 August 1793 to 20 November 1794: General du Merbion
- Army before Toulon (Armée devant Toulon):
  - from 5 September to 6 November 1793: General Carteaux
  - from 7 to 12 November, interim: General La Poype
  - from 13 to 15 November, provisionally until the arrival of General Dugommier: General Doppet
  - from 16 November to 28 December: General Dugommier with the title of General and commander of the Army of Italy (général en chef de l'armée d'Italie)
- from 29 December 1793 to 21 November 1794: General Pierre Jardat Dumerbion (with Napoleon Bonaparte and Andre Massena as subordinates)
- from 21 November 1794 to 5 May 1795: General Schérer
- from 6 May to 28 September 1795: General Kellermann, (Note: Made a Marshal of the Empire (maréchal d’Empire) or was in the staff of one.) commanded the merged Army of Italy and Army of the Alps (armée des Alpes), with the designation of the Army of Italy
- from 29 September 1795 to 26 March 1796: General Schérer, resigned
- from 27 March 1796 to 16 November 1797: General Bonaparte
- from 17 November to 21 December 1797, interim: General Kilmaine
- from 22 December 1797 to 3 April 1798: General Berthier
- from 4 April to 27 July 1798: General Brune
- from 28 July to 18 August 1798, interim: General Gaultier
- from 19 August to 31 October 1798: General Brune
- from 1 November 1798 to 31 January 1799: General Joubert, as part of the overall command of the Army of Rome (armée de Rome). From 11 to 25 December, the army's commander was effectively General Moreau.
- from 1 February to 6 March: General Delmas
- from 7 to 11 March 1799, provisional: General Bruneteto Sainte-Suzanne
- from 12 March to 26 April 1799: General Schérer, as part of his overall command of the Army of Naples (armée de Naples)
- from 27 April to 4 August 1799: General Moreau, as part of his overall command of the Army of Naples
- from 5 to 15 August 1799: General Joubert, commander of both the Army of Italy and the Army of the Alps, killed at the battle of Novi
- from 15 August to 20 September 1799: General Moreau
- from 21 September to 30 December 1799: General Championnet
- from 31 December 1799 to 5 January 1800: General Suchet
- from 6 to 15 January 1800, interim: General Marbot
- from 16 January to 16 June 1800: General Masséna
- from 17 to 24 June 1800, interim: General Suchet
- from 25 June to 21 August 1800: General Masséna
- from 22 August 1800 to 7 March 1801: General Brune
- from 8 March to 27 August 1801, interim: General Moncey

== Campaigns and battles ==
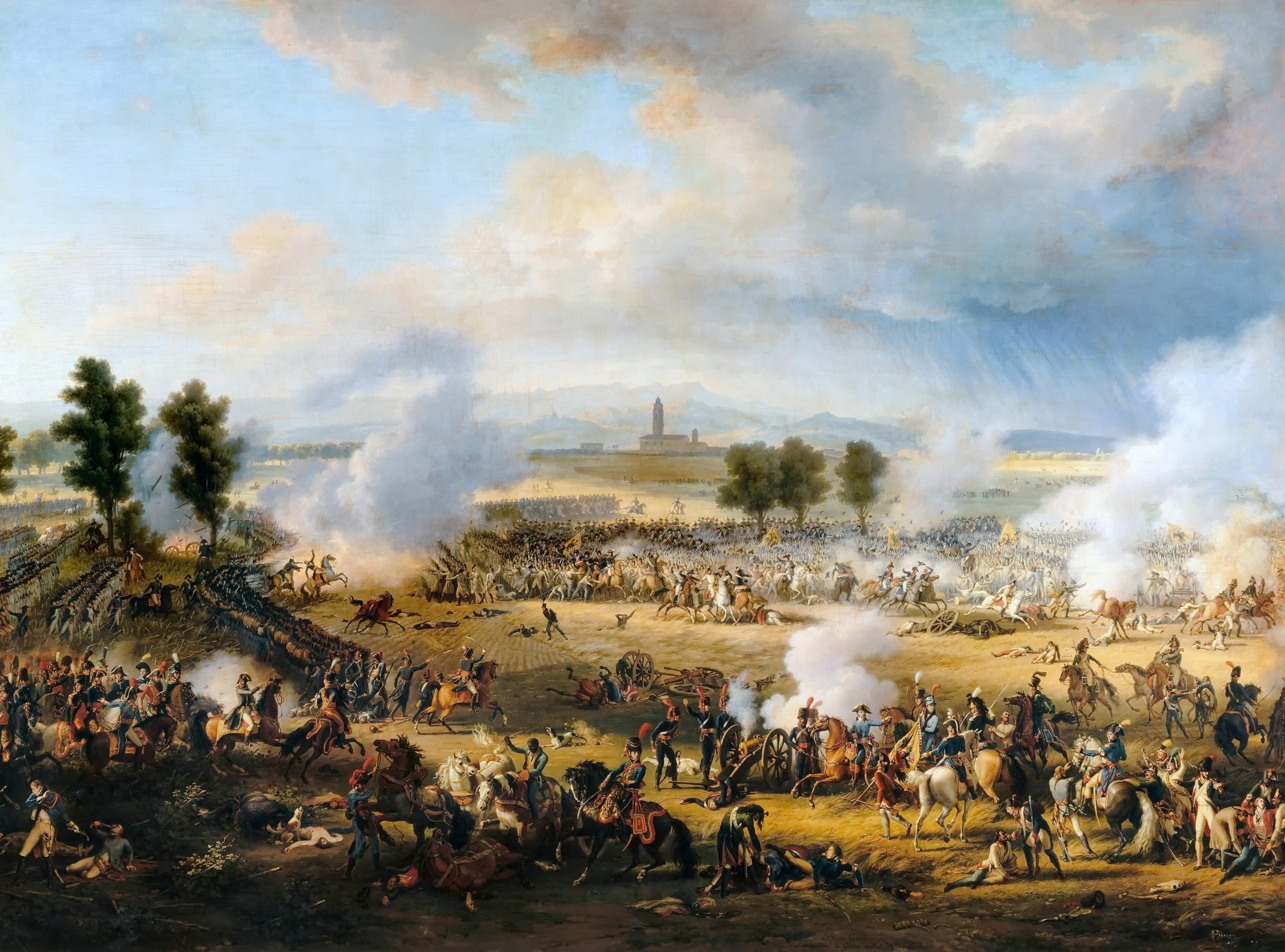
The Battle of Marengo by Louis-François Lejeune, 1801

- 21 September 1794: First Battle of Dego (won thanks to its artillery commander, Bonaparte)
- 24 November 1795: Battle of Loano (unexploited victory achieved thanks to the infantry commander, Masséna)
- First Italian Campaign
- Second Italian Campaign

=== 1805–1814 ===
Armée d'Italie participated in the war of the Third Coalition (1805), in the battles of Verona and Caldiero in northern Italy, under André Massena. During the war of the Fifth Coalition (1809), Armée d'Italie was commanded by Eugène de Beauharnais, and fought the Austrians at Sacile, Caldiero, Piave, and Raab. In 1813–1814 Eugéne fought the Austrians with his army in northern Italy (f.e., the Battle of Mincio took place).

== Sources ==
- C. Clerget: Tableaux des armées françaises pendant les guerres de la Révolution (Librairie militaire 1905).
