= Gaspard Jean-Baptiste Brunet =

French general

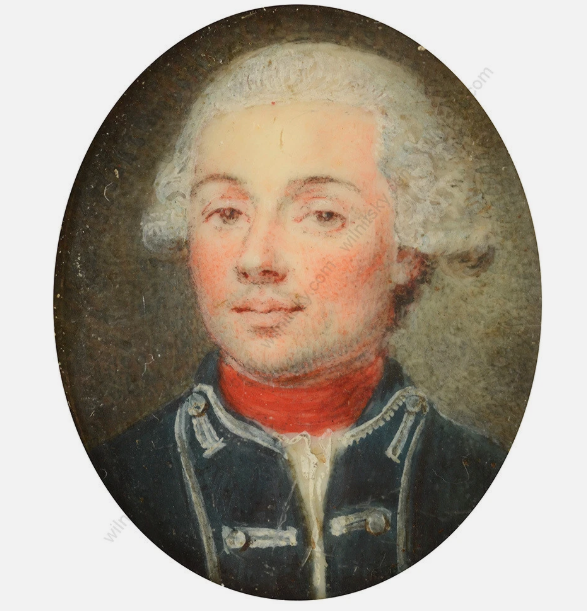
- Gaspard Jean-Baptiste Brunet when he served in the Lorraine Infantry Regiment.
- Born: 14 June 1734; Valensole, France
- Died: 15 November 1793 (aged 59); Paris, France
- Military career
- Allegiance: Kingdom of France; France
- Branch: Artillery, Infantry
- Service years: (Kingdom of France) 1755–1792 (France) 1792–1793
- Rank: General of Division
- Conflicts: Seven Years' War; War of the First Coalition; Battle of Sospel; Battle of Saorgio
- Awards: Order of Saint-Louis, 1773

Gaspard Jean-Baptiste Brunet (French: [ɡaspaʁ ʒɑ̃ batist bʁynɛ]; 14 June 1734 – 15 November 1793) commanded the French Army of Italy during the French Revolutionary Wars and was executed during the Reign of Terror. Despite this fate his son Jean Baptiste Brunet also became a French general. From the minor nobility, he entered the French Royal Army as a gunner in 1755, transferred to an infantry unit and fought in the Seven Years' War. He received the Order of Saint-Louis and was promoted to lieutenant colonel in 1779.

He became maréchal de camp (general of brigade) in 1791 and served in the Army of Italy under Jacques Bernard d'Anselme in 1792. After a brief stint as interim army commander in the winter of 1792–93, he was promoted general of division and assumed the duties of commander-in-chief from May to August 1793. His defeat at Saorgio and the suspicions of the all-powerful representatives on mission caused him to be arrested, imprisoned and guillotined.

BRUNET is one of the names inscribed under the Arc de Triomphe, on Column 23.

Military offices
| Preceded by Jacques Bernard d'Anselme | Interim Commander-in-chief of the Army of Italy; 26 December 1792–9 February 1793 | Succeeded by Armand Louis de Gontaut, Duke of Biron |
| Preceded by Armand Louis de Gontaut, Duke of Biron | Commander-in-chief of the Army of Italy; 5 May–8 August 1793 | Succeeded by Pierre Jadart Dumerbion |
