= Pierre Jadart Dumerbion =

- Born: 30 April 1737; Montmeillant, Champagne, France
- Died: 25 February 1797 (aged 59) Montmeillant, Ardennes, France
- Allegiance: France
- Branch: Infantry
- Service years: 1754–1795
- Rank: General of Division
- Conflicts: Seven Years' War; French Revolutionary Wars
- Awards: Order of Saint-Louis, 1779

Pierre Jadart Dumerbion or Pierre Jadart du Merbion (30 April 1737 – 25 February 1797) joined the French army as a junior officer in 1754 and fought in the Seven Years' War. As an experienced officer, he was promoted to colonel in 1792 at the start of the French Revolutionary Wars. He soon became a general officer and found himself commanding the Army of Italy. In April 1794 he won the Battle of Saorgio over the armies of Habsburg Austria and the Kingdom of Sardinia-Piedmont by using a strategic plan drawn up by his newly appointed artillery officer, Napoleon Bonaparte. Though he was the victor, Dumerbion was unable to personally take the field because of his age and poor health. In September 1794, his army again beat the Coalition forces at the First Battle of Dego. He retired in 1795 and died in 1797. DUMERBION is one of the names inscribed under the Arc de Triomphe on Column 23.
