= Battle of Epierre =

1793 battle of the Alps Campaign

Coordinates: 45°27′17″N 6°17′43″E

- Part of the Alps Campaign
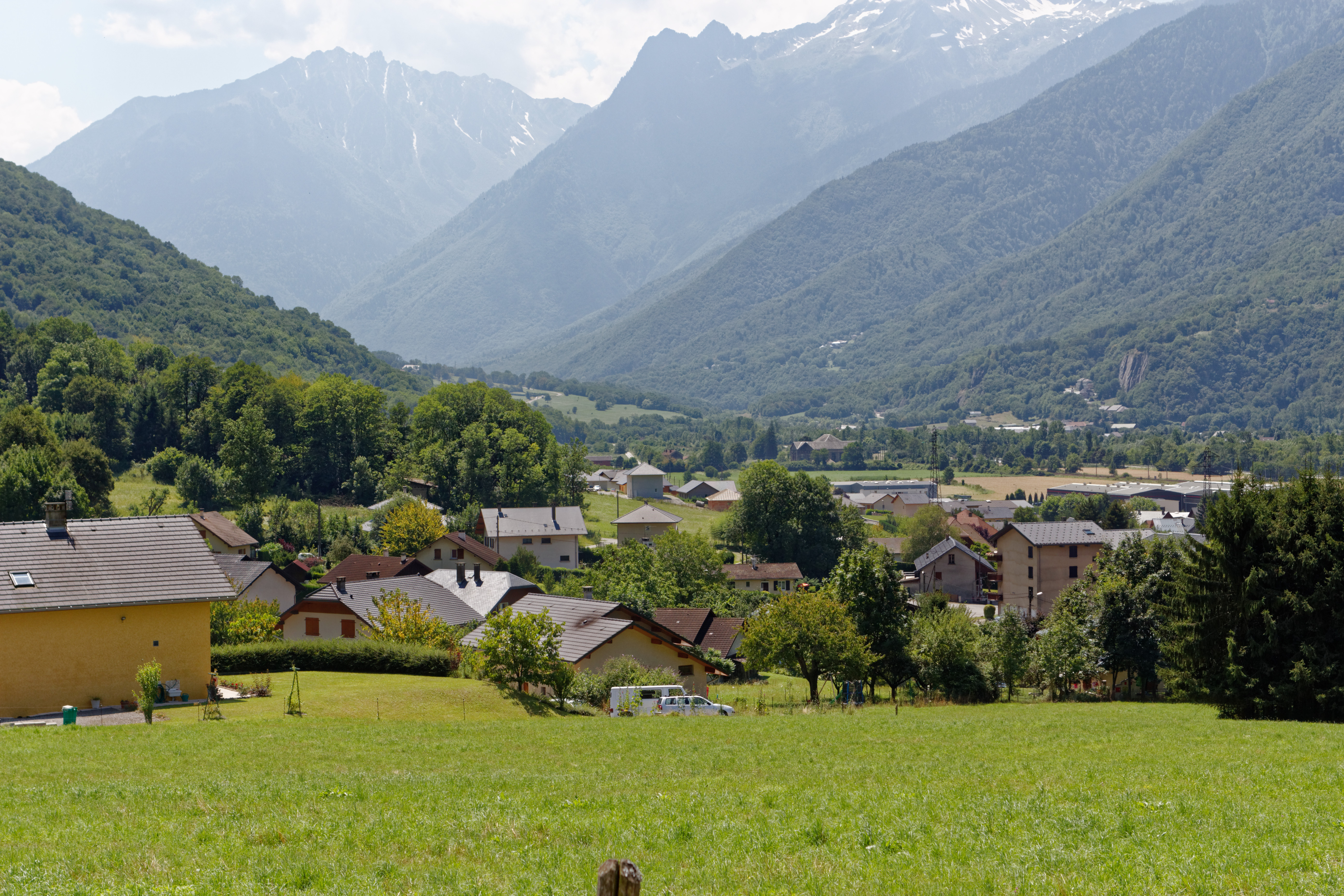
- View of Épierre in the Maurienne valley
Date	15 September 1793
Location	Épierre, Savoie, France
Result	French victory

Belligerents
(French First Republic) Republican France	Kingdom of Sardinia

Commanders and leaders
(French First Republic) François Kellermann (French First Republic) Jean Denis Ledoyen	(Kingdom of Sardinia) Duke of Montferrat (Kingdom of Sardinia) Marquis of Cordon

Strength
Campaign: 12,000; Battle: 8,000	Campaign: 18,000; Battle: 6,000

Casualties and losses
Campaign: Unknown; Battle: 500	Campaign: 2,000; Battle: 1,000

The Battle of Epierre (15 September 1793) was part of a larger War of the First Coalition campaign that pitted a Republican French army led by François Christophe de Kellermann against a numerically stronger Kingdom of Sardinia-Piedmont army commanded by the Prince Maurizio, Duke of Montferrat. Under the overall leadership of the Austrian commander in chief Joseph Nikolaus De Vins, Montferrat launched an offensive in mid-August 1793 to recapture the Duchy of Savoy from the French. Because the French were preoccupied with the Siege of Lyon, the Piedmontese recovered most of the Maurienne and Tarentaise Valleys, but they were stopped just short of Albertville and the reconquest of Savoy. In September, Kellermann launched a counteroffensive in which he adroitly switched his troops between valleys in order to drive back the Piedmontese. At Épierre, the French under Jean-Denis Le Doyen defeated the Marquis of Cordon in a local action. By 8 October the Piedmontese abandoned all their gains and withdrew to the crests of the Graian Alps. In spite of his victory, the suspicious politicians in Paris put Kellermann in arrest and he was imprisoned until November 1794.

== Background ==
=== Peace ===
King Victor Amadeus III of Sardinia looked with disfavour on the French Revolution but refused to get involved in the troubles of his large neighbor. His sons-in-law the Count of Provence (who later became Louis XVIII) and his brother the Count of Artois (who later became Charles X) fled to the Kingdom of Sardinia during the revolution. The two sons-in-law caused tensions by plotting against the French government, but both left the kingdom by early 1791. Historically, many Frenchmen looked covetously upon the Duchy of Savoy and the County of Nice, Piedmont-Sardinian lands which were located on the French side of the Alpine crests. They argued that France must expand to her "natural frontiers". If France acted on this impulse, the geographic locations of Savoy and Nice would make them difficult to defend.

In July 1791, Victor Amadeus asked the Habsburg monarchy for help in case France invaded his kingdom. The Habsburgs owned the adjoining Duchy of Milan. It was tricky negotiating with the Habsburgs since they proved themselves capable of seizing a weaker nation's lands in the First Partition of Poland in 1773. The French government created the Army of the Midi on 13 April 1792 and ordered its commander General Anne-Pierre, marquis de Montesquiou-Fézensac to invade Savoy and Nice by 15 May 1792. Since, his army was not ready, Montesquiou could not obey his instructions, but the Sardinians were aware that the French were getting ready to attack. Victor Amadeus finally got an agreement for 8,000 Austrian soldiers under Feldmarschall-Leutnant Leopold Lorenz von Strassoldo to help defend the Kingdom of Sardinia-Piedmont when needed. The agreement was signed on 22 September, but it was already too late.

=== War ===
On 21 September 1792, the Army of the Midi under Montesquiou invaded Savoy. Montesquiou had approximately 25,000 soldiers in 33 infantry battalions, 11 cavalry squadrons, and some National Guards. He was opposed by 10,000–12,000 Piedmont-Sardinian troops. By 24 September, the French were in Chambéry. On 29 September, Lieutenant General Jacques Bernard d'Anselme with 10,000 troops occupied Nice against little resistance. The French invaders easily overcame their opponents with little fighting because the 70-year old Piedmontese commander General Lazary was incompetent. A fellow general, Charles-François Thaon, Count of Saint-André wrote, "Our War Office is badly constituted, badly directed and nothing in it is secret".

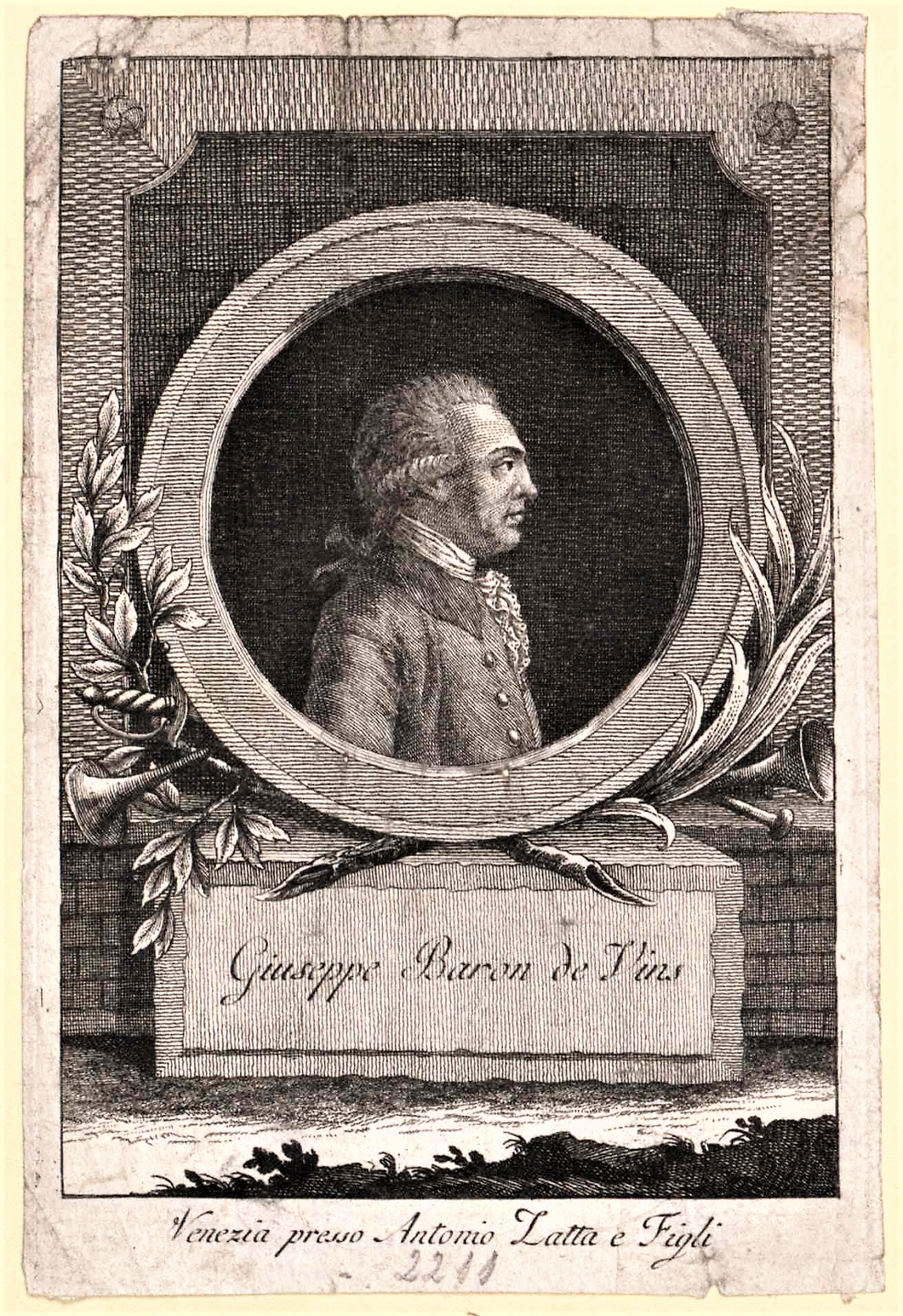
Joseph De Vins

On 1 October 1792, the French government split the Army of the Midi into the Army of the Alps and the Army of the Pyrenees. On 7 October, Anselme's force was separated from the Army of the Alps and named the Army of Italy. At this time, Swiss troops occupied Geneva and the French government demanded that Montesquiou deal with this threat. He negotiated a satisfactory treaty with the Swiss, but hostile politicians in the National Convention secured his arrest on 9 November on baseless charges. Tipped off in advance, Montesquiou fled to Switzerland on 13 November. D'Anselme was sacked on 16 December. Winter weather soon brought operations to a halt. Aghast at the ease at which his western lands had fallen, Victor Amadeus requested that Habsburg Austria send him a commander-in-chief. On 21 December 1792, the Habsburgs sent Feldzeugmeister Joseph Nikolaus De Vins, a 61 year old veteran of the Seven Years' War and the Austro-Turkish War.

In December 1792, Lieutenant General François Christophe de Kellermann took command of the Army of the Alps. Since many units had been sent to the Army of the Pyrenees, the army had only five regular regiments, 30 volunteer battalions, two regular cavalry regiments, and some independent companies. There were 30,000 men on the muster rolls but only 16,000–20,000 were fit for service. In May 1793 the Army of the Alps numbered 45,000 but it was hard to procure weapons for every soldier. The army's left (north) flank was south of Geneva in the Arve river valley, also called the Faucigny. Going south, the army defended the Isère river valley and its upper reaches, called the Tarentaise Valley; the Arc river valley, also called the Maurienne; the Durance river; and the Ubaye river. The right (south) flank was anchored by the fortified Camp de Tournoux. Kellermann proved to be an excellent organizer. During his command tenure, he set up depots with enough supplies to clothe 50,000 men and arm 32,000.

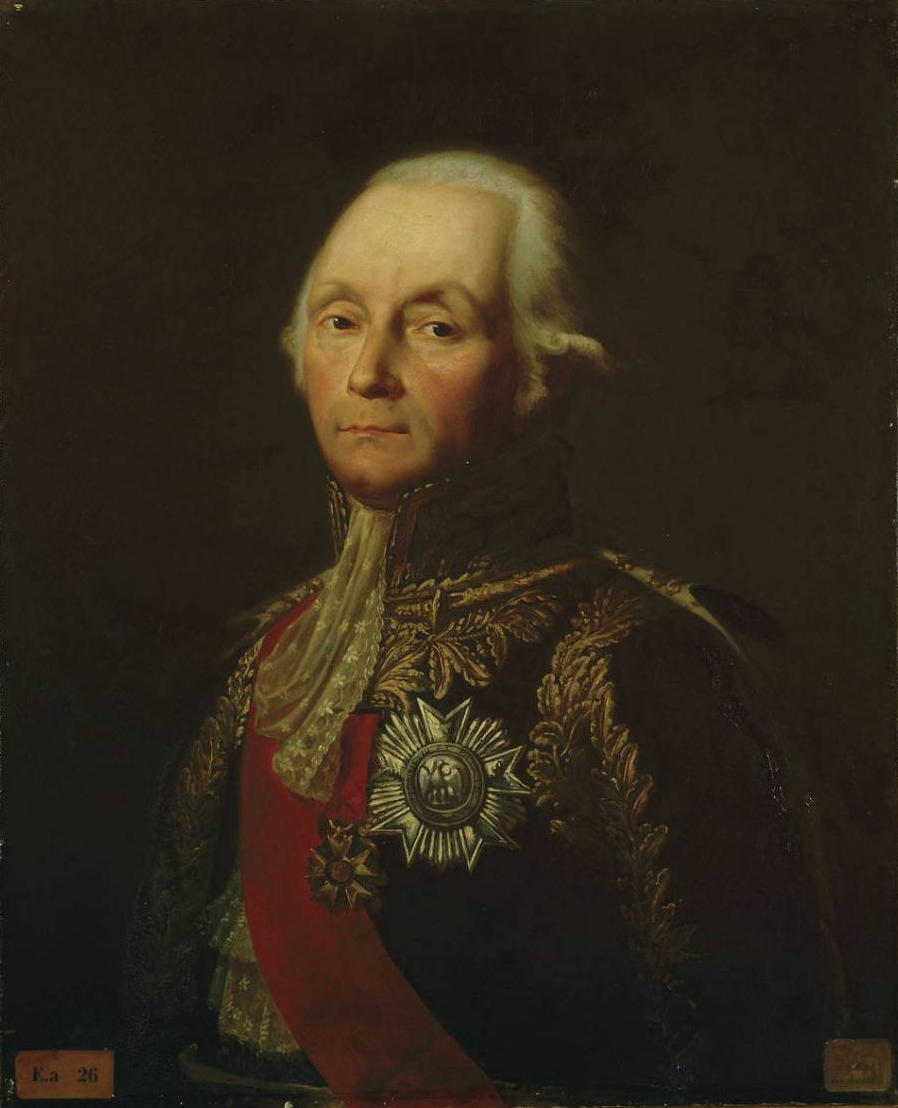
François de Kellermann

These events occurred during the Reign of Terror when popular suspicion fell upon many generals as traitors. Pierre Chépy, the political commissioner with the Army of the Alps believed that Kellermann was a secret Royalist. Chépy proposed to the Minister for Foreign Affairs that every general condemned to death should have his head struck off and hung upside down with a sign posted on his corpse, "This monster sold himself to the enemies of the country..." Marie-Jean Hérault de Séchelles and Philibert Simond, the representatives on mission with the Army of the Alps, opened Kellermann's mail and discovered that the commander preferred regular troops to the volunteers, wanted to hire Swiss mercenaries, and was willing to withdraw from some positions so that he could drill his raw troops. Horrified that their army commander might be a traitor, the representatives, some soldiers, and civil authorities cross-examined Kellermann for four hours. Keeping calm, Kellermann patiently convinced them that he was loyal to the government.

A revolt began brewing in Lyon on 29 May 1793. As early as 8 July, the representative Edmond Louis Alexis Dubois-Crancé wanted Kellermann to lead his army to Lyon, but the commander insisted on a written order. The leading Jacobin of Lyon, Joseph Chalier had a guillotine sent to that city from Paris. He planned to execute 900 counter-revolutionaries in Lyon, but he was seized instead. On 18 July, Chalier became a victim of his own guillotine. On 20 July, the National Convention ordered Kellermann to put down the revolt in Lyon. The general was reluctant, pointing out that moving against Lyon would cause him to remove troops needed to defend the Alpine border. Nevertheless, Kellermann set out with 10,000 infantry and 3,000 cavalry on 6 August. Eventually, 28,000 troops were required to bring the Siege of Lyon to a conclusion.

== Battle ==
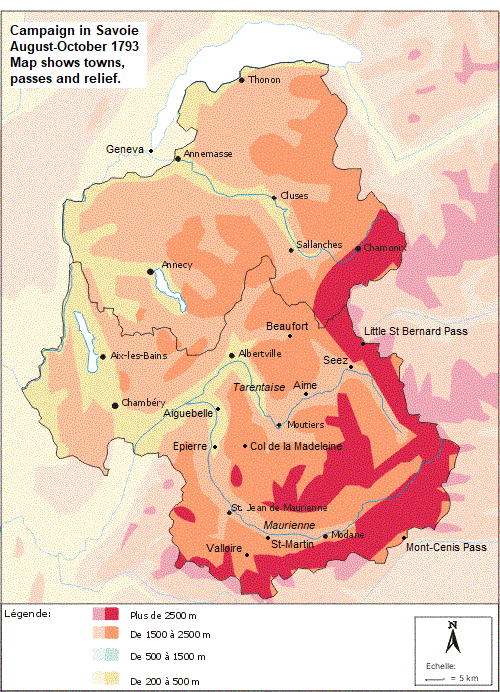
Savoie Campaign of August–October 1793

With Kellermann's attention focused on Lyon, the Piedmontese launched the attack that he had predicted. In his leisurely way, De Vins had drawn up a plan to invade Savoy and Nice at the same time. The Austrian commander-in-chief wanted the Duke of Montferrat to move against Savoy, but he expected to direct the day-to-day operations from Turin. This was unrealistic because of the distance between Turin and the front. To complicate the situation, the Piedmontese officer corps loathed De Vins' chief of staff, the Austrian General-major Eugène-Guillaume Argenteau. The operation in Savoy began in August, which was very late in the season since the snows came early in the mountains.

On 14 August 1793, the Duke of Montferrat's column passed over the Little St Bernard Pass and swept down into the Tarentaise Valley. Farther south, the Marquis of Cordon's column crossed the Mont-Cenis Pass and moved into the Maurienne Valley. The defending division of General of Brigade François Joseph Thorillon Dubourg had General of Brigade Charles Philippe Badelaune's (or Bagdelonne's) brigade in the Tarentaise and General of Brigade Jean-Denis Le Doyen's brigade in the Maurienne. Montferrat's force clashed with Badelaune at Séez on 15 August and Moûtiers on 18 August, routing the French both times. Bourg-Saint-Maurice and the entrenched camp at Saint-Martin-d'Arc both fell into Montferrat's hands. Both brigades were driven back into the lower valleys. Badelaune finally took up a strong position at Albertville and Le Doyen set up a roadblock at Aiguebelle. Farther north, another Piedmontese detachment violated Swiss neutrality by crossing the Great St Bernard Pass and moved into the Arve valley, capturing Sallanches and driving the French back to Carouge near Geneva. Dubourg reported to Kellermann that if he were pressed back any farther, he must abandon Chambéry and withdraw to Fort Barraux.

Despite the crisis, the all-powerful political agents were obsessed with the internal revolt and would not allow Kellermann to leave the Siege of Lyon for more than four days at a time. Kellermann left Lyon on 19 August 1793 and did what he could to improve the defenses of Albertville and Aiguebelle on 21 August. He was back at Lyon on 24 August. However, the political agents in Savoy demanded the commander-in-chief's presence at the front and got their way. Kellermann hastened back to Savoy, leaving the Siege of Lyon to be carried out by Dubois-Crancé and General Jean-Baptiste Louis Philippe Demuy. The representative on mission Pierre Jacques Dherbez-Latour tried to dictate military instructions, but Kellermann and General of Brigade Louis Joseph Marie Rogon de Carcaradec stopped his interference by threatening to resign. Starting on 31 August, Kellermann traveled to Grenoble, Chambéry, and Montmélian in order to inspire the authorities. He called up some battalions from the Camp of Tournoux on the right flank, pressed ambulatory hospital patients into service, and got the political agents to call out the local National Guard.

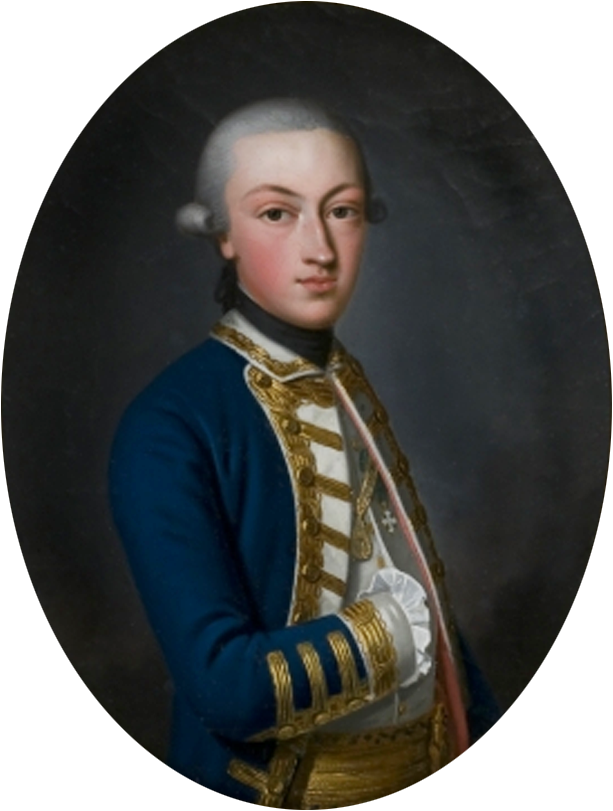
Duke of Monferrat

Because Montferrat failed to see the importance of pressing forward, his two columns remained separated and bottled up in the valleys. Kellermann exploited the Strategy of the central position by planning to operate first against Montferrat while holding back Cordon's force. Kellermann sent a column into the Doron valley toward Beaufort. This force threatened to outflank the Tarentaise by hooking south to Aime. Meanwhile, Kellermann's main force moved up the Isère River. Over in the Maurienne, Cordon was distracted by a French force on his left rear. During the Piedmontese invasion, a detachment of French soldiers withdrew up a side valley leading south from the Maurienne and was holding Valloire. Nevertheless, Cordon's wing marched down the Arc River on 10 September, hoping to be reinforced by Montferrat.

Cordon's advancing column found Le Doyen's troops setting up an artillery battery. One badly trained French gun crew rammed the round shot home before the powder charge and ruined the cannon. In the Battle of Epierre on 15 September, 8,000 French soldiers faced 6,000 Sardinians. The French lost 500 killed and wounded while inflicting 1,000 casualties on their adversaries. According to another source, the fighting occurred at Argentine, the next village below Épierre. By a strenuous effort the French hauled some mountain guns up to Saint-Alban-d'Hurtières from which they opened a surprise cannonade on the Piedmontese below, causing them to panic. No help from Montferrat appeared and Cordon fell back to Saint-Jean-de-Maurienne on 16 September.

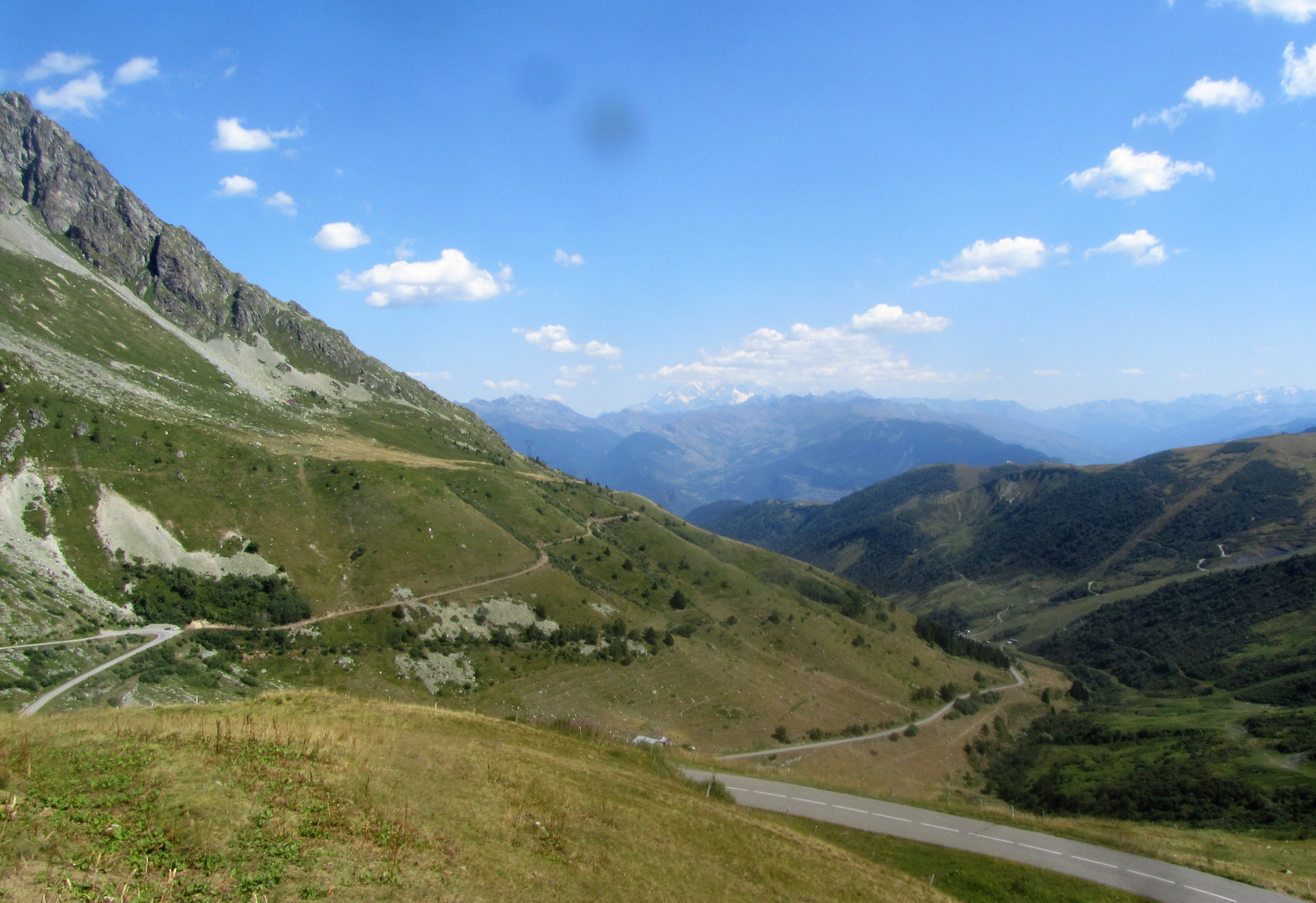
Col de la Madeleine in August

Snowfall stopped all operations until 27 September, when Le Doyen advanced up the Maurienne. On 29 September, Le Doyen's troops captured the southern exit of the Col de la Madeleine, cutting communications between Montferrat and Cordon. Kellermann's left column captured Beaufort on 28 September. The following day, Chef de brigade Jacques-Antoine de Chambarlhac de Laubespin seized the Cormet de Roselend, putting the French in a position to move south into the Tarentaise. Kellermann planned to attack Montferrat on 2 October, with the main column marching up the Tartenaise toward Moûtiers, Le Doyen coming across the Col de la Madeleine from the southeast, and Chambarlhac moving from Beaufort in the north. Seeing the trap prepared for his soldiers, Montferrat retreated up the valley. On 3 October, Kellermann pushed the last elements of Montferrat's column up the Little St Bernard Pass and the Tarentaise was clear.

Rapidly, Kellermann shifted troops across the Col de la Madeleine against Cordon's right flank. The reinforced French force at Valloire pressed north against Cordon's left flank. These threats compelled Cordon to withdraw to Modane. On 4 October, Kellermann came into the Maurienne via the Col des Encombrés and massed his available troops. By 8 October, the French drove Cordon's wing up the Mont-Cenis Pass, clearing the Maurienne. At the same time the Piedmontese in the north abandoned the Arve valley. Even the fanatic Chépy admitted that, "Kellermann has put himself at the head of the columns and has shown great activity". Though the poorly trained French soldiers were outnumbered, they managed to oust their enemies from Savoy. (Note: Valleys connect Valloire to Grenoble on the west and Briançon on the south.) From beginning to end, Kellermann with no more than 12,000 troops drove away 18,000 Piedmontese, inflicting 2,000 casualties.

== Aftermath ==
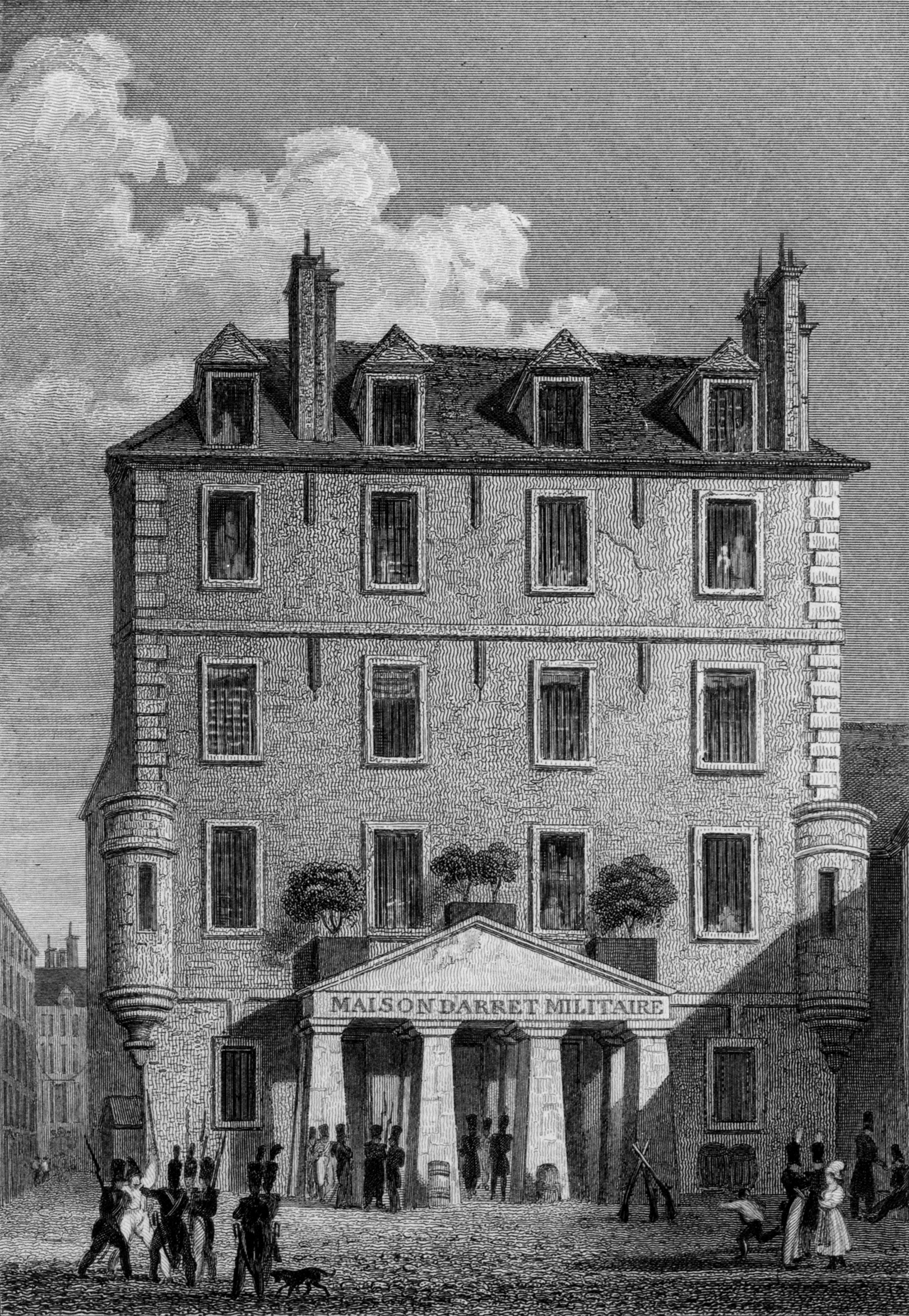
Prison de l'Abbaye

The National Convention decided that Kellermann had moved too slowly against the Lyon revolt. On 12 September 1793, the Committee of Public Safety dismissed Kellermann and appointed the ex-doctor General of Division François Amédée Doppet to succeed him in command. However, the order was not supposed to be given to Kellermann until Doppet arrived. When Doppet finally reached Lyon on 25 September, Dubois-Crancé placed the new commander in nominal charge of the siege, leaving Kellermann in charge of Savoy. Displeased with Kellermann's temporary retention, on 11 October the Committee of Public Safety ordered that,

Considering that General Kellermann has been for long convicted of having betrayed the Republic, that his dismissal, pronounced by the National Convention, was founded on the gravest motives, and cannot be contravened by any authority without a great danger to the Republic, Kellermann be at once placed in arrest, and sent to Paris.

Normally it was the representatives on mission who denounced the generals. In this case, the representatives with the Army of the Alps were pleased with Kellermann's performance, but the politicians in Paris demanded his arrest. On 12 October, the French government also ordered the arrest of Dubois-Crancé for not subduing Lyon quickly enough, but that politician managed to talk his way out of it. Fresh from his success against the Piedmontese, Kellermann received the order for his arrest on 16 October. He was supposed to be guarded by a detachment of gendarmes, but Doppet allowed him to proceed with a single officer of gendarmes. Kellermann left for Paris on 18 October and arrived at the Prison de l'Abbaye on 6 November 1793. Kellermann survived the Reign of Terror, possibly because he was the hero of the Battle of Valmy. He went on trial and was acquitted on 8 November 1794. Kellermann's rank was restored on 15 January 1795 and he assumed command of the Army of the Alps in March that year. Emperor Napoleon appointed Kellermann a Marshal of the Empire on 19 May 1804. Napoleon utilized Kellermann's talent as an organizer during the First French Empire, though he never again held a combat command.

== Notes ==
Footnotes

Citations
