= Alps Campaign (1792–1796) =

Campaign of the French Revolutionary Wars

- Part of the War of the First Coalition and Italian campaigns of the French Revolutionary Wars
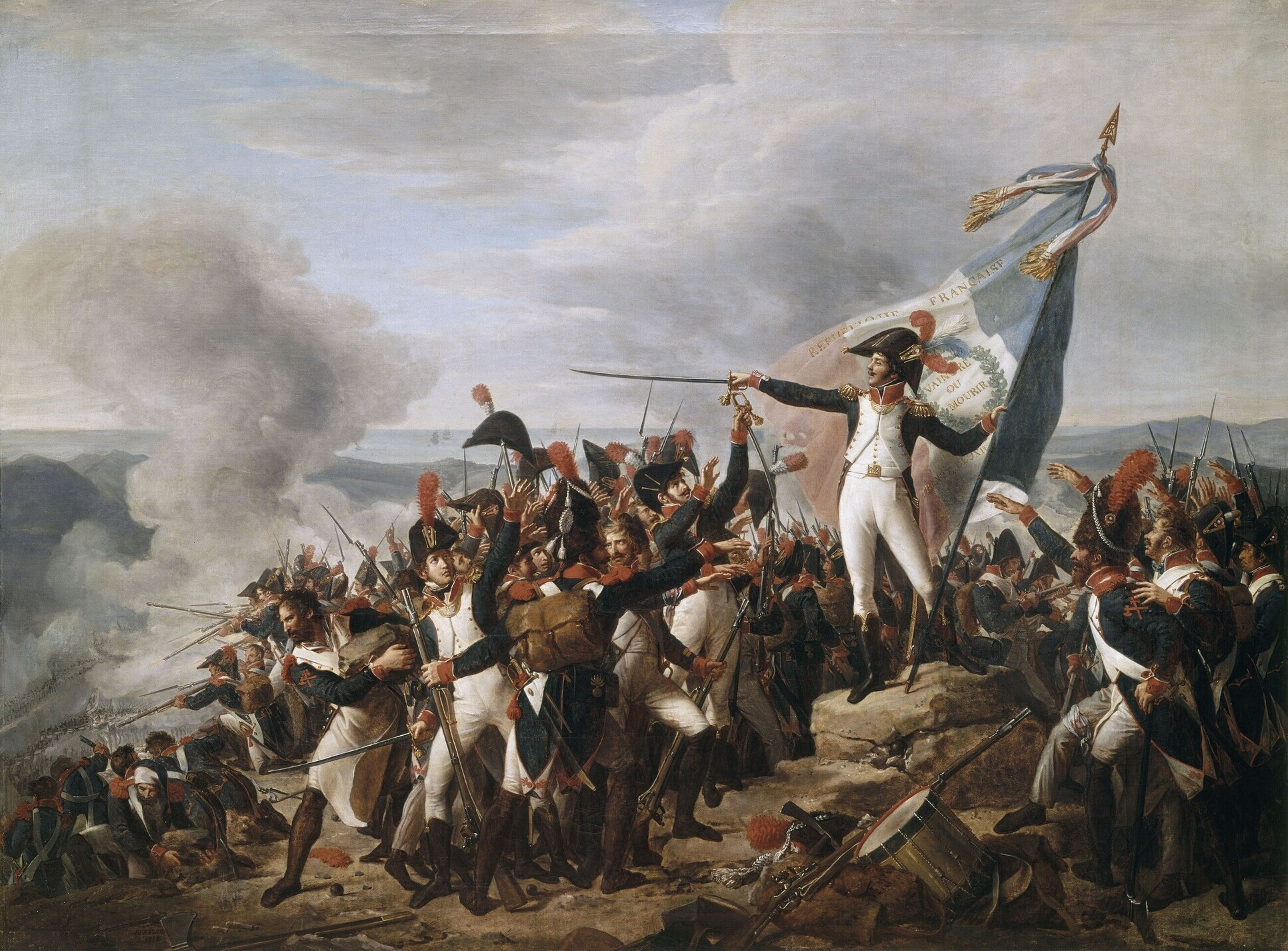
- The Battle of Montenotte, a major battle of the campaign
Date	15 September 1792 – 28 April 1796
Location	Piedmont, Savoy, County of Nice, Provence, and the Mediterranean Sea
Result	French victory: Armistice of Cherasco; Piedmont enters into a defensive alliance with France.
Territorial changes	Savoy and Nice are annexed by France and southern Piedmont comes under French military control

Belligerents
Kingdom of Sardinia (surrendered); Holy Roman Empire: Archduchy of Austria; Savoyard monarchist (surrendered); Duchy of Milan; Supported by: Kingdom of Great Britain (Kingdom of the Two Sicilies) Kingdom of Naples and Sicily; Kingdom of Spain (Kingdom of France) French Royalists; Kingdom of Corsica (Note: Client state created by the British after the occupation of Corsica in 1793.); Grand Duchy of Tuscany (Note: The British forced the reluctant Grand Duke to sign an anti-French military convention on 28 October 1793; however, on 4 February 1794 the Tuscan government signed a treaty of neutrality with France.); Duchy of Parma and Piacenza (Note: In 1794 the Duchies of Parma and Modena, bound by the Treaty of Aranjuez of 1752, were compelled to symbolically send a few units in support of the Austrians.); Duchy of Modena and Reggio	(France) French First Republic; Piedmontese Jacobins

Commanders and leaders
(Kingdom of Sardinia) Victor Amadeus III of Sardinia (surrendered) (Kingdom of Sardinia) Charles Emmanuel of Savoy (surrendered) (Kingdom of Sardinia) Victor Emmanuel of Savoy (surrendered) (Kingdom of Sardinia) Benedetto of Savoy (surrendered) (Kingdom of Sardinia) Charles Felix of Savoy (surrendered) (Holy Roman Empire) Joseph Nikolaus De Vins (Holy Roman Empire) Joseph Maria von Colloredo (Holy Roman Empire) Giovanni Provera (Kingdom of Great Britain) Samuel Hood (Kingdom of the Two Sicilies) Francesco Caracciolo (Kingdom of the Two Sicilies) Fabrizio Pignatelli di Cerchiara (Spain) Juan de Lángara y Huarte (Kingdom of France) Jean-Honoré de Trogoff de Kerlessy #	(France) Napoleon Bonaparte (France) François Christophe Kellermann (WIA) (France) André Masséna (France) Anne-Pierre de Montesquiou-Fézensac (France) Jean Mathieu Philibert Sérurier (France) Barthélemy Louis Joseph Schérer (France) Gaspard de Brunet (France) Jacques Bernard d'Anselme (France) Jacques François Dugommier # (France) Lazare Carnot (France) Pierre François Charles Augereau (France) Barthélemy Catherine Joubert (France) Armand Louis de Gontaut-Biron (executed) (France) Antoine Joseph Santerre (France) Pierre Jadart Dumerbion # Giovanni Antonio Ranza

The Alps Campaign was military campaign during War of the First Coalition, fought as part of the French Revolutionary Wars. It was waged primarily by the Kingdom of Sardinia and the Austrian Habsburg Monarchy, supported by Great Britain, Spain, and other states, against the French First Republic from 21 September 1792 to 28 April 1796, the date of the Armistice of Cherasco. The conflict took place along the Alpine front that geographically separates Italy from France.

The signing of peace with France opened a period of both internal and external tensions for Piedmont. Republican movements pushed for the fall of the monarchy, then represented by Charles Emmanuel IV, son of Victor Amadeus III, while the emergence of the neighboring sister republics—the Ligurian Republic and the Cisalpine Republic—repeatedly triggered diplomatic incidents that inflamed internal opposition to the kingdom. Paradoxically, until December 1798, the survival of the Savoyard monarchy depended on French interest in maintaining the status quo in Piedmont. Following the Sardinian refusal to declare war on the Kingdom of Naples, however, General Joubert, acting on instructions from the Directory, occupied the Piedmontese territory still under Savoyard control, proclaimed the establishment of the Piedmontese Republic, and forced the king to flee to Sardinia.

== Background ==
In the early phases of the French Revolution, the Piedmontese closely followed political developments in France, legitimately concerned that popular uprisings and the very problems afflicting the centuries old monarchy beyond the Alps might also spread within their own kingdom, especially in the Nice region and in Savoy, where large numbers of French aristocrats were finding temporary refuge, and in Sardinia, a region historically distant from the Savoyard court, where it was feared that revolution similar to those that had affected Corsica in previous decades might break out as well.

King Victor Amadeus III, a staunch supporter of the divine legitimacy of monarchy and a deeply religious man, regarded the increasingly anti-monarchical and anti-Catholic positions adopted by the revolutionaries as abhorrent. The arrival of the Count of Artois, the dukes of Berry and of Angoulême and their families—who were moreover related to the House of Savoy—only further radicalised the positions of the king and the court of Turin, within which a strong reactionary movement was growing. In a short time, Turin, and more generally the Savoyard state itself, became a safe destination for French nobility fleeing the climate of increasing violence and hatred directed against them that was spreading throughout France.

With the exception of Savoy, which by language and geographical position was more closely linked to France and where episodes of vandalism and violence clearly inspired by revolutionary ideas were recorded, in the rest of the kingdom, at least until 1791, the ideals of the French Revolution seemed to pass largely unnoticed, ignored by most of the population except for a few isolated groups of students and intellectuals. The rare manifestations of dissent were suppressed, while attempting to avoid unnecessary bloodshed. As part of his containment policy, Victor Amadeus sought to limit further entry of foreigners into his realm, especially French citizens, who were considered likely instigators of unrest. To this end, in 1792 he issued a law preventing anyone without a special passport from entering the kingdom. While keeping a vigilant eye on developments in France, the other European powers sought a way to resolve the complex social crisis underway and restore Louis XVI to the French throne, albeit each for different reasons. For example, the Holy Roman Emperors Joseph II and later Leopold II acted out of personal interest, since Marie Antoinette was their sister, while the House of Savoy was concerned for the stability and integrity of its dominions, which were perceived as being gravely threatened, especially in the event of a new war with France. In any case, despite the shared belief in the necessity of intervening in favour of the French monarchy, the various sovereigns lacked a concrete plan and instead sought to exploit the situation for their own advantage.

The failed Flight to Varennes by Louis XVI acted as an initial catalyst, bringing the Piedmontese and the Austrians closer together diplomatically. In an initial informal agreement, the emperor committed to sending several troops to Milan and to providing the Savoyards with the services of one of his generals. Furthermore, the two monarchs agreed to come to each other's aid in the event of a war sparked by revolutionary unrest. Meanwhile, the Austrian emperor met with the King of Prussia, and after several discussions with the Count of Artois, the two reached a formal agreement, drafted more to appease the French émigrés in Austria than out of genuine necessity. In its final paragraphs, the treaty added a brief declaration stating that Austria and Prussia would work in favour of the King of France, enabling him to govern his country in the manner he deemed best. Since the meeting focused primarily on the Partitions of Poland and the conclusion of the Austro-Turkish War (1788–1791), and given Spain's reservations and the United Kingdom's opposition to a joint action against France, the Declaration of Pillnitz proved vague and ultimately counterproductive, as it distanced the two European powers from a “moderate” position and made them appear as enemies of the ongoing revolution in France. The first foundations of an anti-French coalition had nevertheless been laid.

Tensions between Austria and France increased further the following year after the death of Emperor Leopold and the accession to the throne of his young son Francis II. The Jacobins pressured the king to intervene diplomatically with the new emperor in order to convince him to dismantle all agreements aimed at destroying the revolution. General Dumouriez, politically aligned with the revolutionaries, was sent to Vienna. When faced with Austrian opposition, Dumouriez responded with an ultimatum. Francis again refused, and war consequently became inevitable. Victor Amadeus, given the nature of the conflict and reassure by Vienna that the theatre of war would remain confined to the north, hastened to deploy his forces to defend the borders as a purely precautionary measure. While the war raged on the Rhine front, with Austria and the Kingdom of Prussia engaged against French armies, Victor Amadeus attempted to unite the Italian states in a collective effort against France, in order to prevent the dangerous revolutionary ideas from spreading among the population of the peninsula. Support for this initiative was minimal, primarily because, as had historically always been the case, each Italian state pursued its own interests without regard for the broader picture. Only the Emperor, in his capacity as Duke of Milan and ruler of the Duchy of Mantua, was favourably disposed towards the plan. Dumouriez questioned the Piedmontese minister regarding alleged movements of heavy artillery in Savoy, the presence of French émigrés in Nice, and the suspected concentration of Austrian troops near Milan, from where they could conveniently enter Piedmont. He was quickly dismissed, as the first two claims were false and the third, while well-founded, was an Austrian matter rather than a Piedmontese one. This response pleased the French governing bodies, which viewed Piedmontese neutrality in the ongoing conflict favourably.

The situation was thrown into crisis by the affair involving minister Charles-Louis Huguet de Sémonville. Tasked with travelling to Turin, the French minister, temporarily resident in Genoa, crossed the border between the maritime republic and the Savoyard monarchy without the special passport introduced that same year by the local authorities. Upon reaching Alessandria, Sémonville was stopped by the city's governor on the direct orders of the king and was politely invited to return to Genoa. The reasons behind this gesture were quite different, and the passport issue was little more than a convenient pretext to block the republican diplomat, who was regarded by many as an agitator and instigator of unrest. The repercussions of the Sémonville affair were immense. Dumouriez, furious at the treatment of his compatriot, demanded immediate explanations from the court of Turin but was dissatisfied with their responses. Consequently, in early May he informed Generals Montesquiou and d’Anselme, commanders of the Army of the Alps and the Army of the Var, to keep their troops ready in anticipation of retaliation.

A few days earlier, on 20 April, Austria and France had officially entered into war. The first clashes demonstrated that the French army, following the mass flight of its officers, had much ground to recover and was not yet on par with the other European armies. Dumouriez, who had intended to invade Savoy as early as May, was forced to postpone his plans. While fighting started between Belgium and northeastern France, the Piedmontese army began to mobilise: About 40,000 men had already been organised into three armies to defend Savoy, Nice, and the Alpine passes.

With the start of September, the situation began to change. Brunswick, who had penetrated in French territory at the head of an Austro-Prussian army, was halted at the Battle of Valmy, and buoyed by the ensuing enthusiasm, the Republic was proclaimed two days later. The tensions that had characterised relations between France and Piedmont finally led to inevitable consequences: on 10 September the French government ordered General Montesquiou to advance into Savoy, and on 15 September the two countries officially entered into war.

== The Campaign ==
=== Campaign in 1792 ===
Following the deposition and execution of French King the Louis XVI and the proclamation of the Republic on the 21 September 1792, and since French wanted to invade Nice and Savoy, Victor Amadeus III decided to ally with Austria by signing the so-called “September Convention”, through which the Austrians would assign approximately 90,000 soldiers as reinforcements to the Piedmontese and would assume control of the allied army under the command of General Joseph Nikolaus De Vins, in the role of Inspector General.

Meanwhile, French movements became openly hostile, inciting populations of the Dauphiné and Provence against the neighbouring Savoyards and Niçards. In addition, the defeatism of the Piedmontese generals tasked with defending the ancient transalpine provinces did the rest: General Jean-Baptiste de Lazary who was commander in Savoy, withdrew without a fight, allowing Chambéry to be occupied by the French forces of Montesquiou-Fézensac on 24 September; the Swiss general Eugène de Courten, informed of the lack of cover from the north, withdrew in an orderly manner toward the Maritime Alps, leaving the Nice region in the hands of the French general d’Anselme.

The reaction in Turin to these territorial losses was nevertheless restrained. The Marquis of Cordon, Victor-Amédée Sallier de la Tour, obtained the dismissal of Lazary, who was nonetheless honourably retired for the valour he had shown during the War of the Austrian Succession. De Courten, on the other hand, was replaced by his rival, the Count of Sant’Andrea, Carlo Francesco Thaon di Revel, and ended up governing Cuneo, receiving the title of Marquis of Sampeyre. Command of the Piedmontese army was nominally in the hands of the king, Victor Amadeus III; in practice, however, real control lay with his sons and his half-brother, the Duke of Chablais, even though they were not directly involved in camp life. Alongside the strongly anti-French “Piedmontese party”, an “Austrian party” had meanwhile emerged, led by the octogenarian De Vins, markedly more cautious and inclined toward a defensive—if not containment—approach to French successes. The Duke of Aosta, the future king Victor Emmanuel I, was opposed to interference from Vienna and created a sort of “secret council”, also in protest against the laxity and lack of determination of his brother, the Prince of Piedmont. Meanwhile, control of the Mediterranean was also on the French agenda, and the Sardinian flotilla was certainly unable to address it adequately. The Republic of Genoa, hostile to the Sardinian state for centuries, guaranteed its neutrality, if not covert collaboration with France. The Grand Duchy of Tuscany, although ruled by an Austrian archduke, Ferdinand III, sought to remain outside and neutral in conflict, while only the Kingdom of Naples appeared interested in countering French interests, thus presenting itself as a probable future Mediterranean naval power. However, in December 1792 the French navy carried out a demonstration of force at Naples, wrecking any Neapolitan dreams of naval supremacy. Assistance finally came from the United Kingdom, which had every interest in opposing French expansionism: in the spring of 1793 the courts of Turin and London signed a cooperation agreement against France, arousing considerable controversy in Vienna.

=== Unsuccessful counteroffensive in 1793 ===
The year 1793 opened with the Austro-Piedmontese army deployed along the Alps and divided into four army corps. Within the various general staffs, both Piedmontese and Austrian elements coexisted. Although the king formally remained captain-general, strategic planning was effectively handled by the Austrian general De Vins. Relations between the allies were poor: the Count of Sant’Andrea, for instance, was in constant disagreement with Colli. Rivalries and jealousies also plagued the Piedmontese commanders themselves, to the point that the first two army corps were placed under the nominal command of the Duke of Chablais in order to mitigate tensions between Bertone and the Marquis of Cordon. Similarly, suspicions of betrayal of republican ideals, sympathy for the former regime, and the perceived inefficiency of several generals led to transfers or summons to Paris. General Montesquiou-Fézensac, for example, after occupying Savoy during the previous campaign, was accused of collusion with the government of the Republic of Geneva. Fearing reprisals, he chose to cross the border and take refuge in Switzerland. From Paris, General François-Christophe Kellermann was sent to replace him. Nor did d’Anselme fare better: after occupying the Nice region, he unsuccessfully attempted to seize Oneglia, a Savoyard-held coastal town on the Ligurian Riviera. This failure, combined with difficulties in maintaining discipline among his troops, earned him the hostility of the National Convention, which recalled him to Paris and replaced him with General Gaspard de Brunet.

Despite this climate of suspicion, there were nonetheless grounds for optimism. The renewed Anglo-Piedmontese understanding and the support that London guaranteed to the Kingdom of Naples, together with the fleet of Spain, offered Piedmont a chance to expel the French from the Alps and possibly advance as far as the Dauphiné, where many sympathisers of the royalist cause were reportedly taking refuge. The Kingdom of Sardinia, together with the Austrians, would therefore lead two offensives—one in Savoy and one in Nice—while the navies of Great Britain, Spain, and Naples would operate against Provence, particularly the military port of Toulon. Should the Savoyard offensives succeed, forces advancing from Nice would link up with their allies farther west, while from Savoy it would be possible to reach Lyon, thanks to the presumed support of the local population.

=== French military operations in the Nice region ===
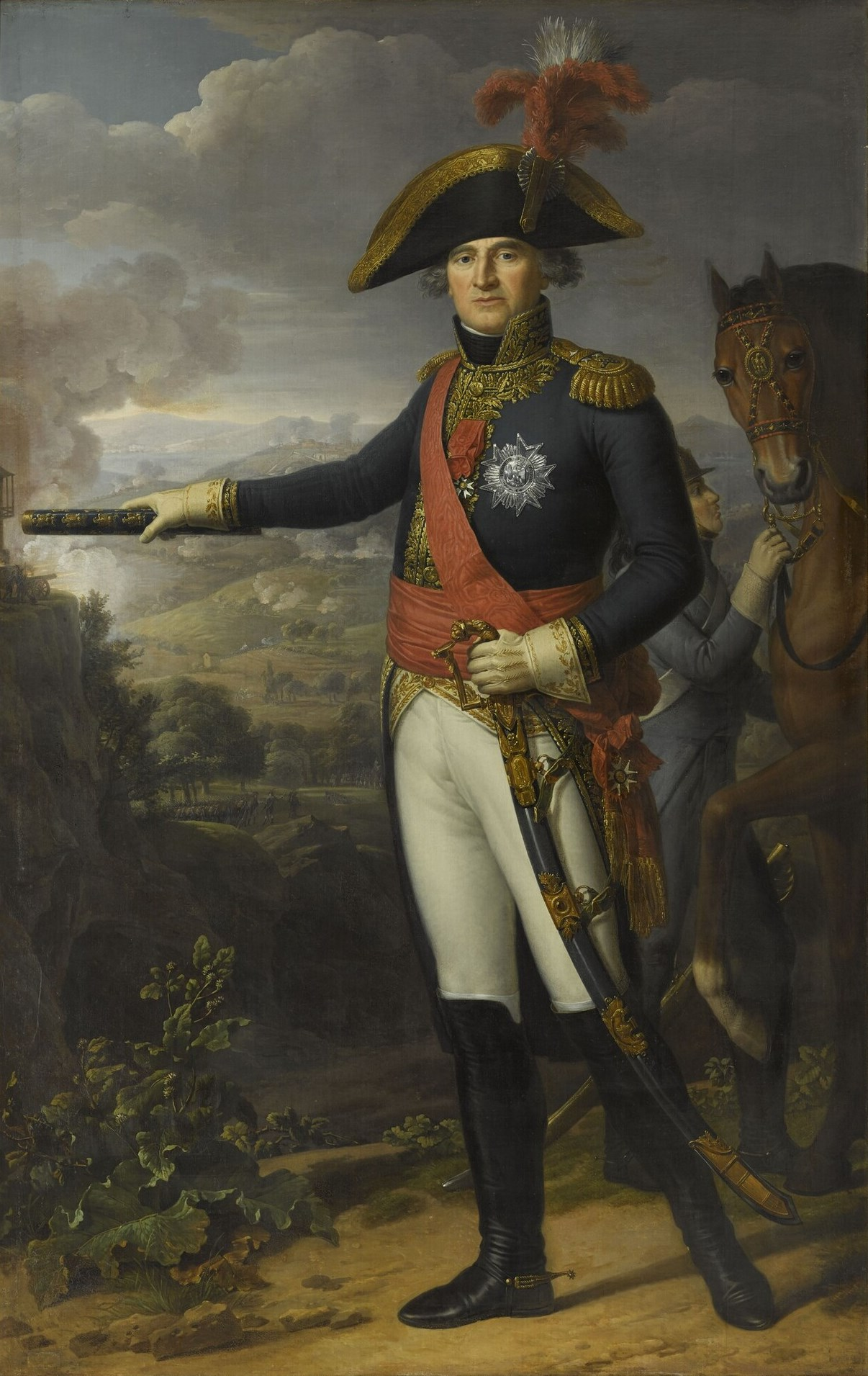
General Jean Mathieu Philibert Sérurier. A veteran already at the time of the first revolutionary upheavals, he was seriously considering retirement shortly before Bonaparte's arrival. The arrival of the new commander rekindled his enthusiasm, prompting him to remain in the army and complete the campaign.

In February 1793 the Army of the Var, commanded by General Armand-Louis de Gontaut-Biron, began its offensive toward the Col de Braus, near Sospel, supporting the central advance of his colleague Brunet. These movements were successful, allowing the French to capture Sospel in April and threaten Lantosque. When Biron was transferred to command the Army of the Vendée, overall command reverted to Brunet, who was nonetheless placed under Kellermann, commander-in-chief of the Army of the Alps. Kellermann's intention was to attack the Authion massif, where the Piedmontese under the Count of Sant’Andrea and General Colli-Marchini were entrenched, in an attempt to outflank the fortress of Saorgio.

A first battle started on 8 June, started with French gaining the upper hand and the Austro-Piedmontese retreat. Owing to hasty preparations, however, the republican forces failed to secure a decisive victory and halted their advance. Not being satisfied with the outcome, the commissioners sent to the front—including the future member of the Directory Barras—forced Brunet to seek battle again, even at the cost of fighting amid rain and lightning. The French made near-desperate attempts to storm the fortified Piedmontese positions on the Authion to satisfy the political commissioners, but failed and were repulsed along the entire line. During the battle, the émigré free corps led by Dominique-Fidèle de Bonneaude distinguished itself for its vigour. A few days later, amid fears of a Spanish landing at Villefranche-sur-Mer, Brunet's forces withdrew toward Nice, allowing their opponents to reoccupy their former positions.

=== The Toulon uprising ===
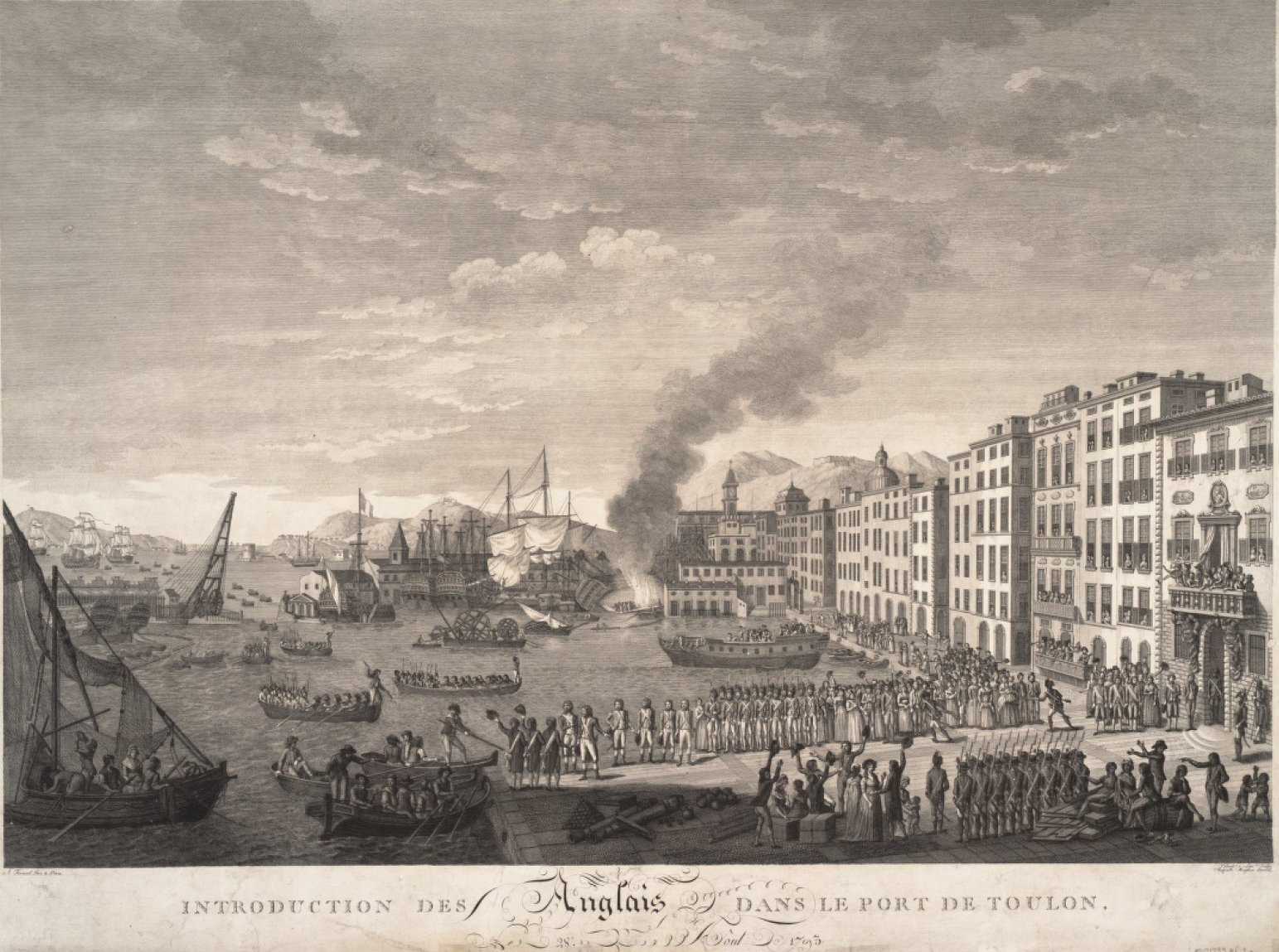
Anglo-Spanish fleet at Toulon in 1793.

Emboldened by the Piedmontese success at Authion, the British—after also signing a treaty of military cooperation with the Kingdom of Naples—decided to go on the offensive by supporting the counter-revolution led by Rear Admiral Jean-Honoré de Trogoff de Kerlessy (1751–1794) and endorsed by the French Baron Thomas Lebret d'Imbert in Toulon. On 28 July the British fleet under Samuel Hood entered the French naval harbour, simultaneously requesting reinforcements from the courts of Turin, Naples, and Vienna. Austria flatly refused, while both Naples and Piedmont sent troops. Victor Amadeus, determined to cooperate with the British to continue the advance in the Nice region, dispatched the young Ignazio Thaon di Revel with about 2,500 men, while Ferdinand IV of Naples sent around 65,000 troops under Prince Fabrizio Pignatelli di Cerchiara (1747–1796). The subsequent arrival of Spanish forces commanded by Juan de Lángara y Huarte and Federico Carlo Gravina de Montevago initially raised hopes for success. Revel soon realised, however, that the British were little interested in furthering the expansionist ambitions of the Piedmontese monarch. Relations between the British and the Spanish—among whose forces were also Irish mercenary brigades—were tense, if not openly hostile. The autumn opened disastrously for the allies: the Piedmontese counteroffensive on the Var, led by the Duke of Aosta, failed miserably, as will be seen, and the federalist uprising in Lyon, in some measure supported by royalists, was bloodily suppressed. The appearance of a young artillery officer, Napoleon Bonaparte, delivered the coup de grâce to the allied venture at Toulon. After presenting an alternative plan to that judged too daring by the aged chief engineer General Jean-Claude Le Michaud d’Arçon (1733–1800), it was decided that the capture of “Little Gibraltar” was vital to force the British re-embarkation and withdrawal. After repelling an allied sortie led by the British general Charles O'Hara, who was captured by the French, the attack was launched in mid-December. Masséna, Dugommier, and Bonaparte led the general offensive, which ended within three days and resulted in the allied defeat and evacuation of Toulon.

=== Savoy campaign ===
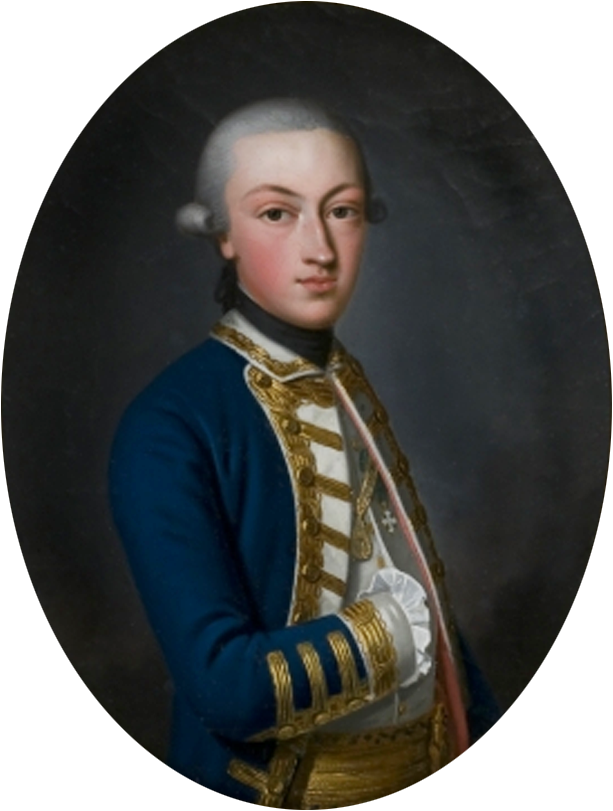
Portrait of Maurizio Giuseppe, Duke of Montferrat (1762–1799), preserved at the Venaria Reale. The duke commanded the ill-fated Savoyard offensive in the autumn of 1793.

While Lyon rose against the National Convention (9 August) and the British fleet entered Toulon (28 July), the Savoyard army—buoyed by the enthusiasm generated by the victory at Authion (12 June)—moved to reconquer Savoy and potentially advance into the Dauphiné. Supreme command was entrusted to the Duke of Montferrat, stationed together with Argenteau in Tarentaise. Two further divisions were deployed: one in Maurienne, led by the de la Tour brothers, and a smaller reserve commanded by the septuagenarian General Baron Pio Chino (1722–1794), positioned at the Mont Cenis.

The French, having less soldiers because Kellermann had been forced to send part of his Army of the Alps] to suppress the Lyon uprising and assist operations at Toulon, were deployed as follows: General Charles-Philippe Badelaune held Tarentaise with the bulk of the forces, while General Jean-Denis Le Doyen (1751–1802) occupied Maurienne. By mid-August the Savoyard offensive cautiously began, having already been partially initiated in late July by movements of the Marquis of Cordon against Le Doyen. The Duke of Montferrat advanced on Moûtiers and, assisted by the capable Baron Joseph-Amédée de la Tour, entered the town triumphantly on 22 August. Victor-Amédée de la Tour, however, advanced even more slowly, citing scant or nearly absent orders from Turin from General De Vins. On 18 August the Piedmontese entered Modane and then Saint-Jean-de-Maurienne, allowing Le Doyen to withdraw unmolested.

The Duke of Montferrat counted on a general Savoyard uprising against the French, but it soon became clear that the deeper the advance, the stronger republican presence became. Nonetheless, he waited at Moûtiers for the Faucigny to rise, confident that the population would wage guerrilla warfare as had occurred in the Nice region. When news arrived that a Piedmontese officer had been lynched by revolutionaries in Annecy and that Kellermann had successfully crushed the federalist rebels in Lyon, the already weak Austro-Sardinian offensive lost further momentum. The failure to capture Conflans also strengthened French prospects. Between 15 and 22 September, French forces regained the initiative, abandoning their defensive posture. Just as the French offensive was to begin, an arrest warrant for Kellermann arrived from Paris, accusing him of excessive moderation toward the insurgent citizens of Lyon. Although Kellermann was sent to the capital, Generals Le Doyen, Badelaune, Antoine Joseph Santerre, and Henri-Alexandre de Sarret (1767–1794) commenced offensive operations following Kellermann's plans. While Santerre was repulsed in Faucigny, Sarret and Le Doyen forced the retreat of the Marquis of Cordon's brigades from Chablais and Maurienne. Meanwhile, Badelaune advanced vigorously from Conflans against Argenteau. After driving back the Savoyard vanguards, Badelaune turned against the main division of the Duke of Montferrat, who decided to evacuate Moûtiers, triumphantly retaken by the French on 2 October. Within a few days the Piedmontese offensive collapsed and the Sardinian army returned to its starting positions.

=== Piedmontese movements in the Nice region ===
While the Duke of Montferrat prepared the Savoy offensive, expectations were equally high on the Nice front, where a major victory had been won in June. Victor Amadeus was so confident of success that on 21 August he departed for the Col de Tende together with De Vins and his two younger sons, Charles Felix, Duke of Genevois and Giuseppe Placido, Count of Maurienne. The attack plan had been devised by De Vins, but the Duke of Aosta, hostile to Austrian interference and eager to secure a major victory to satisfy both his wife and his own desire for revanche against the Austrians, produced a personal alternative plan.

De Vins's plan essentially called for a massive assault led by the Count of Sant’Andrea against Lantosque, supported by the Duke of Aosta, who was to join the allied army on the right bank of the Vésubie River. He was also to maintain contact with Strassoldo by dispatching a detachment to Saint-Dalmas-le-Selvage. General Colli was to conduct a diversion on the left bank of the Vésubie. Though sound on paper, the plan was difficult to execute due to Strassoldo's distance and the Duke of Aosta's advance along rugged mountain paths. Victor Emmanuel's excessive personal ambition further delayed the already complex offensive.

On 4 September the Savoyard prince communicated his personal plan to De Vins, who replied the following day insisting that the agreed plan be strictly followed. When the Count of Sant’Andrea launched the attack, he awaited the Duke of Aosta's reinforcements, which never arrived. Victor Emmanuel had taken the wrong route and reached the position only on 8 September via a steep mountain path. From there Revel could not see the Duke of Aosta, who encountered French-held redoubts. Unable to sustain the attack alone, De Vins ordered Revel to withdraw, but he disobeyed, confident of the duke's arrival. Victor Emmanuel, unable to continue a prolonged assault along mountain trails, withdrew toward Venanson. The French nonetheless abandoned Lantosque to entrench farther back, leaving it to the Savoyards.

Dissatisfied with the failure, the king returned to Demonte, while De Vins decided to assume direct control. When the offensive resumed on 15 October, the Austro-Piedmontese crossed the Var River but deployed too far apart. Despite being outnumbered, the French exploited this error and forced the allies to abandon the plain of Gilette within three days. On the 21st the Count of Sant’Andrea attempted an attack on Utelle but was repulsed by Dugommier's troops. After yet another failure, De Vins was compelled to retreat at the end of November, though a final attempt by the Duke of Aosta's division is recorded.

The French, however, were also experiencing a delicate political period, and Robespierre's regime did not overlook failures among officers on the Italian front. General Brunet, like Biron before him, was summoned to Paris and guillotined for high treason as punishment for the poor performance of his army at the First Battle of Saorgio and at Authion. Brunet was replaced in April by General Pierre-Jadart Dumerbion (1737–1797). In reality, power lay firmly in the hands of Antoine Saliceti, Augustin Robespierre, and Jean-François Ricord (1759–1818), the triumvirate of representatives-on-mission overseeing the conduct of the war.

=== Campaign in 1794 ===
On 6 January the Royal Council of War rejected the proposal advanced by the Secretary of State for Internal Affairs Giuseppe Graneri to side with France and, despite the strong objections put forward by the Duke of Aosta and the Duke of Chiablese, decided to split the Army into two Higher Commands, each composed of two divisions: the first command, that of the Western Alps, was to be Piedmontese and led by Victor Emmanuel, while the second, a mixed Austro-Piedmontese command, was to be led directly by De Vins.

From a military standpoint, these changes sidelined many of the protagonists of the previous year, who left active command. The Marquis of Cordon and the Count of Sant’Andrea retired from active command. The Prince of Carignano, Charles Emmanuel of Savoy, as mentioned above, replaced General Strassoldo, who was placed on retirement.

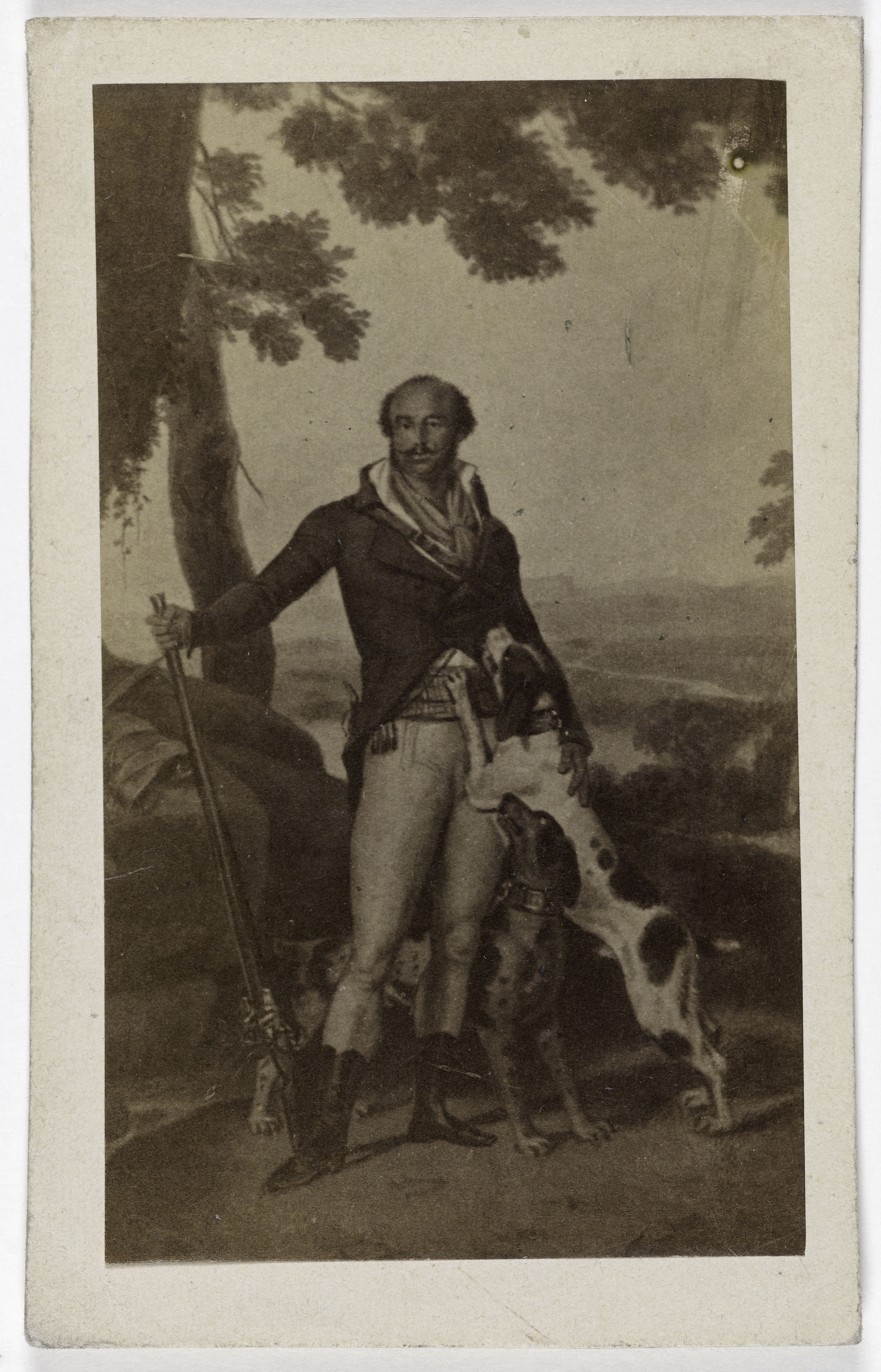
Portrait of General Dumas, later nicknamed the “Black Devil” because of the color of his skin.

On the French side, command of the Army of the Alps passed to General Alexandre Dumas, while that of the Army of the Var passed to General Dumerbion. Overseeing both generals were the government commissioners Saliceti, Robespierre and Ricord, now joined by the Italian Filippo Buonarroti In addition, Lazare Carnot, military head of the Committee of Public Safety, increased French manpower through the levée en masse, promoting the integration of new recruits with veterans.

The objective of the Army of the Var and the Army of the Alps was to penetrate into Piedmont and force it to capitulate, thereby opening the way to the rest of northern Italy. Once the Kingdom of Sardinia had fallen, it was believed, the remaining Italian states would not represent a serious threat to France. Carnot also devised three axes of attack to undermine the Austro-Sardinian defense: to threaten Turin and Aosta, the Mont Cenis and the Little St Bernard Pass were to be seized; meanwhile, an offensive was to be launched against Saorgio and Tenda to advance on Cuneo, supported by control of the Sardinian Principality of Oneglia and the passes toward Ceva and thus Ormea–Nava Pass and Garessio–San Bernardo Pass. Operations in the Ligurian Alps would, however, have required crossing the territory of the Republic of Genoa, which had thus far remained neutral and inviolate. For this reason, the Committee of Public Safety approved the plan but excluded military transit through Genoese territory and instead authorized a seaborne attack on Oneglia, considered vital to the success of the project.

=== Ligurian and Aosta theatres ===
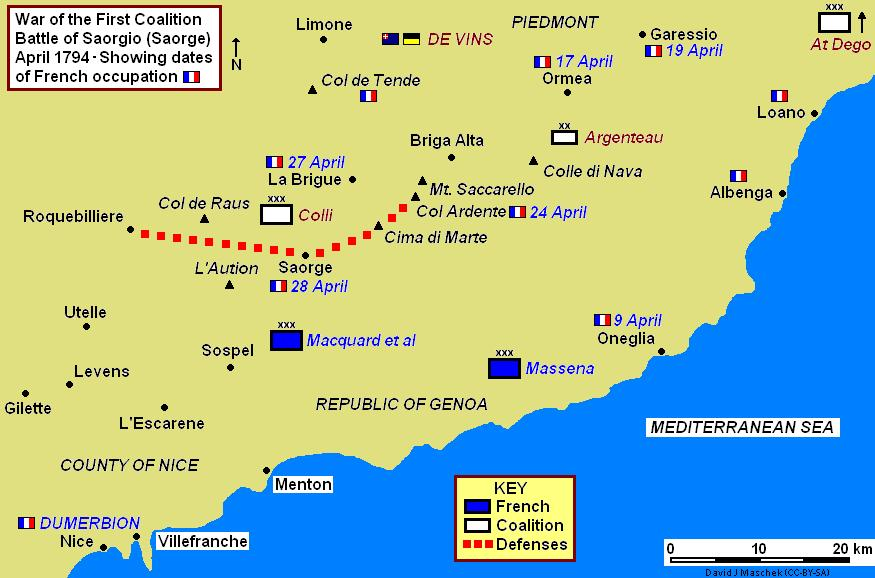
Map of the operations around Saorgio in 1794.

Dumerbion placed particular confidence in three rising generals who had distinguished themselves in the previous year: Sérurier, Masséna and the very young Bonaparte. Bonaparte, in particular, played a decisive role in the elaboration of the war plans that led to the fall of Saorgio and the French advance toward the Republic of Genoa. Having visited the area in 1792 under Anselme and having studied the French campaigns of 1744–1745, Bonaparte realized that Milleforche, Authion and Raus would never fall to a frontal assault and that Saorgio was therefore unassailable by direct attack. By abandoning a frontal assault and instead executing a maneuver, however, it was possible to force the Austro-Piedmontese to abandon the heights and Saorgio itself: their positions had to be outflanked on the left via the Roia, the Argentina (torrent) and the Nervia valleys, seizing the mountains on that side. This would sever communications with the fortress of Saorgio; once the fortress fell, the surrounding positions would soon be abandoned, allowing the Republican forces to advance rapidly toward the Tenda Pass, block access to the County of Nice and open the road to Cuneo. The only obstacle was the diplomatic position of the Republic of Genoa, whose consent was required for French passage.

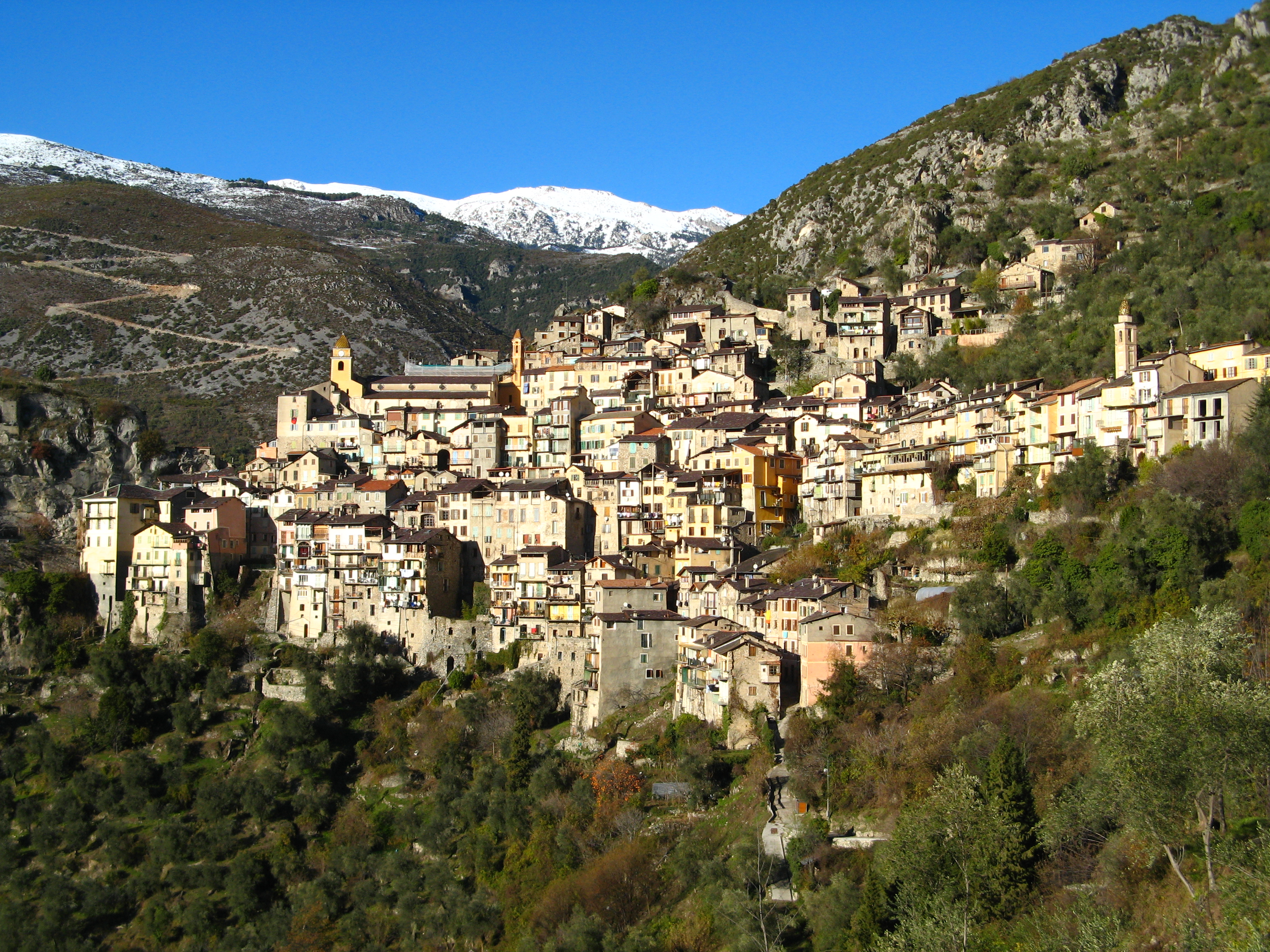
View of Saorgio.

Meanwhile, the French began their offensive, on 5 April Masséna, together with Bonaparte, crossed the border of the Republic of Genoa at Ventimiglia, continuing to violate Genoese territory along the western Ligurian coast as far as Taggia. From there he prepared two bridgeheads, one toward Oneglia and the other toward the Colle Ardente, from which it was possible to descend toward Briga Marittima. Slightly farther north, two other French divisions advanced toward Saorgio. While the attack on Saorgio was initially repelled due to heavy snowfall, the attack on Oneglia succeeded perfectly, also owing to the failure of Austrian intervention by Argenteau: General Costa della Trinità, defender of the Principality of Oneglia, evacuated toward the Austrian positions at the Nava Pass, allowing the French to enter Oneglia on 10 April. On Bonaparte's advice, General André Mouret (1745–1818) also moved to occupy Albenga and Loano.

The general Colli organized a defensive line from Briga to Breglio, passing through Saorgio, and from there sent a detachment to the Colle Ardente, one of the objectives of the French divisions dispatched by Masséna. Alarmed by French success along the Ligurian coast, the king decided to send the Marquis of Albarey to Belgium to press for a formal defensive agreement with the emperor. Meanwhile, French movements continued: on 16 April Masséna and Mouret attacked Argenteau's positions; he not only evacuated Ormea and the San Bernardo Pass, retreating to Ceva, but also unjustly accused Colli of having abandoned him. On the 27th the first French attacks on Briga began: attacked from the left by three columns led respectively by Claude d'Allemagne (1754–1813), Jacques Desjardin (1759–1807) and Joseph-David de Barquier (1757–1844), and from the right by General Nicolas Brûlé (1758–1794), Colli resisted, but on the morning of the 28th Masséna unleashed the full weight of French firepower and forced the Piedmontese to abandon Briga, albeit at the cost of heavy losses. Shortly afterward, the fortress of Saorgio, on Colli's own orders, surrendered to the French. Hostilities on the Alpine front began on 24 March, mainly to divert Sardinian forces from the southern front. The Sardinian positions stretched along the Alps from the Cottian to the Graian ranges, from Monviso to Mont Blanc. The first attack was launched by the French general Sarret against Mont Cenis, defended by the octogenarian General Chino; the assault was repelled and Sarret was killed. Since the Piedmontese positions were well defended, Dumas decided to attack via the Aosta Valley, exploiting the absence of the Duke of Montferrat, who was in Turin. On 20 April the French, led by Generals Louis Alméras and Badelaune, advanced toward the Little St Bernard Pass and, aided by the betrayal of a Bernese officer, captured the Monte Vallesano on the 23rd. The Piedmontese were forced to abandon the pass. On 25 April the Duke of Montferrat arrived in Aosta and ordered a withdrawal to Saint-Pierre and later to the Castle of Quart, also evacuating the Fort of Bard. Dumas, however, did not intend to descend the Dora Baltea toward Ivrea, but aimed instead to outflank Mont Cenis further south, enabling a French penetration into the Susa Valley. On 7 May the second phase of the attack began. Three French columns advanced from the Dauphiné into the Varaita and Susa valleys: one quickly captured Chianale after crossing the Agnel Pass, another was stopped at Fort Bramafam before reaching Bardonecchia, while the third occupied Cesana and Oulx. The Fort of Exilles was thus surrounded on three sides and subjected to repeated siege operations by General Louis Joseph Marie Rogon de Carcaradec (1742–1802). At the same time Masséna moved south to seize the Tenda Pass. After the collapse of the left flank, the Piedmontese retreated toward Limone Piemonte and prepared their last defensive works at Borgo San Dalmazzo. On the western Alps, Dumas captured Mont Cenis within three days, forcing the Sardinian troops to withdraw southward under the guns of the Fort of Brunetta. General Chino resigned and was replaced by Marquis Carlo Vittorio Damiano di Salicetto.

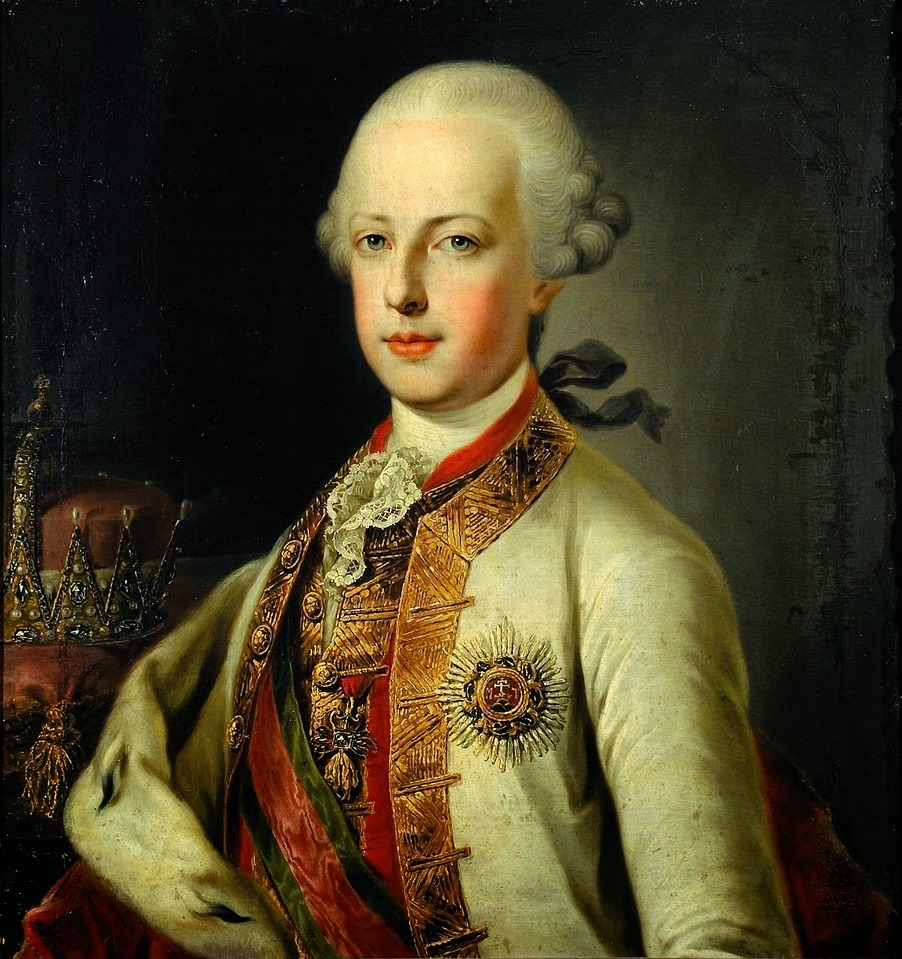
Archduke Ferdinand Karl of Austria-Este, last governor of the Duchy of Milan.

Meanwhile, Austrian policy increasingly viewed the Kingdom of Sardinia as expendable in order to safeguard Austrian possessions in Italy. Although Milan remained more optimistic, Vienna prepared to sacrifice Piedmont. After failed attempts to create an Italian league, Austria finally signed the controversial “military convention” with the Piedmontese envoy Albarey on 23 May, providing increased Austrian support but also placing part of the Sardinian forces under Austrian command. De Vins nonetheless remained commander-in-chief of Austrian forces in Italy, likely because his imminent retirement was anticipated.

=== The 1795 campaign ===
The year 1795 opened with important developments from both a military and a diplomatic point of view. First of all, the forces of the Army of the North under the command of General Jean-Charles Pichegru successfully entered the Netherlands, overthrowing the regime of the stadtholder and established a republic modeled on France. This victory allowed the French and their allies to shorten the front line to the Rhine River alone. In addition, over the following six months, three peace treaties removed Spain, Prussia, and the Tuscany from the war, with the side effect of strengthening relations between Austria and Great Britain, both determined to continue the war effort against the young French Republic. While the fighting on the Rhine ended inconclusively, the situation in Italy evolved more slowly.

On the Italian front there were about 45,000 French soldiers, about one third deployed between Savoy and the Alpine passes leading toward the Aosta Valley, while the remainder were employed on the Nice front, stretching from Saint-Étienne-de-Tinée toward Tenda and as far as Vado. The two armies operated on this front—the Army of the Alps and the Army of the Var—were merged into a new formation, the Army of Italy. Command was assigned to General Kellermann, whose chief of staff was Louis Alexandre Berthier. Allied forces also underwent some changes: the arrival of Neapolitan cavalry and the recruitment of several thousand Piedmontese volunteers gave the counter-revolutionary coalition a clear numerical advantage. De Vins, however, failed to exploit it.

The military campaign opened with the objective of seizing the Alpine passes in the Aosta Valley. The first attempt by General Moulin to take the Colle di Monte was carried out on 17 April, but the still-abundant snow undermined the success of the operation. About a month later, on 12 May, the French attacked the Alpine pass once again. The Sardinian forces attempted to counterattack, concentrating part of their efforts also on the Little St. Bernard Pass, but they were unable to dislodge the republicans from their positions. Sardinian attempts continued until early September, without producing any results. On the contrary, on 14 October the French succeeded in occupying the village of Novalesa on the Piedmontese side of the Alps.

In the Maritime Alps, by contrast, the front became very active in the second half of June. On the 23rd, General Wallis engaged the French near Savona, threatening the right flank of the French deployment. The city, strategically valuable because of its port, after witnessing the fighting at close range declared its neutrality, forcing both sides to cease hostilities over its control. The fighting moved the following day to the vicinity of Vado, which had been occupied by the troops of Laharpe. Wallis, at the head of 10,000 men, intended to drive Laharpe and his 2,000 soldiers from the redoubt of Madonna del Monte: he attacked in three columns but was repulsed with heavy losses, narrowly escaping with his life. After these initial engagements, a more determined attack took place at Melogno.

=== 1796: Bonaparte takes command ===
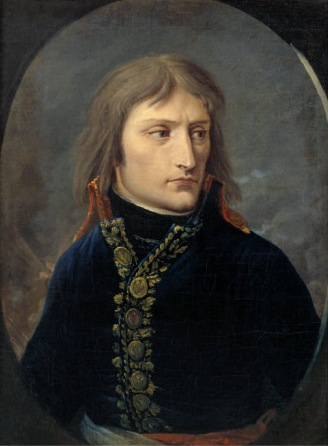
Bonaparte during the First Italian Campaign.

The 1795 ended without major events on the Italian front, with the exception of the Battle of Loano, which allowed French troops to penetrate into the territory of present-day Liguria but produced no immediate follow-up, partly because of the dire condition of the Army of Italy, and partly because of the cautious attitude of General Schérer. During the following winter, the commander of the French army, weary of receiving instructions from the Directory on how to conduct the campaign, tendered his resignation. The Directory accepted Schérer's resignation in March 1796 and sent in his place a young Corsican general experiencing his first command of an army. At least initially, Napoleon Bonaparte's appointment appeared more political than military in nature, particularly as a reward for having suppressed the royalist uprising in Paris. Many veteran soldiers, however, remembered well the period of the siege of Toulon and retained a positive memory of the artillery officer who had brought victory to the revolutionaries. Moreover, Bonaparte had served as inspector of artillery with the Army of Italy in 1794, and the capture of Saorgio had largely been achieved thanks to a plan of his own devising.

Bonaparte's energy and charisma proved indispensable to the success of his campaign: he moved the French headquarters from Nice to Savona and immediately began gathering all possible information on the deployment of his own troops and those of the enemy. Within a month of his arrival, he had already formulated a plan of action to eliminate the Piedmontese from the conflict by employing the “central position strategy”: exploiting the geographical separation between the Piedmontese and Austrian armies, combined with their poor cooperation and mutual distrust, Bonaparte planned to attack the weakest point of the enemy deployment, identified in the town of Carcare, and then fight the two armies separately. In this way, instead of facing a single army of 60,000 men, he would have to confront two much smaller forces. Specifically, Napoleon intended to employ a strategy devised in 1745 by the Marshal of France Marquis Jean-Baptiste Desmarets de Maillebois, which relied on the capture of the stronghold of Ceva to remove the Piedmontese from the conflict: once the fortress was taken, the French army would march directly on Turin, forcing the Savoyard monarchist forces to surrender.

In any case, the condition of Bonaparte's army was miserable: soldiers' pay was months in arrears; disease spread throughout the units; desertions and mutinies were neither new nor isolated occurrences; rations were often insufficient or entirely absent. Furthermore, not only was the front considered secondary compared to the German one, but the Directory routinely siphoned off soldiers from the Army of Italy for redeployment further north. With his customary boundless energy, Napoleon began writing dozens upon dozens of letters to the Directory, requesting new shoes, ammunition, funds, and anything else that might be useful to his cause. He was partially accommodated, albeit with the usual delays that reflected the scant interest shown toward his army and the Italian front. Nevertheless, it was not so much the new resources received that brought success to the Army of Italy as Bonaparte's own spirit, as he worked tirelessly and relentlessly to restore his army's effectiveness. This did not go unnoticed, especially among the officers, and many began almost immediately to appreciate their new commander.

Bonaparte had planned to begin the campaign on 15 April. He positioned a brigade under General Cervoni at Voltri, not far from Genoa, to keep the port city under observation and monitor Beaulieu's Austrians. To the west, the three divisions commanded by his three most senior generals (Sérurier, Augereau and Masséna) were preparing to march on the Cadibona Pass and rapidly penetrate into Piedmont. These plans were upset when Beaulieu, convinced that Napoleon was aiming for Genoa, organized a sudden attack on Cervoni's isolated corps, which, after an initial resistance, was driven off. An Austrian division remained stationed in the city, while a brigade under Argenteau moved toward Cairo Montenotte. French scouts identified Argenteau's corps and reported its presence to the French commander: Napoleon, who had carefully studied all the maps of the area, was well aware that no other Austrian unit could reach Argenteau's brigade in short order and decided to attack it immediately, advancing the entire military operation from 15 April to the 12th.

The three French divisions under Augereau, Sérurier and Masséna moved toward Cairo Montenotte, where the day before Argenteau had attempted to seize the redoubt of Monte Negino, stubbornly defended by Colonel Antoine-Guillaume Rampon (1759–1842) and his men. Argenteau failed to realize the danger facing his forces until it was too late: he found himself almost surrounded by the French, who attacked him from three separate directions and nearly annihilated his troops. Austrian losses were heavy, with over 2,500 killed, wounded, or captured. French losses did not reach one thousand. Napoleon's first battle could thus be considered a success: an entire Austrian detachment had been shattered, and troop morale soared following the victory, the first of a long series.

The following weeks were marked by a frenzied advance by the Republicans, who, following their commander's strategy, sought to drive back and completely crush the Piedmontese before turning their attention to the Austrians, who had just learned of the debacle at Montenotte. Augereau's corps was the first to reach the Cadibona Pass, while the other divisions attacked the villages of Millesimo and Dego, which hosted numerous units of the coalition armies. Although the results were excellent from a military standpoint, haste and poor discipline proved to be the French army's enemies: at Dego, Masséna's men gave themselves over to looting and were taken by surprise by a group of Austrians, losing control of the town for several hours. Meanwhile, Augereau's division, after defeating the Austro-Piedmontese, launched an assault on the Cosseria Castle, a position exceptionally well defended by coalition forces. Losses at Cosseria were substantial—almost 1,500 dead and wounded—and would have been far greater had the defenders not run out of ammunition and surrendered after just one day.

With the Austrians driven away from Dego, Bonaparte concentrated his forces on the fortress of Ceva, following precisely the strategy he had devised. On 16 April Bonaparte sent Augereau's division to attack the fortress from the center, Masséna from the left, and Sérurier from the right: the assaults were numerous and bloody, especially for the Republicans, but by the end of the day the stronghold and the nearby redoubts remained in monarchist hands. During the night, the Piedmontese commander abandoned the fortress and withdrew behind the Corsaglia. The French expelled the weak remaining garrison, and on 18 April made the fortress their new headquarters. Once again, the French followed the Piedmontese in their retreat and attacked them near Mondovì: Colli-Marchini, who merely sought to gain time for withdrawal, failed to halt the Republican forces and was defeated yet again. Despite the commendable conduct of the Piedmontese army, which had always managed to remain cohesive, the overwhelming strength of the French had been sufficient to penetrate into the heart of the Kingdom of Sardinia, and it appeared extremely difficult to stop their advance toward the capital.

== Aftermath ==
Napoleon Bonaparte launched new offensive in Beaulieu and managed to defeat the Austrians in Fombio and Lodi in May. On 15 May 1796 a Paris peace treaty was signed in under harsh conditions for the House of Savoy. The Sardinian army was reduced to only 10,000 men, Piedmont was demilitarized, the navy was requisitioned, Piedmontese fortresses were destroyed, and France became its mandatory principal trading partner. On 21 May, Bonaparte entered Milan. Bonaparte then advanced eastward again, pushing the Austrians in the Battle of Borghetto, and began the siege of Mantua in June. On 23 June, a ceasefire was signed between the Papal States and France. Meanwhile, the army of Dagobert von Wurmser campaigned toward Mantua but retreated northward into the foothills of the Tyrol in August after several defeats, including the Battle of Castiglione.

In September, Bonaparte marched north toward Trento in the Tyrol, but Wurmser returned toward Mantua through the valley of the Brenta, leaving the forces of Paul Davidovich to contain the French. Bonaparte overwhelmed the holding force at the Rovereto. He then followed Wurmser into the Brenta valley, fell upon the Austrians, and defeated them at the Battle of Bassano on 8 September. Bonaparte occupied the Duchy of Modena and Reggio, established a military base at Genoa, intimidated Venice through military demonstrations, and concluded a treaty isolating the pope on 10 October. Wurmser chose to march on Mantua with a large part of his surviving troops. The Austrians sent another army under the command of Josef Alvinczy against Bonaparte in November. Once again, the Austrians divided their efforts, sending Davidovich's corps through the north while Alvinczy's main body attacked from the east. They initially defeated the French at Bassano, Calliano, and Caldiero However, Bonaparte managed to ultimately defeated Alvinczy at the Battle of the Bridge of Arcole, southeast of Verona. After Davidovich's defeat, Alvinczy finally retreated into the Brenta valley. At the end of November, the French government decided to negotiate peace with the Austrians, but Austrian demands caused the French to change their position. In Italy, Napoleon's armies besieged Mantua at the beginning of the year, and a second attempt by Alvinczy's Austrians to relieve the siege was repulsed at the Battle of Rivoli, where the French achieved a decisive victory. Finally, on 2 February, Wurmser capitulated at Mantua. Papal forces requested peace, which was granted at Tolentino on 19 February. Napoleon was now free to attack the heart of Austria. He advanced directly toward Austria through the Julian Alps, sending Barthélemy Joubert to invade the Tyrol. Charles of Austria hastily left the German front to defend Austria, but he was defeated at the Battle of Valvasone on 16 March, and Napoleon entered Austria, occupying Klagenfurt and preparing to rendezvous with Joubert before Vienna. Napoleon's victories alarmed the Austrians and pushed them to seek peace, which they concluded at the Treaty of Leoben in April, ending hostilities. However, his absence from Italy allowed the outbreak of the revolt known as the Veronese Easter on 17 April, which was suppressed eight days later. On 17 October, France and Austria partitioned the Republic of Venice under the Treaty of Campo Formio, ending the War of the First Coalition.
