= Gaspard Eberlé =

French general (1761–1837)

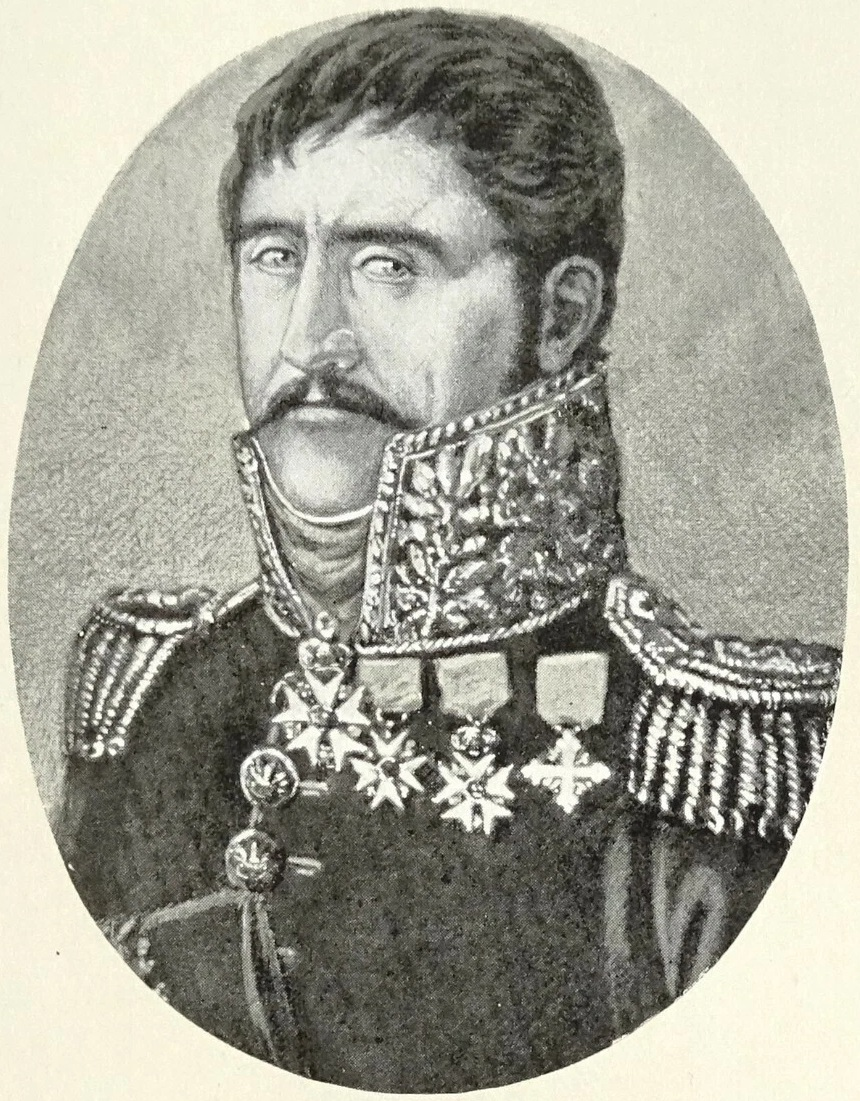
- Born: 11 June 1764; Sélestat, France
- Died: 16 February 1837 (aged 72); Nice, Kingdom of Sardinia (now France)
- Burial place: Cimetière du Château, Nice
- Military career
- Allegiance: France
- Branch: Infantry
- Service years: 1781–1816
- Rank: General de brigade
- Conflicts: French Revolutionary Wars; Napoleonic Wars
- Awards: Sabre of honour Commander of the Legion of Honour; Knight of the Empire; Knight of Saint Louis; Order of Saints Maurice and Lazarus

Gaspard Eberlé or Éberlé, (11 June 1764 – 16 February 1837) was a French general and military governor. The son of a soldier from Alsace, he joined the army in the last years of the Ancien régime and served with distinction in the French Revolutionary Wars. A string of gallant actions in Spain, Egypt and particularly Italy earned him a Sabre of honour and a rank equivalent to colonel. His career was halted when his right arm was amputated following the battle of Pozzolo. Promoted to General, he spent twelve years as governor of Nice, a city to which he returned during his retirement. He died there in 1837.

== Origins and early career ==
Gaspard Eberlé was born in Sélestat, Bas-Rhin on 11 June 1764, the son of François Joseph Eberlé and Catherine Golinger. His father, a former tailor from Haguenau, was a soldier in the Waldner regiment, a Swiss regiment in French service. Growing up as a "child of the regiment," Eberlé himself enlisted in the Maine regiment on 25 September 1781 under the nom de guerre "Gaspard."

The regiment had a series of postings in the south of France: Béziers in 1781, Toulon in 1782 and Montpellier in 1783. In April 1784, the regiment sailed to Saint-Florent on Corsica, Eberlé was promoted to corporal there on 1 May 1787. The regiment was still on the island when the French Revolution broke out, returning to the mainland in 1791 and eventually posted in Monaco.

== Active service ==
In 1792, Corporal Gaspard got his first taste of action as part of the capture of Nice under General d'Anselme. He rose through the ranks that year, being promoted to sergeant on 16 March, and to sergeant major on 9 November.

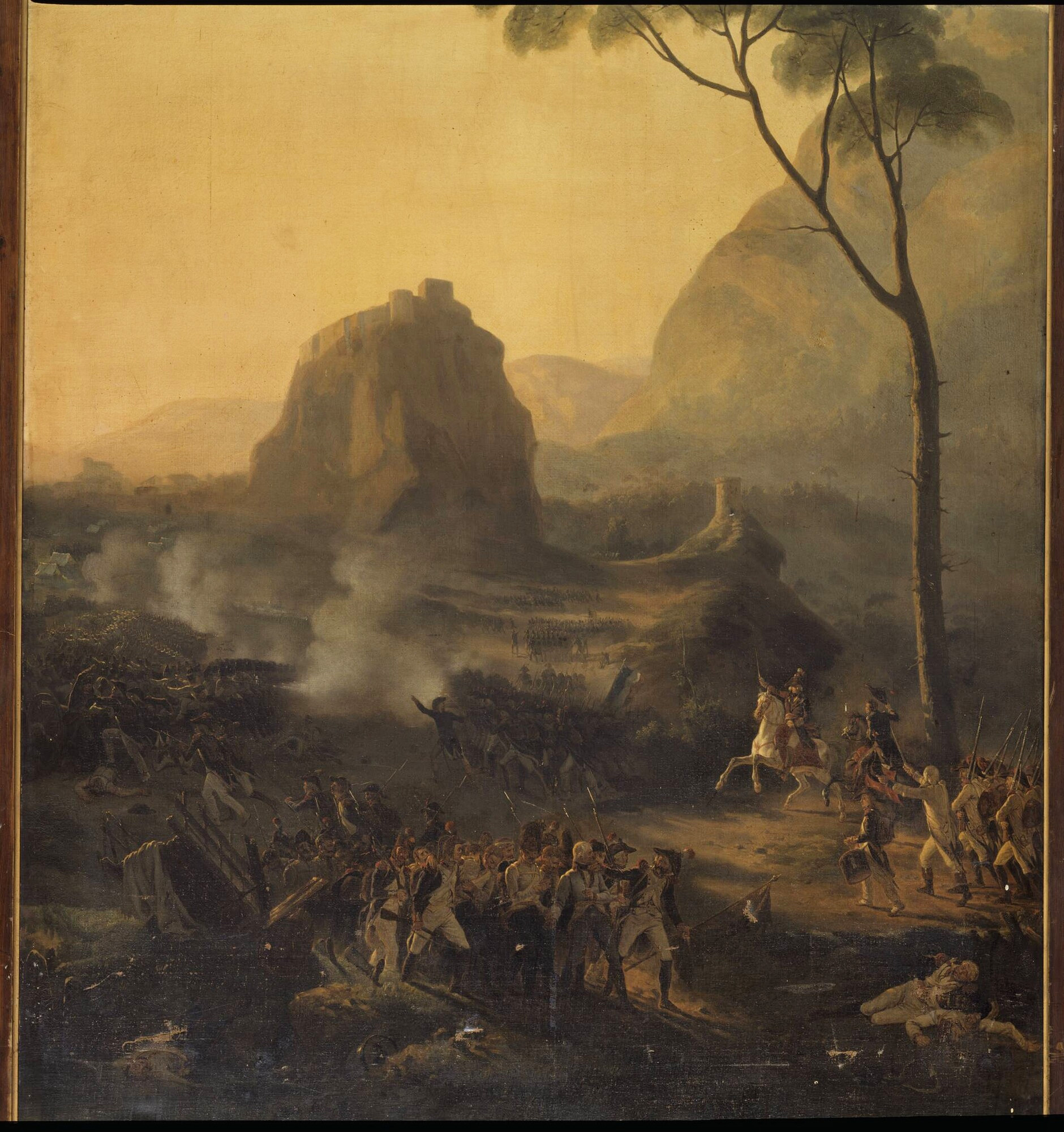
Combat de Gillette, 19 octobre 1793, by Jean Alphonse Roehn. Eberlé is depicted in the left foreground.

The following year, Eberlé's regiment transferred to the Army of Italy. On 19 October, he was part of a party of 70 men sent to reconnoitre a position near Gilette held by 4000 Croats. When its officers were killed, sergeant major Gaspard took command of the French force. Donning the uniform of a dead Austrian major, he found his way into the enemy bastion and ordered the Croats to surrender (as a native of Alsace, he was able to speak German). The ruse succeeded, and the position was taken. General Dugommier rewarded him with promotion to the rank of adjudant général chef de battalion, thus entrusting him with the rank of the Austrian officer he had replaced. In 1835, Louis Philippe would commission a painting of this action to hang in the Galerie des Batailles in the Palace of Versailles.

Further promotion came at the siege of Toulon, where Representatives of the People Barras, Ricord, Fréron and Saliceti appointed Eberlé adjudant général chef de brigade (equivalent to a colonel) on 21 November 1793. On 15 December he led the vanguard in the assault on the "English redoubt," contributing powerfully to the success of the operation.

Transferring to the Army of the Eastern Pyrenees in 1794, Eberlé served at the sieges of Collioure and Port-Vendres. On 3 May, with five companies of chasseurs and one of grenadiers, he successfully defended one of the batteries directed at Fort Saint-Elme from a strong sortie. At the assault on the fort 15 days later, he helped place the ladders, seized the gate to attach a petard to it, and was wounded by a bullet that went through his right knee. He was wounded again on 26 October, this time shot in the right shoulder, whilst charging Spanish cavalry on the road to Figueres. On 20 November, during the siege of Roses, he led a successful bayonet assault on the Nostra-Signora del Roure redoubt and captured the bridge of the mills.

The following year, Eberlé returned to the Army of Italy, commanding the vanguard of Masséna's division. On 16 October 1795, he seized the redoubt and camp of Rocca Barbena at the head of a company of scouts, taking 400 prisoners. He captured several redoubts and 2000 prisoners at the battle of Loano on 23 November, pursuing the enemy on the next day. In 1796 he was given command of the vanguard of Sérurier's division and fought at the battle of Mondovì where he was hit by three shots, one of which went through his right leg, but continued to lead his troops. On 21 November he fought in the recapture of Rivoli following the battle of Arcole. In the spring of 1797, he took part in General Joubert's Tyrolean expedition.

Along with most of the Army of Italy, Eberlé's unit was chosen to take part in the invasion of Egypt. Sailing from Toulon on 19 May 1798, he landed in Malta on 18 June and took part in the occupation of Gozo. He later fought at the battle of the Pyramids, but fell ill and had to be repatriated to France. Adverse winds caused the ship carrying him and 22 other convalescents to put in to Crotone in Calabria, where they were forced to take refuge in the citadel from local insurgents. Eberlé took command of the crew and passengers, and put up such a resistance that he was able to secure an honourable capitulation and passage home for himself and his companions.

On 16 November 1800, Eberlé once more found himself in the Army of Italy, this time as part of General Delmas' division. In that formation he fought at the crossing of the Mincio during the battle of Pozzolo, where his right arm was shredded by shrapnel and had to be amputated on the field of battle. This wound marked the end of his career as a battlefield leader.

Eberlé was granted indefinite convalescent leave following the loss of his arm. On 15 June 1801 he was awarded a sabre of honour by First Consul Bonaparte, the citation listing fourteen engagements between 1792 and 1800 in which he had distinguished himself. The following year, on 3 April, he was promoted to général de brigade and appointed Commandant of Nice.

== Garrison commander ==
Eberlé built a house on land he leased near the remains of the castle of Nice, where he installed his wife and children, grew flowers and vegetables in the gardens, and looked out across the city and surrounding countryside. On 15 June 1804 he was named a Commander of the Legion of Honour.

Arms of Gaspard Eberlé: Azure, a chief Or, charged with a chevron of one-third of the shield Gules, with the sign of the knights of the legion overall, accompanied in chief on Or by two Azure stars and in base on Azure by a right hand Argent, holding a saber Or.

On 6 January 1812, Eberlé was awarded an annuity of 4000 francs paid by the people of Rome. A project to reorganise local administrations left Eberlé concerned that, as a général de brigade, he would not be allowed to retain his post. He wrote to Minister of War Clarke begging that he be permitted to remain in post in the light of his long service and the importance of the place. The request was granted. On 1 January 1813 he was made a Knight of the Empire. He designed his own coat of arms, featuring the two stars of a général de brigade, the insignia of the legion, and his amputated right hand holding his sabre of honour.

In Russia and Germany the Empire was failing. When Eberlé heard of Napoleon's victory at Dresden, he ordered a Te Deum be sung in thanks in the cathedral. Days after the service was held, the battle of Leipzig marked the end of the Empire in Germany. The following year, Napoleon was forced to abdicate. Under the terms of abdication, signed on 12 April 1814, France returned to its borders of 1792. This meant returning the County of Nice to the Kingdom of Sardinia.

Whilst arranging the transfer, Eberlé also had to deal with French troops from Eugène's army that were withdrawing through the region. On the night of 14 to 15 May, violence broke out between these troops and a regiment of Croatian hussars who were to form the new garrison. Only firm action by Eberlé prevented things from getting out of hand, and the city getting burned and looted. On 20 May he withdrew to Antibes, taking 3 cannon and 6 caissons with him from Nice's stores.

Eberlé was placed on non-active status during the First Restoration, and made a Knight of Saint Louis on 1 November 1814. He rallied to Napoleon during the Hundred Days and was placed in command of Briançon and the department of Hautes-Alpes. Following the battle of Waterloo, Eberlé defended Briançon against a Austro-Sardinian army from 15 August to 15 November 1815, successfully preserving the town and the considerable stores it contained. He got no thanks from the new regime for these actions, and was sent into permanent retirement.

== Retirement ==
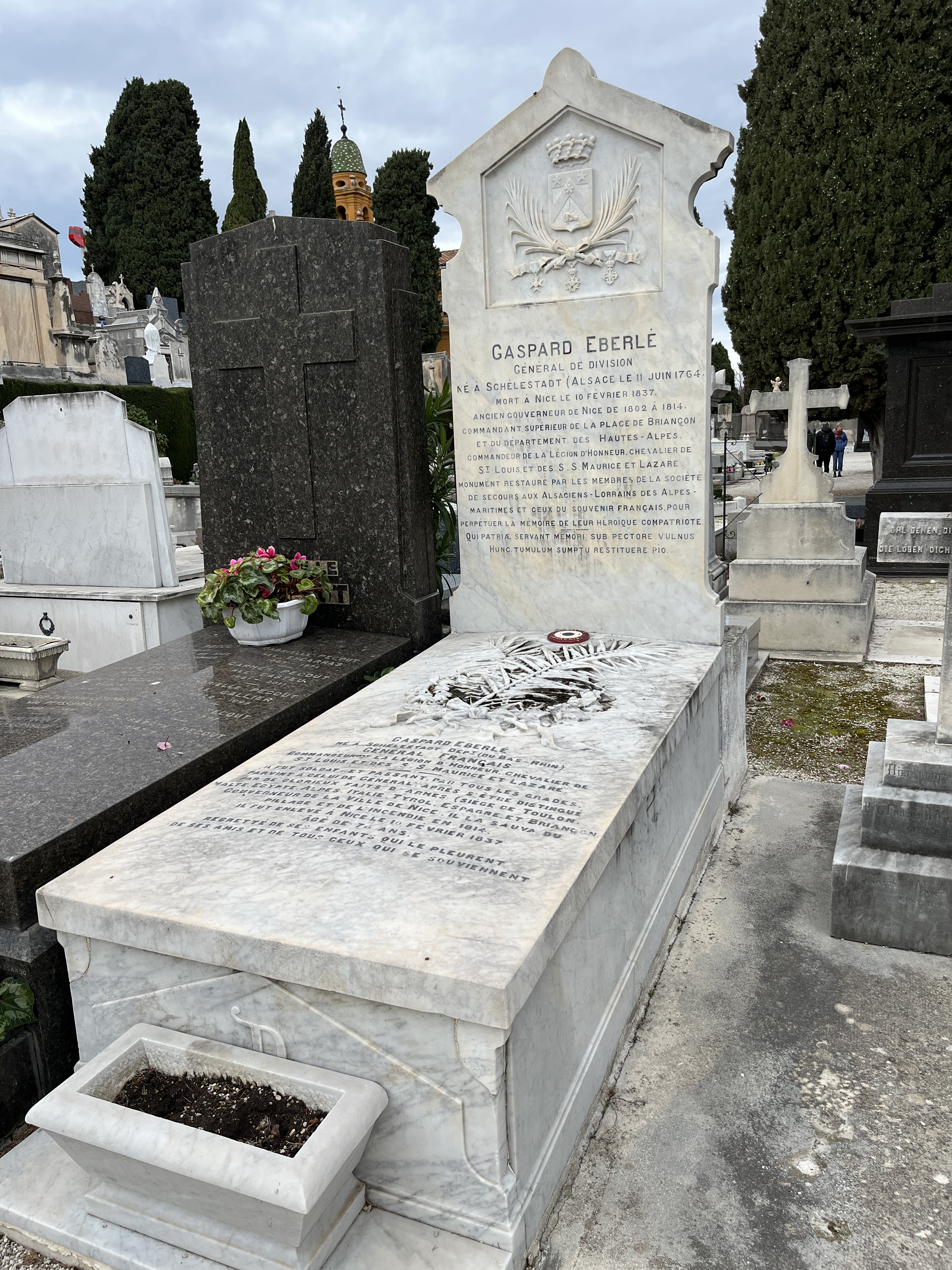
Tomb of General Gaspard Eberlé at the cimetière du Château in Nice

Eberlé returned to his home in Antibes, where he lived on a pension confirmed by the royal ordinance of 5 June 1816. The people of Nice prevailed upon King Charles Felix to allow him to return to their city, but his pension depended on his living in France. It was only after the intervention of Count Partouneaux with the Minister of War in 1824 that Eberlé was able to return to Nice, on the condition that his son serve in the hussars of the French Royal Guard.

The Niçois nicknamed him Lou General sensa bra, meaning "the General was truly great" but also a pun on "the General without an arm". Eberlé was presented with the cross of Saints Maurice and Lazarus by King Charles Albert in 1836. He died on 16 February 1837 (aged 72) and was buried the next day at the cimetière du Château.

== Family ==
Eberlé married twice, firstly to Benoîte Elisabeth Levé (c.1774–1804) with whom he had a daughter:

- Victoire-Benoite, born 25 February 1803, married her cousin M. Eberlé.

His second wife was Marie Julie Bermon (1787–1857), whom he married in Nice on 12 July 1814, legitimising their four children:

- Anne Marie Françoise, born 1 August 1806, married General Baron Davise.
- Alexandre Hyérome, born 31 January 1808, officer in the Piedmont-Sardinian army, died in Genoa on 2 April 1837.
- Victoire, born 12 March 1810, married M. Tessier.
- Joseph Gaspard, born 12 February 1813.
