= Capture of Nice =

- Part of the French Revolutionary Wars
Date	September 28, 1792
Location	Nice, County of Nice, Kingdom of Sardinia (now France)
Result	French victory

Belligerents
French Republic	Kingdom of Sardinia

Commanders and leaders
Jacques Bernard d'Anselme	Eugene-Philippe de Courten

Strength
7,500	-

The Capture of Nice occurred on September 28, 1792, during the French Revolutionary Wars between the First French Republic and Kingdom of Sardinia. Part of the Italian Campaign during the French Revolution, the French were led by General Jacques Bernard d'Anselme who was tasked to occupy the County of Nice. The county was captured without a fight.

== Background ==
During the French Revolution, the French had angered other monarchs and the power balance was no longer equal. Austria and the Holy Roman Empire began to place troops on the French border. France declared war on the two countries.

In late September the Kingdom of Sardinia joined the war against France. General de Montesquiou was a few miles north of Anselme ready to take the Duchy of Savoy while Anselme led the Army of the Var to take Nice.

== Capture ==
Sardinian spies provided good ground information about the situation. It was rumored that they had 35,000 - 40,000. Their reports were mostly dismissed. The Sardinian headquarters at Turin believed that the French were crossing with 35,000 - 40,000 men so General de Courten advised his colonel, Pinto, to evacuate the county without a fight.

French Navy ships appeared. De Courten, aware and scared of French attacks from behind, immediately ordered a retreat and evacuated. Garrisons were left in Fort Mont Alban and some were abandoned in the commune of Villefranche.

Anselme ordered his men to cross the Var, the river where the border of Nice, Sardinia, and France met. His men crossed the Var after the Sardinians evacuated. It was necessary to Anselme to take Villefranche.

Seeing this the remaining Sardinian garrisons in the forts of Mont Alban surrendered. This gave access to Villefranche which he took 2 days later on September 30, 1792.

The county was taken by Anselme and General de Montesquiou took Savoy without a fight. The Duchy of Savoy and County of Nice were given to France who annexed the states until 1814 who was given back to Sardinia after Napoleon I of France lost to the 6th Coalition
