= Army of the Var =

French revolutionary army

The Army of the Var (French: Armée du Var, pronounced [aʁme dy vaʁ]) was one of the French Revolutionary armies. It was established along the River Var, the frontier between France and Piedmont, charged with protecting Provence from invasion.

== Origins ==
In reality, its name was not official. Its origins came about when General Jacques Bernard d'Anselme was charged with commanding a corps in the Army of Midi, which had gathered at the Var. Seeking independence from General de Montesquiou, his superior and commander of the Army of Midi, d'Anselme purposely named his corps the Army of the Var on 29 September 1792, trying to break free from authority. But in reality, it was still only the right wing of the armée du Midi, and only became the Army of Italy on 7 November 1792 by a decree of the Convention.

== Operations ==
At the end of 1792, the Army of the Var crossed the river and took Nice without a battle. The county would be taken as a base of operation for the Army of the Var. The army was shortly absorbed into the Army of Italy and d’Anselme was relieved of command.

The army was revived during the Hundred days under the command of Marshal Brune, seeing independent action against the Austrians until Napoleon's defeat. The Army would never be reformed since 1815.
