= Freda Betti =

French opera singer (1924–1979)

- Born: Frédérique Thérèse Augusta Betti; 26 February 1924; Nice, France
- Died: 13 November 1979 (aged 55); Nice, France
- Burial place: Cimetière du Château
- Education: Conservatory of Nice
- Occupations: Opera singer Singing teacher
- Years active: 1947–1979
- Notable work: Carmen
- Spouse: René Clermont (m. 1949; died 1976)
- Children: 2

Freda Betti (26 February 1924 – 13 November 1979), whose birth name was Frédérique Thérèse Augusta Betti, was a French mezzo-soprano singer whose career was mainly confined to France. She left a range of recordings representative of her repertoire.

== Early life and education ==
Freda Betti was born at 52 rue des Ponchettes in the old town in Nice into a modest family: her father was a house painter and her mother a fishmonger. Her paternal family originated from the region of Emilia-Romagna in Italy: her grandfather was born in Parma and he emigrated to Nice with his wife and children in 1893. She studied music and especially singing at the Conservatory of Nice with Édouard Rouard, where she obtained a Premier Prix de Chant in 1943.

== Career ==
She made her debut at the Opéra de Monte-Carlo in 1947 as Siébel in Faust by Charles Gounod. She appeared frequently with the Orchestre Philharmonique de Radio France of the RTF in the early 1950s, before entering the troupe of the Opéra-Comique in the 1960s. She sang the title role of Carmen more than 150 times and recorded, and her repertoire also included Fricka, Brangaene, Dulcinée in Don Quichotte and Suzuki.

Betti sang on major national stages (Nantes, Nice, Strasbourg, Toulouse) and European (Monte-Carlo, La Scala), as well as in numerous opera festivals, including Aix-en-Provence, Avignon, Bayreuth. Betti recorded for Philips and EMI. Among published recordings she took part in were The Snow Maiden (Bobilicka), Démophon, Tosca (shepherd boy) and Philippine (Isabelle). In 1958 she recorded excerpts from Carmen with Ken Neate, Gabriel Bacquier and Andréa Guiot on Philips P 77118 L.

She participated in the original production of L'Opéra d'Aran by Gilbert Bécaud, in 1962, at the Théâtre des Champs-Élysées. Betti sang the title role of La Périchole on French Culture radio in 1964. In the 1970s she was a vocal teacher at the Conservatory of Monaco.

== Personal life ==
Betti was married on 29 October 1949 in Levallois-Perret to René Clermont (1919–1976). The couple had two children. She was the sister of Henri Betti and the great great-aunt of Alexy Bosetti (but has no family relationship with Laura Betti and Priscilla Betti).

=== Death ===
Freda Betti died at her home in Nice in 1979, at the age of 55, and was buried in the family vault "Famille Betti" with her husband and his parents in the Cimetière du Château ("Carré de l'O.N.U").

== Repertoire ==
List of roles, including recordings:

- 1947: Faust by Charles Gounod – Marthe Schwertlein
- 1950: Le domino noir by Daniel Auber – Ursule
- 1951: L'ivrogne corrigé by Christoph Willibald Gluck – Mathurine
- 1952: Le joueur de flûte by Hervé – Busa
- 1952: Véronique by Andre Messager - Ermerance
- 1952: Jenůfa by Leoš Janáček – the mayor's wife
- 1953: La Rôtisserie de la reine Pédauque by Charles-Gaston Levadé – Jeannette
- 1953: Les saltimbanques by Louis Ganne - Marian
- 1954: Roméo et Juliette by Charles Gounod – Gertrude
- 1955: The Barber of Seville by Gioachino Rossini – Berta
- 1955: The Snow Maiden by Nikolai Rimsky-Korsakov – Bobilichka
- 1955: Oedipe by Enescu - Mérope
- 1956: Le jour et la nuit by Charles Lecocq – Sanchette
- 1956: Le Médium by Gian Carlo Menotti – Madame Nolan
- 1956: La Périchole by Jacques Offenbach – Mastrillas, Brambilla
- 1956: Madame l'archiduc by Jacques Offenbach – the Countess
- 1957: Gillette de Narbonne by Edmond Audran – Gillette de Narbonne
- 1957: Les bavards by Jacques Offenbach – Béatrix
- 1958: The Love for Three Oranges by Sergei Prokofiev – Linette
- 1960: Le Médecin malgré lui by Charles Gounod – Martine
- 1961: Padmâvatî by Albert Roussel – a woman of the people and the second woman of the palace
- 1961: Lavinia by Henry Barraud – Nunziatina
- 1961: Rip Van Winkle by Robert Planquette – Kate
- 1962: Orpheus in the Underworld by Jacques Offenbach – Public Opinion
- 1962: Rhodope by Louis Ganne – Nausicaa
- 1963: Giroflé-Girofla by Charles Lecocq – Aurore
- 1964: La chanson de Fortunio by Jacques Offenbach – Babet

=== Television ===
- 1956: Le Médium (adaptation of The Medium) by Claude Loursais : Madame Nolan. (RTF)
- 1957: Les Bavards (adaptation of Les bavards) by Bronislaw Horowicz : Béatrice. (RTF)
- 1960: Le Médecin malgré lui (adaptation of Le médecin malgré lui) by Claude Loursais : Martine. (RTF)
