= Cimetière du Château =

Cemetery in Nice, France

Coordinates: 43°41′53″N 7°16′50″E

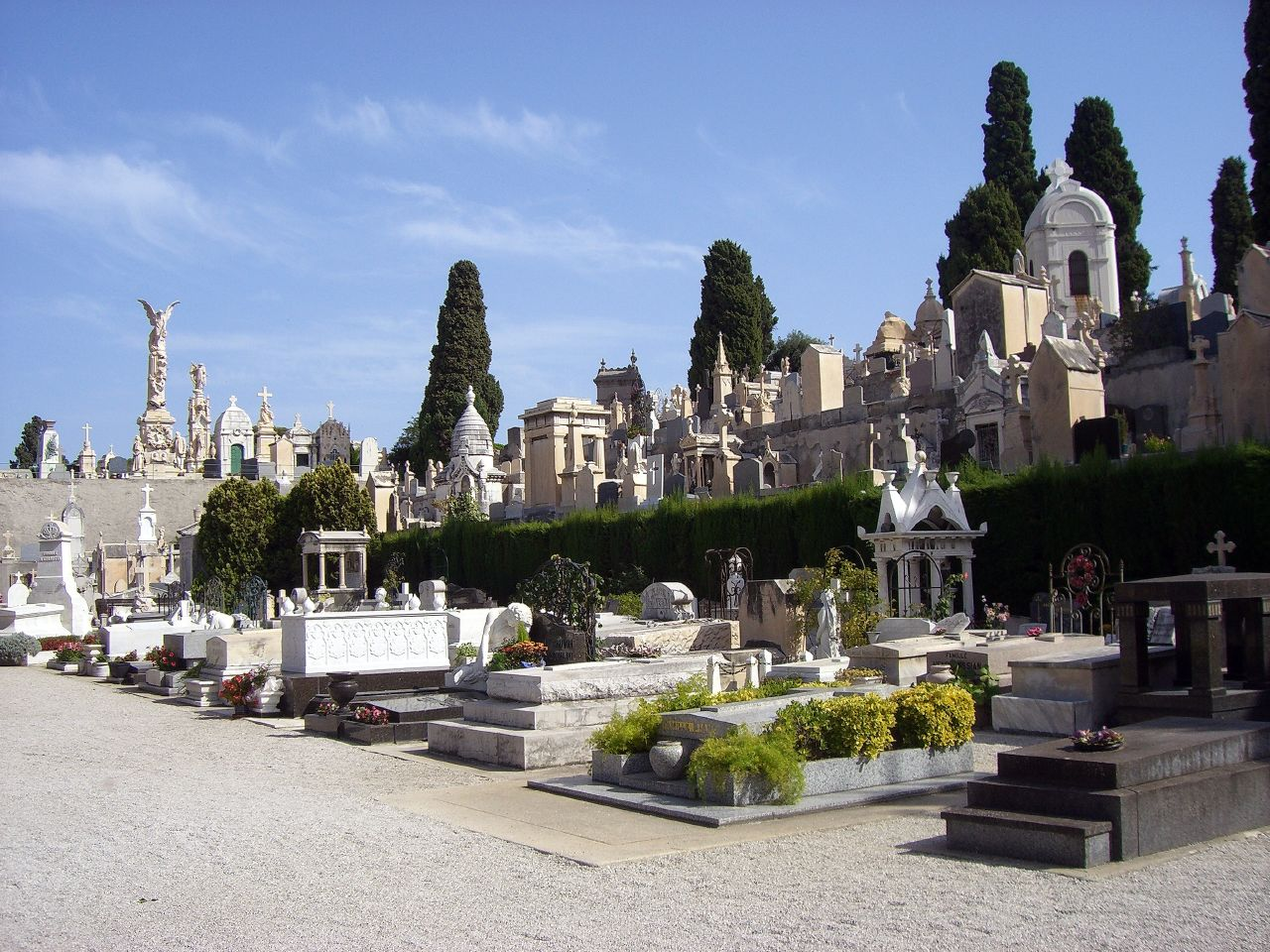
The Cimetière du Château, Nice

The Cimetière du Château in Nice, France, stands on the old citadel of Nice. Today, some sections of the massive walls of the ancient fortress remain. The fortress, which was built in the 16th century, was once one of the most secure strongholds in France. The cemetery itself was founded in 1783 and has 2,800 graves. It is as much popular for its function and history as for the scenic views of the city that affords.

== Notable burials ==
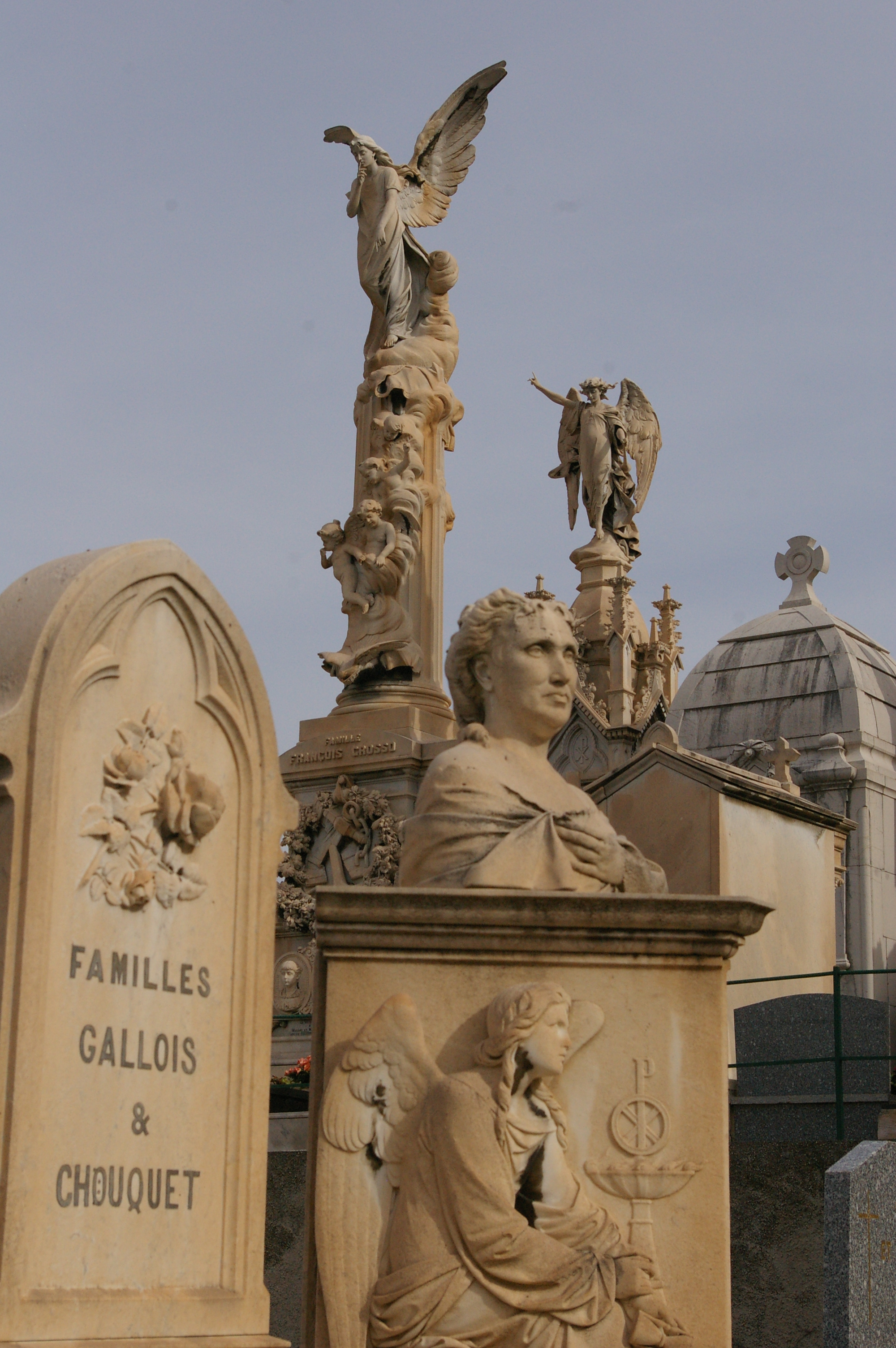
Graves in the Cimetière du Château

- Freda Betti (1924–1979), opera singer
- Robert Borwick, 1st Baron Borwick (1845–1936)
- Alfred Van Cleef, jeweller
- Édouard Corniglion-Molinier (1898-1963), aviator, general, minister and film producer
- Gaspard Eberlé ( (1761–1837), French general, Governor of Nice 1802–1814
- Louis Feuillade (1873–1925), film director
- Léon Gambetta (1838–1882), French statesman
- José Gustavo Guerrero (1857–1958), first president of the International Court of Justice
- Alexander Herzen (1812–1870), writer, novelist
- Gaston Leroux (1868–1927), journalist, novelist
- Emil Jellinek-Mercedes (1853–1918)
- Carolina Otero (1868–1965), dancer
- Renée Saint-Cyr (1904–2004), actress
- Agathe-Sophie Sasserno (1810–1860), French poet
- René Goscinny (1926-1977), French scenarist
