= Jean-Honoré de Trogoff de Kerlessy =

French contre-amiral

Jean-Honoré de Trogoff de Kerlessy (5 May 1751 in Lanmeur – February 1794 in the roadstead at Porto-Ferrajo, Elba) was a French count and contre-amiral, notable for handing over the French fleet at Toulon over to the British in 1793.

== Life ==
A son of Marc Louis de Trogoff de Kerlessy and Jeanne Eléonore Bourel de Kermès, de Kerlessy joined the Ancien Régime French fleet as a volunteer in 1764 and fought in the 1765 campaign against the Salétins. From 1773 to 1774 he took part in an exploratory voyage under Kerguelen, during which he was promoted to enseigne de vaisseau. He was captured by a British privateer in 1778. In March of the next year Trogoff was promoted lieutenant de vaisseau.

After fighting under d'Estaing, he was made second in command of the 74-gun Glorieux, which became part of the comte de Grasse's squadron in March 1781, which in September 1781 defeated the British at Chesapeake. However, de Kerlessy was then also present at the squadron's defeat at the Saintes on 12 April 1782. When the British commander Rodney cut the French line, the Glorieux found itself fired on by six British ships of the line in rapid succession and her commander was soon killed. de Kerlessy then took over command, though the ship was now disabled. He then fought on for more than six hours, losing most of his crew killed and wounded before finally striking his flag and surrendering. He was taken prisoner but freed in 1783. His heroic defense resulted in his acquittal at the court martial for the loss of his vessel. He was promoted to capitaine de vaisseau in 1784 and given the cross of the order of Saint-Louis.

Trogoff's great knowledge of the Antilles led to his holding several commands on Saint-Domingue, including the Active in 1786, then the Duguay-Trouin in 1791. The latter carried several soldiers to the island to reinforce French control after riots and protests against the abolition of slavery. He was made a contre-amiral on 1 January 1793 and commander in chief of France's Atlantic forces on 25 May 1793. He returned to the Mediterranean and in August 1793 handed Toulon and its fleet over to the British. One of his adjutants, Saint-Julien, refused to surrender and defected to the Republican forces with 300 sailors. Trogoff was made an outlaw by the Republican government on 9 September that year and on 18 December boarded a British ship after Dugommier and Napoleon Bonaparte retook the town. William Sidney Smith set fire to the main magazine and eight of the French ships of the line before departing.

Trogoff emigrated, subsequently dying in February 1794.

== Sources ==
- This page is a translation of its French equivalent.
