= Army of the Midi =

Unit of the French army

The Army of the Midi (Armée du Midi) was a unit of the French army, stationed in the Midi region and created by royal decree of Louis XVI on 13 April 1792. The first leader of the army was Jacques Bernard d'Anselme.
