= Anne-Pierre, marquis de Montesquiou-Fézensac =

French general and writer (1739–1798)

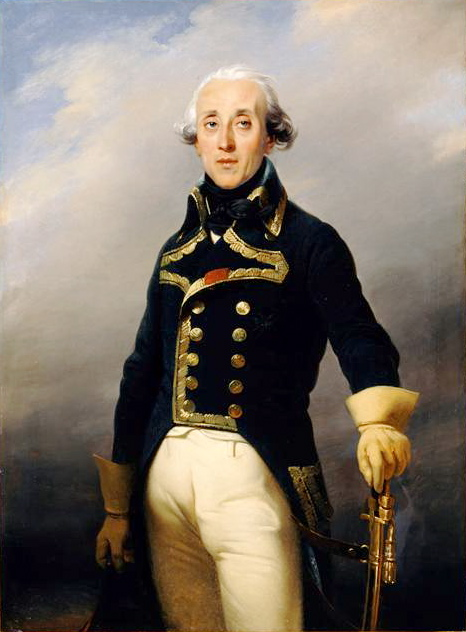
- Anne-Pierre, marquis de Montesquiou-Fézensac by Claude-Marie Dubufe
- Born: 17 October 1739; Paris, Kingdom of France
- Died: 30 December 1798 (aged 59); Paris, France
- Military career
- Allegiance: Kingdom of France; Kingdom of France; French First Republic
- Branch: Infantry
- Service years: 1754–1792
- Rank: Lieutenant General
- Commands: Army of the Midi; Army of the Alps
- Conflicts: War of the First Coalition; Invasion of Savoy (1792)

Anne-Pierre, marquis de Montesquiou-Fézensac (17 October 1739 – 30 December 1798) was a French general and writer. Due to his literary talent, he became a member of the Académie Française in 1784. He was elected to the Estates General of 1789. He assumed command of the Army of the Midi in February 1792 and successfully invaded Savoy in September. Nevertheless, he was accused of treason by the Revolutionary government and fled to Switzerland before he could be arrested. He was allowed to return to France in 1795 and he died there three years later.

== Career ==
He was born in Paris, of a family from Armagnac. He was brought up with the children of the king of France, and showed some taste for letters. He entered the army in 1754, was successively colonel of the Grenadiers and the Royal-Vaissaux regiment, and in 1780 was made maréchal-de-camp. Some pieces of verse and several comedies gained him admission to the Académie Française in 1784. He was elected deputy to the Estates General of 1789 by the nobles of Paris, and, animated by liberal ideas, he soon joined the Third Estate, and seconded Jacques Necker's financial schemes.

He served on the committee charged with the issue of assignats, and was named president of the Constituent Assembly on 14 March 1791. In May 1791 he was promoted lieutenant-general, served under Lafayette, and in February 1792 was given the command of the Army of the South. In September of the same year he completed the conquest of Savoy. In November 1792 he was accused of royalist leanings, and he fled to Switzerland. In 1795 his name was erased from the list of émigrés and he returned to Paris, where he died on 30 December 1798.

His is one of the names inscribed on the Arc de Triomphe, in column 23.
