= Jacques Bernard d'Anselme =

French general

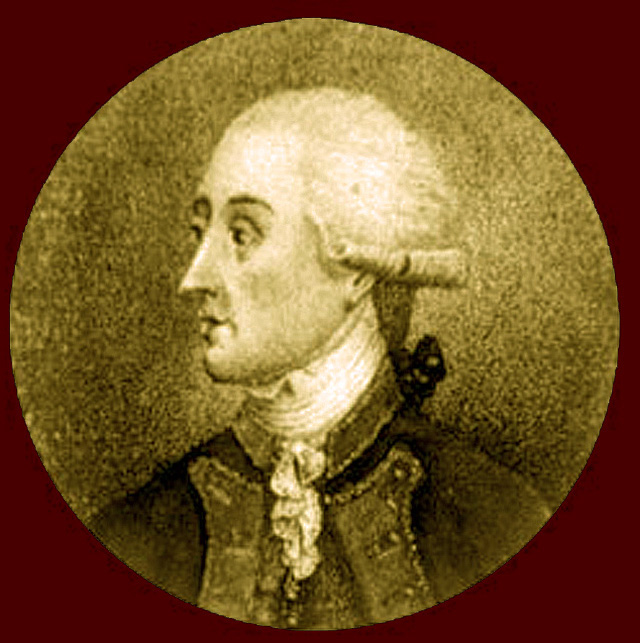
- Born: 22 July 1740; Apt, Vaucluse, France
- Died: 17 September 1814 (aged 74) Paris, France
- Allegiance: Kingdom of France; France
- Branch: Infantry
- Service years: (Kingdom of France) ?–1792 (France) 1792–1793, 1798–1814
- Rank: General of Division
- Conflicts: American Revolutionary War; War of the First Coalition; Capture of Nice; Raid on Oneglia
- Awards: Order of Saint-Louis, 1770; Légion d'Honneur, 1805

Jacques Bernard Modeste d'Anselme (22 July 1740, Apt – 17 September 1814, Paris) was a French general of the French Revolutionary Army, notable as the first commander of the Army of the Var which soon became the Army of Italy. He fell under suspicion, was removed from command and placed under arrest, but he survived the Reign of Terror. ANSELME is one of the names inscribed under the Arc de Triomphe, on Column 23.

== Biography ==
He became a knight of Saint Louis on 18 April 1770. During the American Revolution, he was a lieutenant colonel of the Regiment of Soissons. As lieutenant general, he took Nice and the fortresses of Mont Alban and Villefranche-sur-Mer in 1792, but was defeated at Sospello and imprisoned until the revolution of Thermidor. His name is inscribed on the Arc de Triomphe.

== Notes ==
Military offices
Preceded by New organization	Commander-in-chief of the Army of Italy; 7 November–26 December 1792	Succeeded by Gaspard Jean-Baptiste Brunet
