= Laurent Hoffmayer =

German French Imperial Army officer

Baron Laurent Hoffmayer
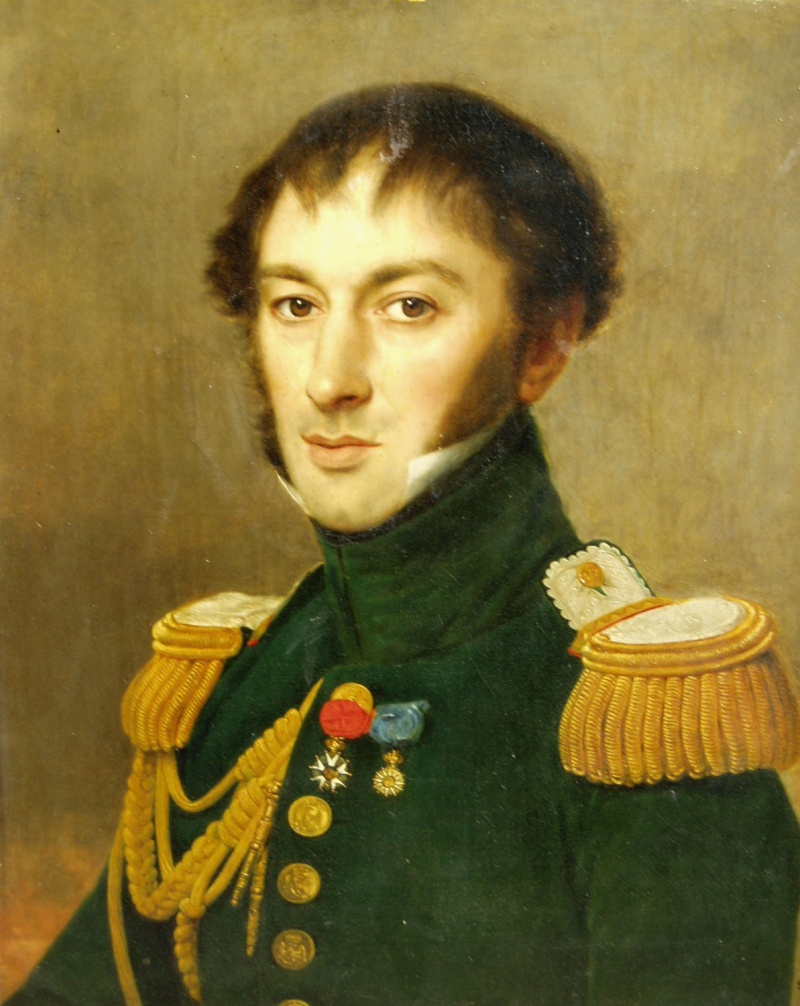
- Portrait of Hoffmayer as Colonel-Major of the Imperial Guard Dragoons in 1815.
- Born: 15 July 1768; Friedenweiler, Margraviate of Baden
- Died: 9 August 1842 (aged 74); Paris, Seine-et-Marne, Kingdom of the French
- Military career
- Allegiance: First French Republic; First French Empire (1804–1814, 1815); Kingdom of France (1814, 1815–1822)
- Branch: (French First Republic) French Revolutionary Army; (First French Empire) French Imperial Army; (Kingdom of France) French Royal Army
- Service years: 1792–1822
- Units: 2nd Dragoon Regiment; Dragoon Regiment of the Imperial Guard
- Conflicts: Napoleonic Wars

Laurent Hoffmayer (15 July 1768 – 9 August 1842) was a German officer of the French Imperial Army notably serving as Colonel of the 2nd Dragoon Regiment and later Empress's Dragoons of the Imperial Guard, leading that regiment at the Battle of Waterloo.

== Biography ==
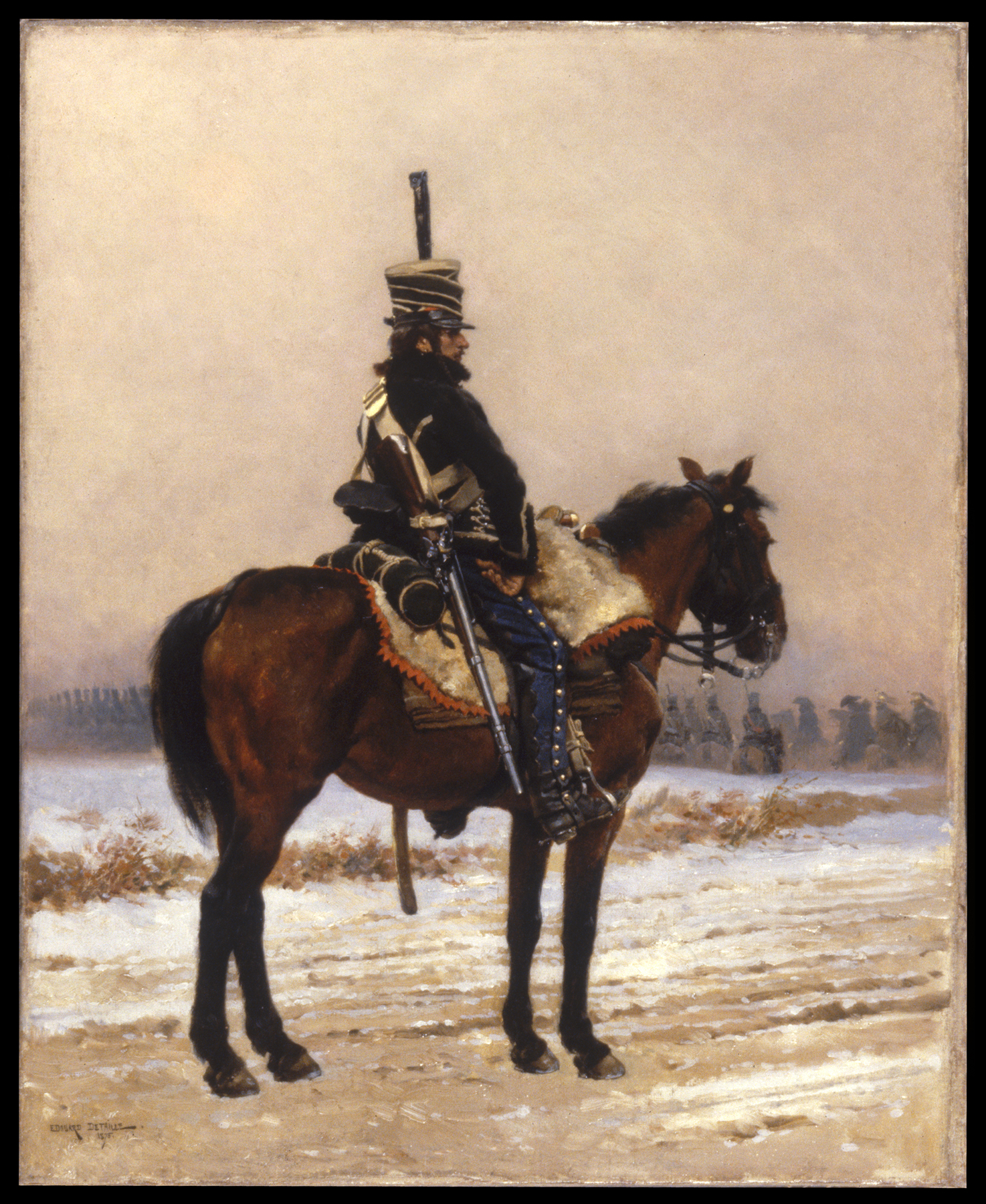
Chevalier of the 11th Hussar Regiment during the Consulate period.

=== Early years ===
Laurent Hoffmayer began his army career on 4 September 1792 after volunteering to join the newly formed Germanic Legion. When this legion was dissolved on 22 June 1793, Hoffmayer transferred to the 11th Hussar Regiment with the rank of Brigadier, equivalent to that of ensign. He later served in the Army of the Rhine, and earned his promotion to second lieutenant and was wounded at the Battle of Pozzolo on 25 December 1800.

By September 1803, after Napoleon's rise to power, Hoffmayer became Lieutenant Colonel of the 11th Hussars, and when this regiments is converted to the 29th Dragoon Regiment that year, he continues to serve as commanding officer. In 1805, the regiment is sent to the Italian Peninsula as part of the Army of Italy and while serving under command of Marshal André Masséna partakes in the Battle of Caldiero on 30 October. The regiment remains in the new Kingdom of Naples in 1806 and 1807.

=== Empress Dragoons ===
Following Hoffmayer's good conduct during previous campaigns, Napoléon approves his appointment as captain in the newly formed Empress's Dragoons of the Imperial Guard effective 8 July 1807.

As the Napoleonic Wars continued, Hoffmayer leads the regiment during the Peninsular War in 1808, and the Danube Campaign in 1809 part of the War of the Fifth Coalition. Following the end of the Danube Campaign, the false belief of peace lead to a reduction in the French Army, but Hoffmayer is promoted to squadron commander effective 3 August 1809. Three years later, during the French Invasion of Russia in 1812, Hoffmayer leads a reconnaissance squadron of 150 dragoons commanded by Major Louis Ignace Marthod when they are ambushed just outside of Moscow. The squadron, surrounded, refuses to surrender and manage to fight their way through the middle of the Russian scouts where 20 men are killed. Hoffmayer himself who participated in the battle receives two wounds: a lance into his right arm, and a sabre slash across his head.

=== Later years ===
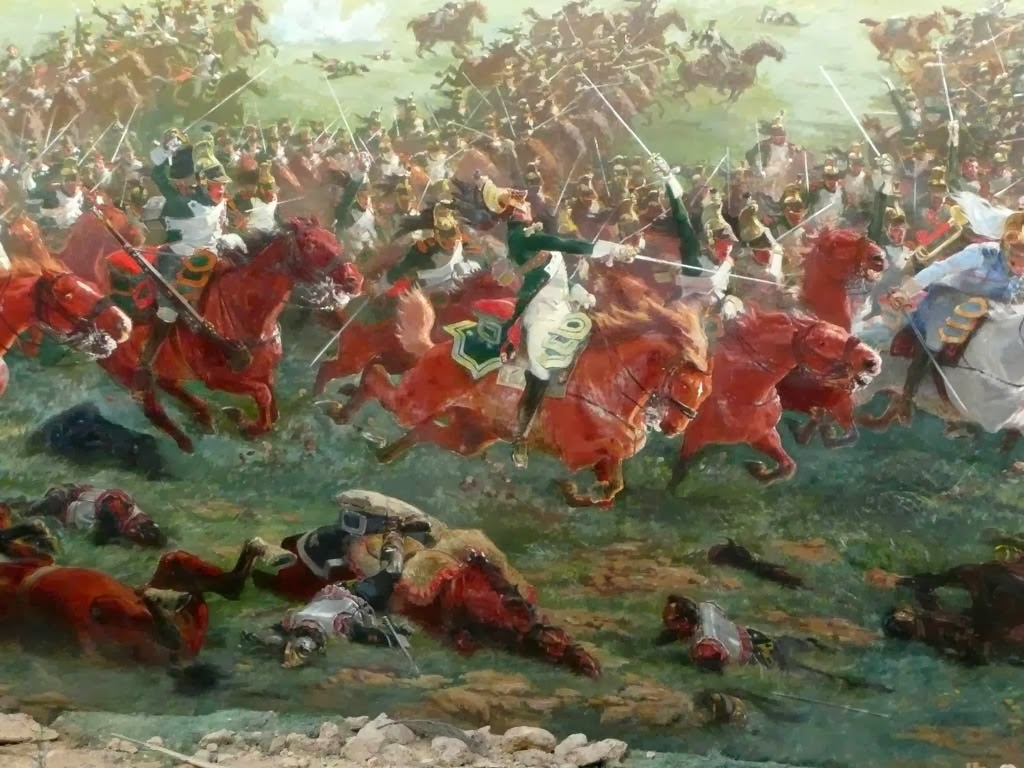
Panorama of the Imperial Guard Dragoons charging during the Battle of Waterloo.

On 18 February 1813, Hoffmayer is appointed Colonel of the 2nd Dragoon Regiment, which takes part in the German campaign of 1813, and on 17 December replaced Colonel Leclerc as Colonel-Major of the new 2nd Scout Regiment of the Imperial Guard. Hoffmayer continues to serve as Colonel-Major and leads the regiment during the 1814 campaign in North-eastern France. After the First Bourbon Restoration, Hoffmayer is appointed a Major in the renamed Imperial Guard Dragoons, now known as the Royal Dragoon Corps of France.

Following Napoleon's return, Hoffmayer returns to the Army and keeps his rank as Major of the Imperial Guard Dragoons. Following the death of General Louis-Michel Letort de Lorville, Hoffmayer is made commander of the Imperial Guard Dragoons and leads the regiment during its last charge at the Battle of Waterloo on 18 June 1815.

=== End of Career ===
Following the Second Bourbon Restoration, Hoffmayer is placed on half pay on 16 December 1815 and admitted to retirement on 4 September 1822. After retirement, Hoffmayer is appointed commander of the Clermont-Ferrand and Caen remount dépôts. During the July Revolution, the old Colonel Hoffmayer leads the Military School of Paris Cadets and escorts the new king Louis Philippe I to his palace.

On 9 August 1842, Hoffmayer dies at the age of 74.

== Awards ==
Date of Appointment	Award
21 March 1806	Knight of the Legion of Honour
15 March 1810	Knight of the Empire
14 July 1813	Officer of the Legion of Honour
4 December 1813	Baron of the Empire
27 December 1814	Knight of the Royal and Military Order of Saint Louis
