= Battle of Loano order of battle =

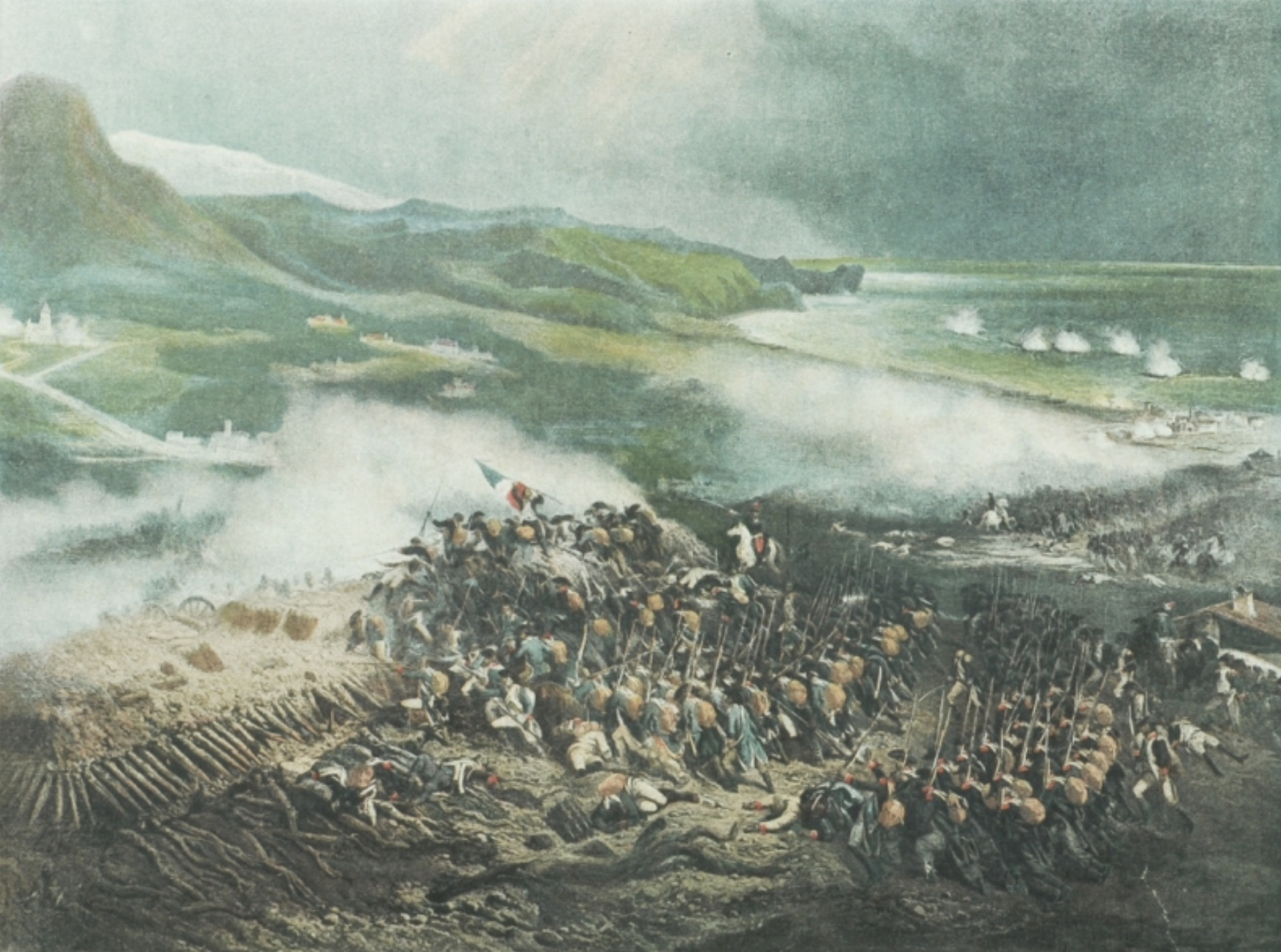
Painting of the Battle of Loano by Hippolyte Bellangé

The Battle of Loana order of battle shows the forces involved in the Battle of Loano (23–24 November 1795), during which the army of the French First Republic attacked the combined forces of Habsburg Austria and the Kingdom of Sardinia-Piedmont. The action resulted in a French tactical victory. The orders of battle are listed below.

== Abbreviations ==
=== Military rank ===
- GD = French General of Division
- GB = French General of Brigade
- FZM = Austrian Feldzeugmeister
- FML = Austrian Feldmarschall-Leutnant
- GM = Austrian Generalmajor
- MG = Sardinian Major General
- Col = Sardinian Colonel

=== Other ===
- mw = Mortally wounded
- w = Wounded
- c = Captured
- Det. = Detachment

== Orders of battle ==
=== French ===
- Army of Italy Commander: GD Barthélemy Louis Joseph Schérer

- Chief of Staff: GD Paul Louis Gaultier de Kervéguen
- GD André Massena commanded the two divisions and reserve belonging to the Center.
- Massena assumed direct command of Charlet's division after Charlet was mortally wounded.

There were two more field divisions in the Army of Italy. These were GD François Macquard's division guarding the Col de Tende and GD Pierre Dominique Garnier's division on the extreme left flank. Neither were directly engaged in the Battle of Loano, nor are they included in the following order of battle.

French Army of Italy at Loano (Note: In January 1796, the units shown here were reorganized into stronger demi-brigades. Then, on 17 March 1796, the regiments were renumbered. For example, what became the 211th Demi-Brigade in January was renamed the 18th Line Infantry Demi-Brigade in March (Phipps, pp. 273–274).)
Division	Brigade	Units	Strength
Right Wing; GD Charles-Pierre Augereau	GB Pierre Banel (w); GB Claude-Victor Perrin; GB Elzéar Dommartin; GB Jean-Baptiste Rusca (Note: No brigade organization was listed for the Right Wing. Nafziger listed only the first three brigadiers. Phipps asserted that Rusca led a fourth brigade and that after Banel was wounded, Col Jean Lannes assumed command of Banel's brigade (Phipps, p. 264).)	6th Grenadier Battalion	384
Right Wing; GD Charles-Pierre Augereau	GB Pierre Banel (w); GB Claude-Victor Perrin; GB Elzéar Dommartin; GB Jean-Baptiste Rusca	14th Grenadier Battalion	188
Right Wing; GD Charles-Pierre Augereau	GB Pierre Banel (w); GB Claude-Victor Perrin; GB Elzéar Dommartin; GB Jean-Baptiste Rusca	Det. 8th Grenadier Battalion	116
Right Wing; GD Charles-Pierre Augereau	GB Pierre Banel (w); GB Claude-Victor Perrin; GB Elzéar Dommartin; GB Jean-Baptiste Rusca	1st Light Infantry Demi-Brigade	401
Right Wing; GD Charles-Pierre Augereau	GB Pierre Banel (w); GB Claude-Victor Perrin; GB Elzéar Dommartin; GB Jean-Baptiste Rusca	Line Infantry Chasseurs	650
Right Wing; GD Charles-Pierre Augereau	GB Pierre Banel (w); GB Claude-Victor Perrin; GB Elzéar Dommartin; GB Jean-Baptiste Rusca	Det. 21st Line Infantry Demi-Brigade	164
Right Wing; GD Charles-Pierre Augereau	GB Pierre Banel (w); GB Claude-Victor Perrin; GB Elzéar Dommartin; GB Jean-Baptiste Rusca	99th Line Infantry Demi-Brigade	396
Right Wing; GD Charles-Pierre Augereau	GB Pierre Banel (w); GB Claude-Victor Perrin; GB Elzéar Dommartin; GB Jean-Baptiste Rusca	10th Battalion/Ain Volunteers	393
Right Wing; GD Charles-Pierre Augereau	GB Pierre Banel (w); GB Claude-Victor Perrin; GB Elzéar Dommartin; GB Jean-Baptiste Rusca	Det. 18th Line Infantry Demi-Brigade	158
Right Wing; GD Charles-Pierre Augereau	GB Pierre Banel (w); GB Claude-Victor Perrin; GB Elzéar Dommartin; GB Jean-Baptiste Rusca	105th Line Infantry Demi-Brigade	450
Right Wing; GD Charles-Pierre Augereau	GB Pierre Banel (w); GB Claude-Victor Perrin; GB Elzéar Dommartin; GB Jean-Baptiste Rusca	55th Line Infantry Demi-Brigade	217
Right Wing; GD Charles-Pierre Augereau	GB Pierre Banel (w); GB Claude-Victor Perrin; GB Elzéar Dommartin; GB Jean-Baptiste Rusca	69th Line Infantry Demi-Brigade	274
Right Wing; GD Charles-Pierre Augereau	GB Pierre Banel (w); GB Claude-Victor Perrin; GB Elzéar Dommartin; GB Jean-Baptiste Rusca	4th Provisional Demi-Brigade	179
Right Wing; GD Charles-Pierre Augereau	GB Pierre Banel (w); GB Claude-Victor Perrin; GB Elzéar Dommartin; GB Jean-Baptiste Rusca	15th Provisional Demi-Brigade	131
Right Wing; GD Charles-Pierre Augereau	GB Pierre Banel (w); GB Claude-Victor Perrin; GB Elzéar Dommartin; GB Jean-Baptiste Rusca	Grenadier Battalion	423
Right Wing; GD Charles-Pierre Augereau	GB Pierre Banel (w); GB Claude-Victor Perrin; GB Elzéar Dommartin; GB Jean-Baptiste Rusca	145th Line Infantry Demi-Brigade	261
Right Wing; GD Charles-Pierre Augereau	GB Pierre Banel (w); GB Claude-Victor Perrin; GB Elzéar Dommartin; GB Jean-Baptiste Rusca	147th Line Infantry Demi-Brigade	488
Right Wing; GD Charles-Pierre Augereau	GB Pierre Banel (w); GB Claude-Victor Perrin; GB Elzéar Dommartin; GB Jean-Baptiste Rusca	19th Line Infantry Demi-Brigade	911
Right Wing; GD Charles-Pierre Augereau	GB Pierre Banel (w); GB Claude-Victor Perrin; GB Elzéar Dommartin; GB Jean-Baptiste Rusca	39th Line Infantry Demi-Brigade	571
Right Wing; GD Charles-Pierre Augereau	GB Pierre Banel (w); GB Claude-Victor Perrin; GB Elzéar Dommartin; GB Jean-Baptiste Rusca	12th Grenadier Battalion	206
Right Wing; GD Charles-Pierre Augereau	GB Pierre Banel (w); GB Claude-Victor Perrin; GB Elzéar Dommartin; GB Jean-Baptiste Rusca	Right Wing Total	6,961
Center: 1st Division; GD Étienne Charlet (mw)	GB Philippe Ménard	Sappers (2 companies)	216
Center: 1st Division; GD Étienne Charlet (mw)	GB Philippe Ménard	13th Provisional Demi-Brigade	516
Center: 1st Division; GD Étienne Charlet (mw)	GB Philippe Ménard	14th Provisional Demi-Brigade	649
Center: 1st Division; GD Étienne Charlet (mw)	GB Philippe Ménard	Eclaireurs	800
Center: 1st Division; GD Étienne Charlet (mw)	GB Jean-Baptiste Cervoni	Det. 8th Light Infantry Demi-Brigade	144
Center: 1st Division; GD Étienne Charlet (mw)	GB Jean-Baptiste Cervoni	16th Light Infantry Demi-Brigade	619
Center: 1st Division; GD Étienne Charlet (mw)	GB Jean-Baptiste Cervoni	2nd Battalion/6th Provisional Demi-Brigade	108
Center: 1st Division; GD Étienne Charlet (mw)	GB Jean-Baptiste Cervoni	3rd Battalion/122nd Line Infantry Demi-Brigade	208
Center: 1st Division; GD Étienne Charlet (mw)	GB Jean-Baptiste Cervoni	11th Grenadier Battalion	440
Center: 1st Division; GD Étienne Charlet (mw)	GB Jean-Baptiste Cervoni	79th Line Infantry Demi-Brigade	634
Center: 2nd Division; GD Amédée Laharpe	GB Louis de Saint-Hilaire	Sappers (2 companies)	180
Center: 2nd Division; GD Amédée Laharpe	GB Louis de Saint-Hilaire	129th Line Infantry Demi-Brigade	836
Center: 2nd Division; GD Amédée Laharpe	GB Louis de Saint-Hilaire	2nd Battalion/3rd Line Infantry Demi-Brigade	272
Center: 2nd Division; GD Amédée Laharpe	GB Louis de Saint-Hilaire	3rd Battalion/84th Line Infantry Demi-Brigade	198
Center: 2nd Division; GD Amédée Laharpe	GB Jean Joseph Pijon	1st Grenadier Battalion	422
Center: 2nd Division; GD Amédée Laharpe	GB Jean Joseph Pijon	3rd Grenadier Battalion	460
Center: 2nd Division; GD Amédée Laharpe	GB Jean Joseph Pijon	5th Grenadier Battalion	400
Center: 2nd Division; GD Amédée Laharpe	GB Jean Joseph Pijon	10th Grenadier Battalion	431
Center: 2nd Division; GD Amédée Laharpe	GB Jean Joseph Pijon	101st Line Infantry Demi-Brigade	900
Center: 2nd Division; GD Amédée Laharpe	GB Jean Joseph Pijon	1st & 2nd Battalions; 3rd Light Infantry Demi-Brigade	644
Center: 2nd Division; GD Amédée Laharpe	GB Jean Joseph Pijon	2nd Battalion/102nd Line Infantry Demi-Brigade	238
Center: 2nd Division; GD Amédée Laharpe	GB Jean Joseph Pijon	2nd Battalion/84th Line Infantry Demi-Brigade	274
Center: Reserve	GB Guilin Laurent Bizanet	152nd Line Infantry Demi-Brigade	1,205
Center: Reserve	GB Guilin Laurent Bizanet	2nd Grenadier Battalion	445
Center: Reserve	GB Guilin Laurent Bizanet	13th Grenadier Battalion	496
Center: Reserve	GB Guilin Laurent Bizanet	1st Battalion/100th Line Infantry Demi-Brigade	266
Center: Reserve	GB Guilin Laurent Bizanet	1st Provisional Demi-Brigade	625
Center: Reserve	GB Guilin Laurent Bizanet	70th Line Infantry Demi-Brigade	650
Center: Reserve	GB Guilin Laurent Bizanet	Center Total	13,276
Left Wing; GD Jean Sérurier	GB Louis Pelletier; GB François de Miollis; GB Paul Guillaume (Note: No brigade organization was listed for the Left Wing.)	2nd Battalion/Haute-Loire Volunteers	unknown
Left Wing; GD Jean Sérurier	GB Louis Pelletier; GB François de Miollis; GB Paul Guillaume	1st Battalion/84th Line Infantry Demi-Brigade	351
Left Wing; GD Jean Sérurier	GB Louis Pelletier; GB François de Miollis; GB Paul Guillaume	3rd Eclaireur Company	195
Left Wing; GD Jean Sérurier	GB Louis Pelletier; GB François de Miollis; GB Paul Guillaume	1st & 2nd Battalions; 46th Line Infantry Demi-Brigade	609
Left Wing; GD Jean Sérurier	GB Louis Pelletier; GB François de Miollis; GB Paul Guillaume	51st Line Infantry Demi-Brigade	599
Left Wing; GD Jean Sérurier	GB Louis Pelletier; GB François de Miollis; GB Paul Guillaume	3rd Battalion/6th Light Infantry Demi-Brigade	594
Left Wing; GD Jean Sérurier	GB Louis Pelletier; GB François de Miollis; GB Paul Guillaume	Grenadier companies 109th Line Infantry Demi-Brigade	152
Left Wing; GD Jean Sérurier	GB Louis Pelletier; GB François de Miollis; GB Paul Guillaume	2nd & 3rd Battalions; 117th Line Infantry Demi-Brigade	678
Left Wing; GD Jean Sérurier	GB Louis Pelletier; GB François de Miollis; GB Paul Guillaume	1st Battalion/Maine-et-Loire Volunteers	600
Left Wing; GD Jean Sérurier	GB Louis Pelletier; GB François de Miollis; GB Paul Guillaume	1st & 3rd Battalions; 56th Line Infantry Demi-Brigade	257
Left Wing; GD Jean Sérurier	GB Louis Pelletier; GB François de Miollis; GB Paul Guillaume	2nd Battalion/166th Line Infantry Demi-Brigade	210
Left Wing; GD Jean Sérurier	GB Louis Pelletier; GB François de Miollis; GB Paul Guillaume	Left Wing Total	5,155

=== Austrians ===
- Army of Italy Commander: FZM Olivier, Count of Wallis

- 23,380 infantry, 2,788 cavalry, 772 artillery
- Nafziger had no Austrian order of battle for Loano. The previous available report was from 20 June 1795, as follows.

Austrian Army of Italy on 20 June 1795
Division	Brigade	Units	Battalions	Squadrons
Division; FML Johann von Wenckheim	GM Mathias Rukavina	Karlstadter Grenz Regiment (Note: The list did not specify which of the Karlstadter Grenz regiments this was.)	2	0
Division; FML Johann von Wenckheim	GM Mathias Rukavina	Szluiner Grenz Regiment Nr. 63	1	0
Division; FML Johann von Wenckheim	GM Mathias Rukavina	Strassoldo Infantry Regiment Nr. 27	2	0
Division; FML Johann von Wenckheim	GM Mathias Rukavina	Meszaros Uhlan Regiment	0	2
Division; FML Johann von Wenckheim	GM Michael von Ternyey (c)	Nadasdy Infantry Regiment Nr. 39	2	0
Division; FML Johann von Wenckheim	GM Michael von Ternyey (c)	Archduke Anton Infantry Regiment Nr. 52	2	0
Division; FML Johann von Wenckheim	GM Philipp Pittoni	Brechainville Infantry Regiment Nr. 25	1	0
Division; FML Johann von Wenckheim	GM Philipp Pittoni	Lattermann Infantry Regiment Nr. 45	2	0
Division; FML Johann von Wenckheim	GM Philipp Pittoni	Alvinczi Infantry Regiment Nr. 19	2	0
Division; FML Johann von Wenckheim	GM Anton Lipthay	Reisky Infantry Regiment Nr. 13	3	0
Division; FML Johann von Wenckheim	GM Anton Lipthay	Terzi Infantry Regiment Nr. 16	3	0
Division; GM Karl von Türkheim	GM Joseph Canto d'Irles	Thurn Infantry Regiment Nr. 43	3	0
Division; GM Karl von Türkheim	GM Joseph Canto d'Irles	Jordis Infantry Regiment Nr. 59	1	0
Division; GM Karl von Türkheim	GM Joseph Canto d'Irles	Wilhelm Schröder Infantry Regiment Nr. 26	1	0
Division; GM Karl von Türkheim	GM Wilhelm Fischer	Meszaros Uhlan Regiment	0	6
Division; GM Karl von Türkheim	GM Wilhelm Fischer	Erdödy Hussar Regiment Nr. 9	0	2
Division; GM Karl von Türkheim	Alessandro Filangieri, Prince of Cuto (Neapolitans)	King's Dragoon Regiment	0	4
Division; GM Karl von Türkheim	Alessandro Filangieri, Prince of Cuto (Neapolitans)	Queen's Dragoon Regiment	0	4
Division; GM Karl von Türkheim	Alessandro Filangieri, Prince of Cuto (Neapolitans)	Prince Royal Dragoon Regiment	0	4

=== Sardinians ===
- Army Commander: FML Michelangelo Alessandro Colli-Marchi

- Chief of staff: Col Joseph Henri Costa de Beauregard
- Nafziger listed no Sardinian orders of battle for 1795, but there is one for January 1796, as follows.

Sardinian Army of Ceva in January 1796
Division	Units	Battalions	Companies
1st Division; Col Theodor Hyacinth Brempt	Vercelli Infantry Regiment	2	0
1st Division; Col Theodor Hyacinth Brempt	Geneva Infantry Regiment	2	0
1st Division; Col Theodor Hyacinth Brempt	Royal German Infantry Regiment	2	0
1st Division; Col Theodor Hyacinth Brempt	Chablais Infantry Regiment	2	0
2nd Division; MG Luigi Costa della Trinità, Marquis of Montafia	Savoy Infantry Regiment	2	0
2nd Division; MG Luigi Costa della Trinità, Marquis of Montafia	Queen's Infantry Regiment	2	0
2nd Division; MG Luigi Costa della Trinità, Marquis of Montafia	Stettler Infantry Regiment	3	0
2nd Division; MG Luigi Costa della Trinità, Marquis of Montafia	Balegno Legion	1	0
2nd Division; MG Luigi Costa della Trinità, Marquis of Montafia	Saluggia Chasseurs	1	0
2nd Division; MG Luigi Costa della Trinità, Marquis of Montafia	Colli Chasseurs	1	0
2nd Division; MG Luigi Costa della Trinità, Marquis of Montafia	Tortona Infantry Regiment	1	0
2nd Division; MG Luigi Costa della Trinità, Marquis of Montafia	Chasseurs Francs	0	?
2nd Division; MG Luigi Costa della Trinità, Marquis of Montafia	Giulay Freikorps	0	?
1st Division of the Right; Col Jean-Gaspard Dichat de Toisinge	Dichat Grenadier Regiment	2	0
1st Division of the Right; Col Jean-Gaspard Dichat de Toisinge	Oneglia Infantry Regiment	2	0
1st Division of the Right; Col Jean-Gaspard Dichat de Toisinge	Oneglia Regiment Elite companies	0	3
1st Division of the Right; Col Jean-Gaspard Dichat de Toisinge	Light Legion Elite companies	0	6
1st Division of the Right; Col Jean-Gaspard Dichat de Toisinge	Bellegarde Legion	1	0
1st Division of the Right; Col Jean-Gaspard Dichat de Toisinge	Chasseurs Francs	0	4
1st Division of the Right; Col Jean-Gaspard Dichat de Toisinge	Militia	?	?
1st Division of the Right; Col Jean-Gaspard Dichat de Toisinge	Giulay Freikorps	0	?
2nd Division of the Right; Col Friedrich von Bellegarde	Royal Grenadier Regiment	2	0
2nd Division of the Right; Col Friedrich von Bellegarde	D'Esery Grenadier Regiment	2	0
2nd Division of the Right; Col Friedrich von Bellegarde	Varan Grenadier Regiment	2	0
2nd Division of the Right; Col Friedrich von Bellegarde	La Tour Grenadier Battalion	1	0
2nd Division of the Right; Col Friedrich von Bellegarde	Andermatt Grenadier Battalion	1	0
2nd Division of the Right; Col Friedrich von Bellegarde	Chiusan Grenadier Battalion	1	0
2nd Division of the Right; Col Friedrich von Bellegarde	Mondovi Infantry Regiment	2	0
2nd Line Austrians; GM Giovanni Marchese di Provera	Belgiojoso Infantry Regiment Nr. 44	2	0
2nd Line Austrians; GM Giovanni Marchese di Provera	Schmidtfeld Infantry Regiment Nr. 48	2	0
2nd Line Austrians; GM Giovanni Marchese di Provera	Garrison Infantry Regiment (Note: The Austrians had the 1st and 2nd Garrison Regiments (Pivka, p. 82). The Nafziger order of battle did not specify to which one this unit belonged.)	1	0
2nd Line Austrians; GM Giovanni Marchese di Provera	Strassoldo Regiment Grenadiers	0	2
2nd Line Austrians; GM Giovanni Marchese di Provera	Giulay Freikorps	2	0
2nd Line Austrians; GM Giovanni Marchese di Provera	Staff Dragoons	0	?
2nd Line Sardinians; Col Gaspare Gaetano Hallot des Hayes, Count of Mussano	Guard Infantry Regiment	2	0
2nd Line Sardinians; Col Gaspare Gaetano Hallot des Hayes, Count of Mussano	Turin Infantry Regiment	2	0
2nd Line Sardinians; Col Gaspare Gaetano Hallot des Hayes, Count of Mussano	Asti Infantry Regiment	2	0
2nd Line Sardinians; Col Gaspare Gaetano Hallot des Hayes, Count of Mussano	Casale Infantry Regiment	2	0
2nd Line Sardinians; Col Gaspare Gaetano Hallot des Hayes, Count of Mussano	Acqui Infantry Regiment	2	0

== See also ==
- List of orders of battle

== Notes ==
Footnotes

Citations
