= 11th Hussar Regiment =

11th Hussar Regiment or 11th Hussars may refer to:

- 11th Hussars, a British regiment established in 1715
- 11th Hussars (Canada), a Canadian Militia regiment now part of the Sherbrooke Hussars
- 11th Hussar Regiment (Austria-Hungary), established in 1762
- 11th Hussar Regiment (France), established in 1793
- 2nd Westphalian Hussar Regiment, No. 11, a Prussian regiment established in 1813
