= Dragoons of the Imperial Guard =

Empress's Dragoons of the Imperial Guard
- Dragons de l'Impératrice de la Garde Impériale
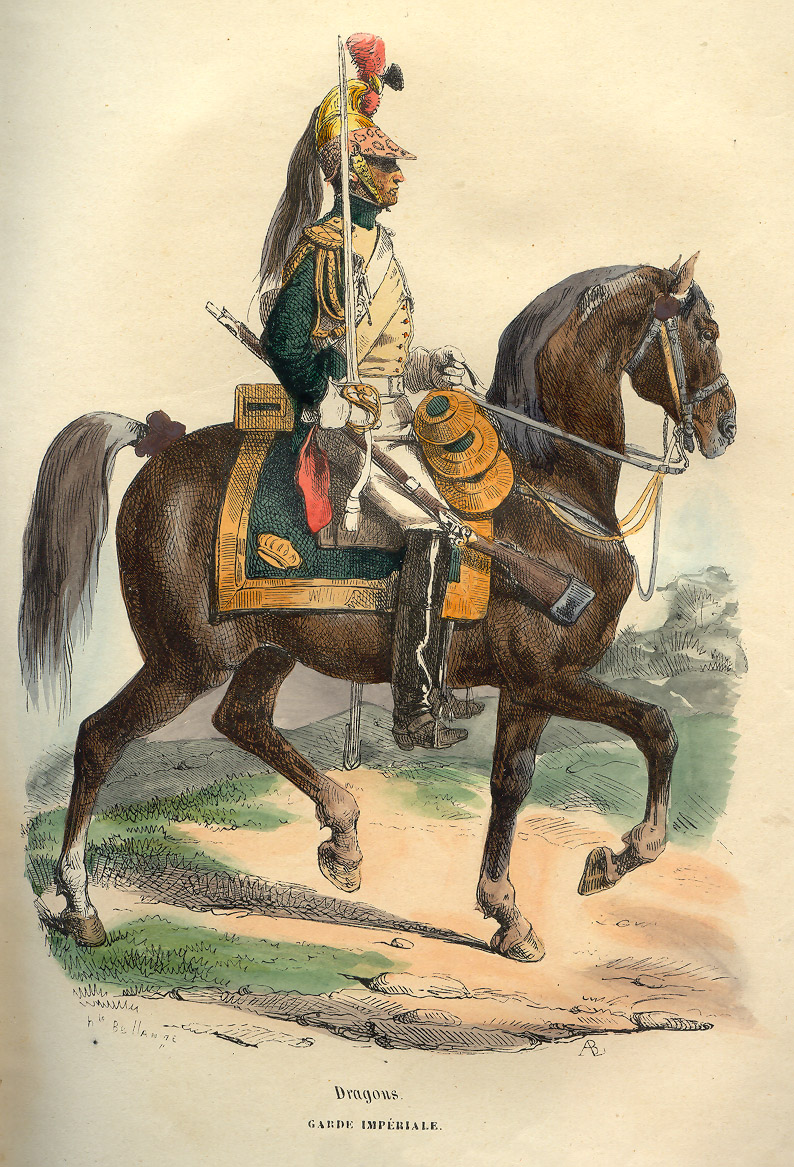
- Dragoon of the regiment by Hippolyte Bellangé
- Active: 1806 – 1814, 1815
- Country: First French Empire
- Branch: French Imperial Army
- Type: Dragoons
- Size: Regiment of 1,032 men
- Part of: Imperial Guard
- Engagements: Napoleonic Wars: Battle of Friedland; Battle of Wagram; Battle of Leipzig; Battle of Hanau; Battle of Montmirail; Battle of Waterloo

Commanders
- Notable commanders: Jean-Thomas Arrighi de Casanova; Raymond-Gaspard de Bonardi de Saint-Sulpice; Philippe Antoine d'Ornano; Louis-Michel Letort de Lorville; Laurent Hoffmayer

The Empress's Dragoons of the Imperial Guard (French: Dragons de l'Impératrice de la Garde Impériale) was a heavy cavalry unit formed by Napoleon I through the decree of April 15, 1806. The "dragoon" regiments of the line had distinguished themselves in the German campaign of 1805, and therefore Napoleon decided to reorganize the cavalry of the Guard and create within it a regiment of dragoon guards. This regiment was colloquially known as the Dragons de l'Impératrice (Empress' Dragoons), in honor of Empress Joséphine. Following the Bourbon Restoration, they were renamed as the Royal Dragoon Corps of France (Corps Royal de Dragons des France) but were disbanded shortly afterwards. The Empress' Dragoons were reformed during the Second Empire (1852-1870).

== Composition ==
The regiment was made up of three squadrons, headed by 60 officers personally selected by Napoleon. The first squadron was to have 296 men, and be made up of "vélites", while the other two were regular squadrons of 476 horsemen. To complete this new unit, each of the 30 dragoon regiments of the line provided 12 men, each with 10 years of service; the brigadier, chasseur, and dragoon line regiments provided the sous-officiers.

The unit's numbers rose to 1269 in 1807 with the addition of two new squadrons, and on December 9, 1813, it was attached to the Guard's 3rd regiment of éclaireurs.

== Campaigns ==
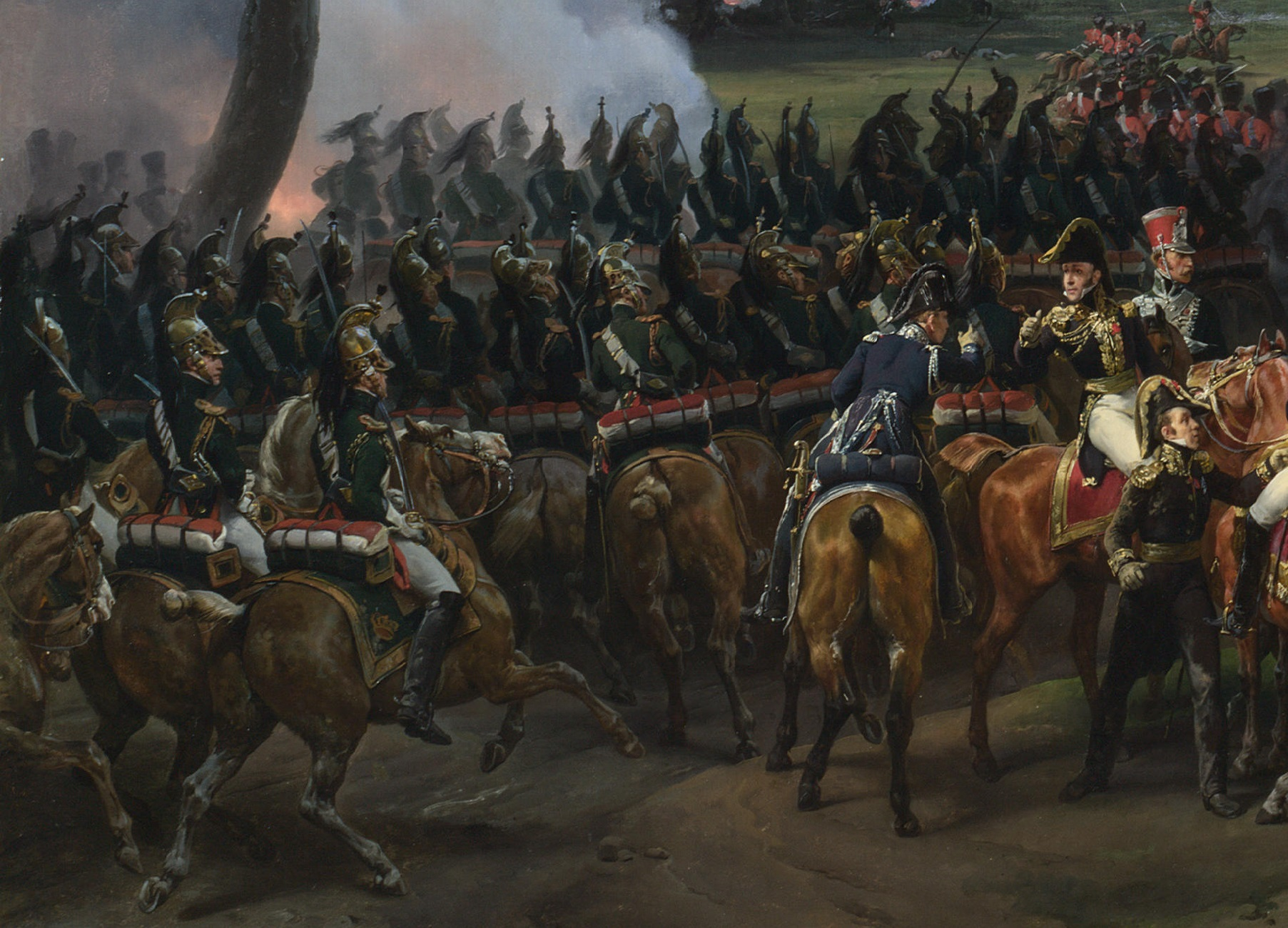
The Empress Dragoons at the Battle of Hanau

The Dragons de la Garde Imperiale distinguished themselves at the Battle of Friedland (1807), and at the Battle of Wagram (1809). They suffered heavy losses at the Battle of Maloyaroslavets and at the battle of Berezina (1812). They participated in the Battle of Leipzig and Hanau (1813) and captured 18 guns at the Battle of Saint-Dizier (1814). Their last battle was Marshal Ney's charge at Waterloo (1815).

== Uniform ==
The dragoons' uniform and weaponry was the same as those of the Guard's horse grenadiers, only in green rather than blue, and (in place of the bonnet à poil) a copper dragoon helmet with a hanging mane in the Neo-Greek Minerve style, with a red plume.

The trumpeters wore a light blue tunic with white lapels and crimson turn backs and collar. The mane on their helmets was white and the plume was light blue. They rode grey horses. They also had a white uniform for parade, consisting of a white coat with light blue lapels and collar lined with gold.

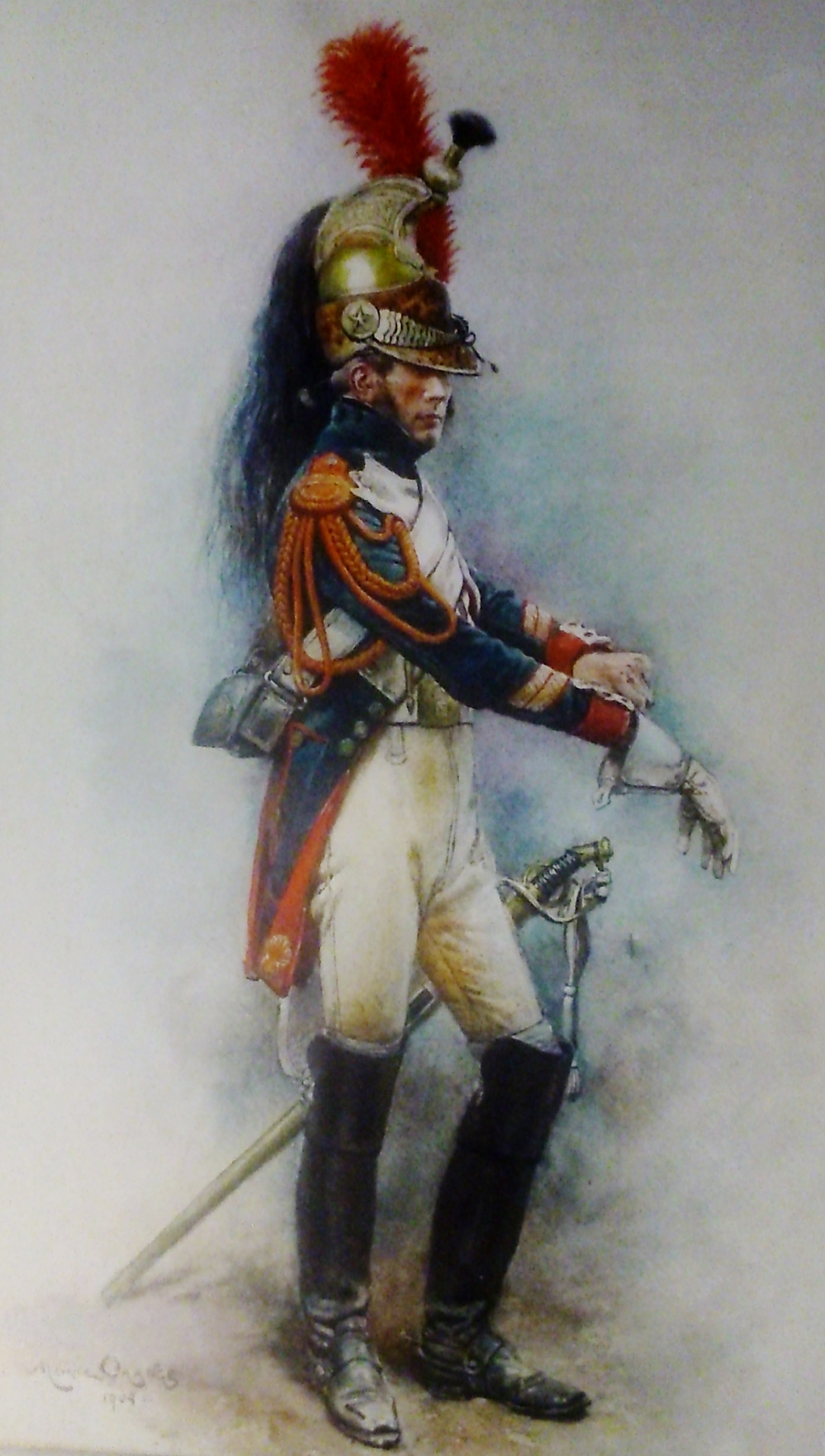
Maréchal des logis (cavalry sergeant) of the Dragoon Guards

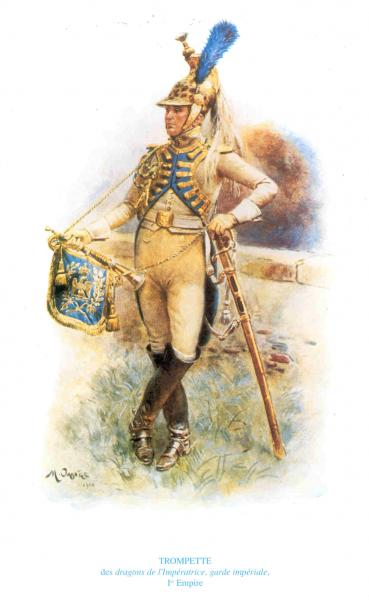
Trumpeter in parade dress

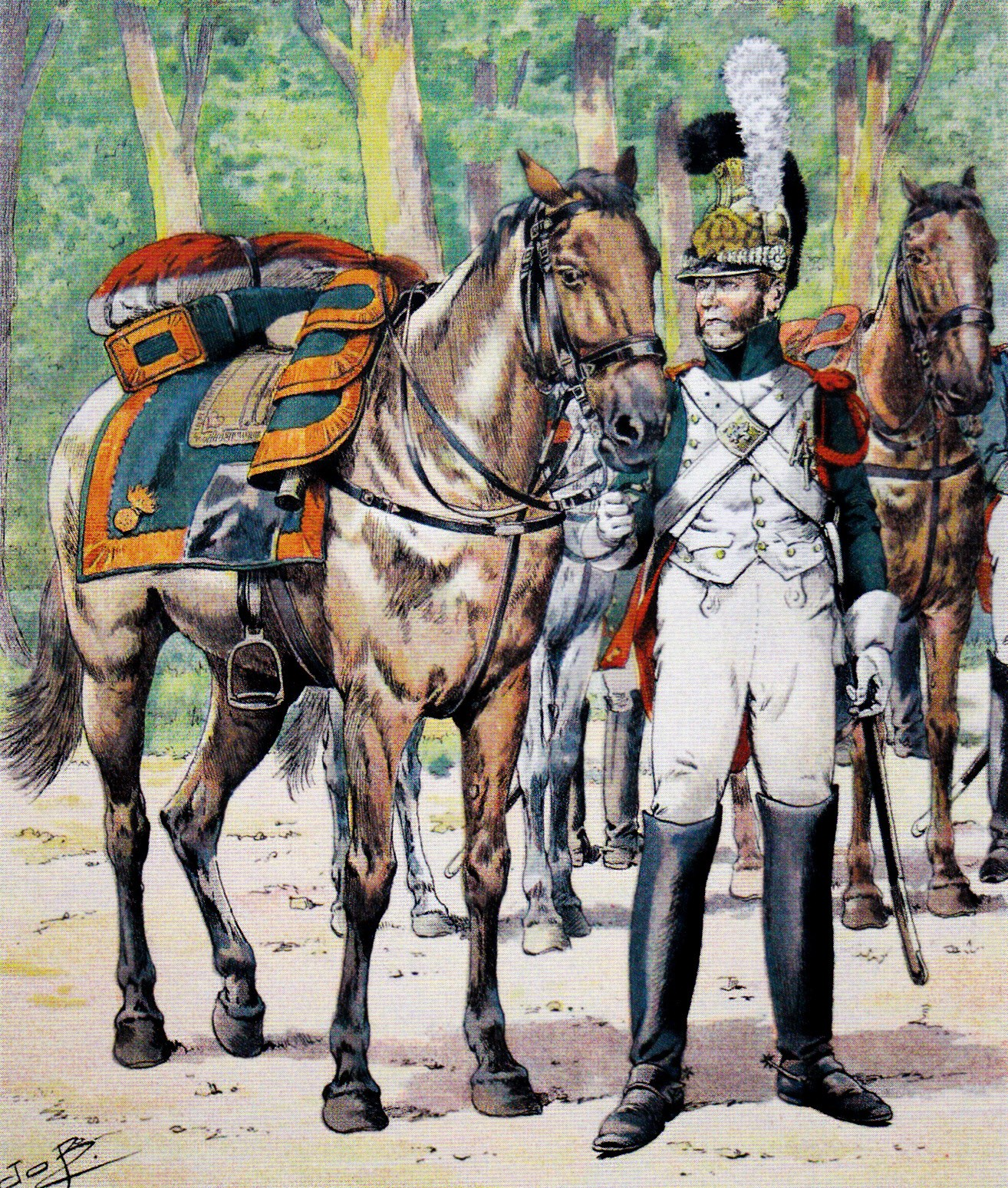
Dragoon of the Corps royal des dragons de France during the Bourbon Restoration

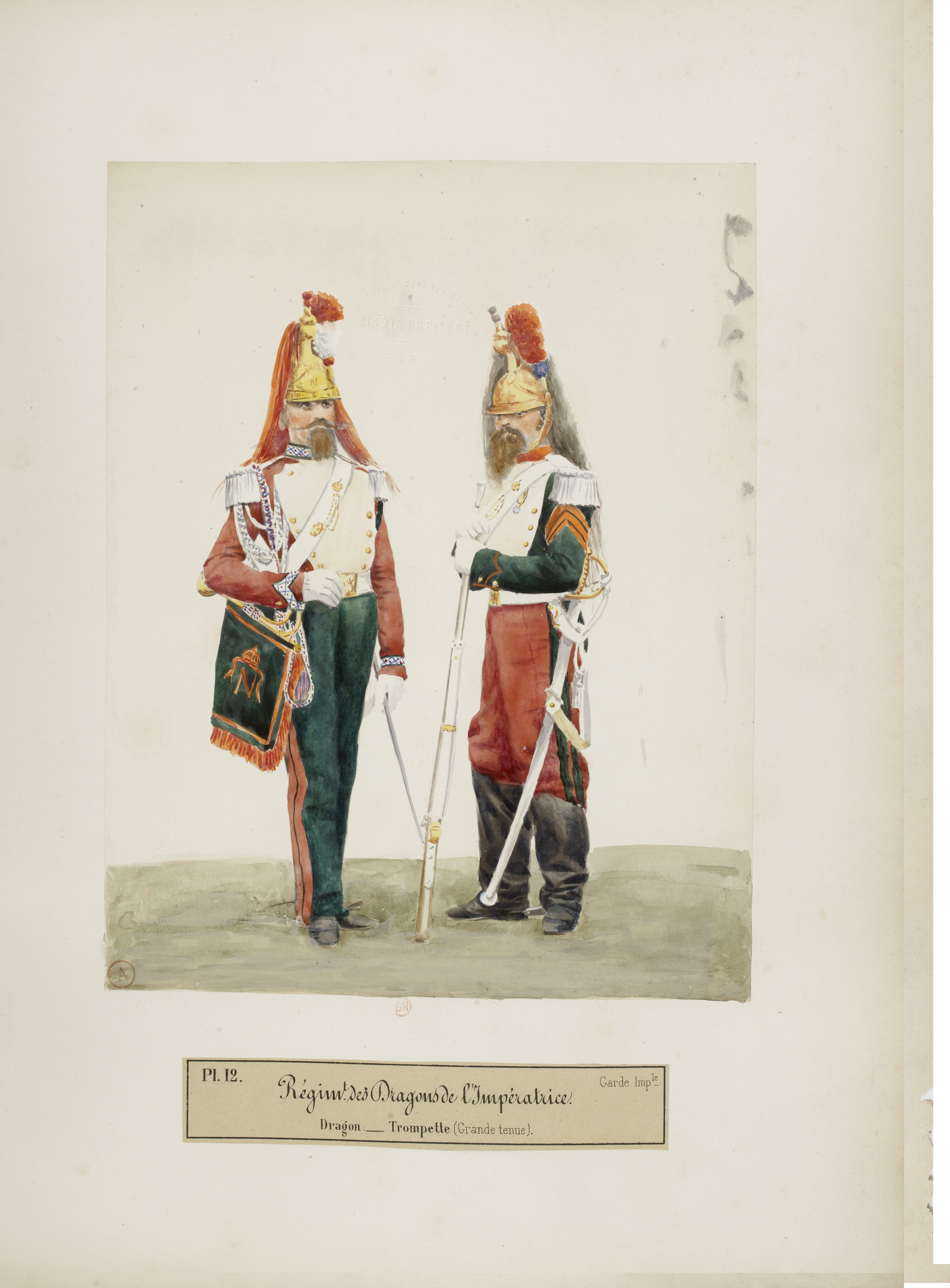
Trumpeter (left) and Empress dragoon (right) during the French Second Empire

The Dragoon Guards wore green coats with white lapels and red turnbacks. They also wore aurore (light orange) aiguillettes and epaulettes. They wore brass helmets with a long black mane, a simulated leopard fur turban and a red plume (white plume for the highest officers). They rode chestnut horses.
