= Jean-Gaspard Dichat de Toisinge =

Sardinian general

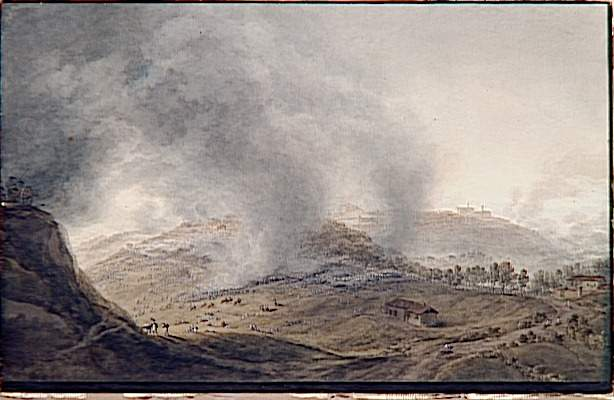
- Dichat was killed while leading his troops at the Battle of Mondovì on 21 April 1796. This painting shows the fighting at the Brichetto position near Mondovì.
- Born: 13 August 1740; Chambéry, Duchy of Savoy
- Died: 21 April 1796 (aged 55); Mondovi, Kingdom of Sardinia
- Military career
- Allegiance: Kingdom of Sardinia
- Branch: Infantry
- Service years: 1759–1796
- Rank: Brigadier General
- Conflicts: War of the First Coalition; First Battle of Saorgio; Second Battle of Saorgio; Battle of Loano; Battle of San Michele; Battle of Mondovì †

Jean-Gaspard Dichat de Toisinge (13 August 1740 – 21 April 1796) became a general officer in the service of the Kingdom of Sardinia-Piedmont during the War of the First Coalition. Born in the Duchy of Savoy into a distinguished family, he entered the Sardinian army in 1759 and advanced in rank in the peacetime army. After the outbreak of war, he was promoted to lieutenant colonel of the Aosta Infantry Regiment in 1793. That year he became commander of a provisional regiment of grenadiers. In early 1796 he was promoted colonel and later led a division. After another promotion to general officer, he fought against Napoleon Bonaparte's French army at the battles of San Michele and Mondovì and was killed in the latter action.

== Early career ==
Jean-Gaspard Dichat de Toisinge was born on 13 August 1740 at Chambéry in the Duchy of Savoy in what is now in the department of Savoie in France. He was baptized on 22 August in the church at Saint-Léger. His parents were Pierre-Antoine Dichat and Rose Ginodi. In 1740, his father, who was a judge, was raised to the nobility with the title Seigneur de Toisinge. The village of Toisinge was near Bonneville. On 26 April 1749, his father was appointed senator when Savoy was returned to the Kingdom of Sardinia after being occupied by Spanish troops for seven years. Charles, the older brother of Jean-Gaspard, became a tax-lawyer in 1762 and was appointed senator in 1782.

On 20 April 1759, Jean-Gaspard Dichat joined the Fusilier Regiment in the Royal Sardinian Army as a cadet. He was promoted alfiere or ensign in the same regiment on 7 March 1763. As alfiere, he transferred to the grenadier companies on 29 June 1768. He was elevated in rank to lieutenant on 16 May 1769. The Fusiliers became the Aosta Infantry Regiment on 16 September 1774. Dichat was appointed captain-lieutenant on 20 November 1774 and captain on 17 May 1778. He became a captain of grenadiers on 24 June 1786. He was promoted major in the Aosta Regiment on 5 October 1787.

== War with France ==
=== 1792–1795 ===
By a quirk of geography, the Kingdom of Sardinia possessed two regions that were on the French side of the Alps. The Duchy of Savoy and the County of Nice had long been coveted by France. Since these regions were on the west side of the mountains, they were difficult to defend in case of a war with a major power like France. In order for a minor power like Sardinia to defend against France, it needed to ally itself with a major power like Habsburg Austria which controlled the nearby Duchy of Milan. However, Austria was in the process of gobbling up large parts of Poland, so it was an ally that could not completely be trusted. King Victor Amadeus III finally obtained a pact with Austria on 22 September 1792, but it was too late. The French invasion of Savoy began on the night of 21 September 1792 and by 24 September, French troops occupied Chambéry without encountering much resistance. A second French invasion force crossed the Var River on 29 September and occupied Nice.

Dichat's older brother Charles apparently made an accommodation with the French First Republic. One month after the French occupation of Chambéry, Charles took an oath to maintain, "the freedom and equality of the sovereign people", at the Chambéry cathedral. However, Jean-Gaspard Dichat remained true to his Sardinian king. He was promoted lieutenant colonel on 24 July 1793, still in the Aosta Regiment. On 12 February 1793, he was assigned to lead a provisional regiment formed from the 8th and 9th Grenadier Battalions. Grenadier battalions were formed by detaching the elite companies from existing regiments. (Note: His assignment to lead a provisional regiment before his promotion to lieutenant colonel, looks like the year of promotion may be a typographical error for 1792.)

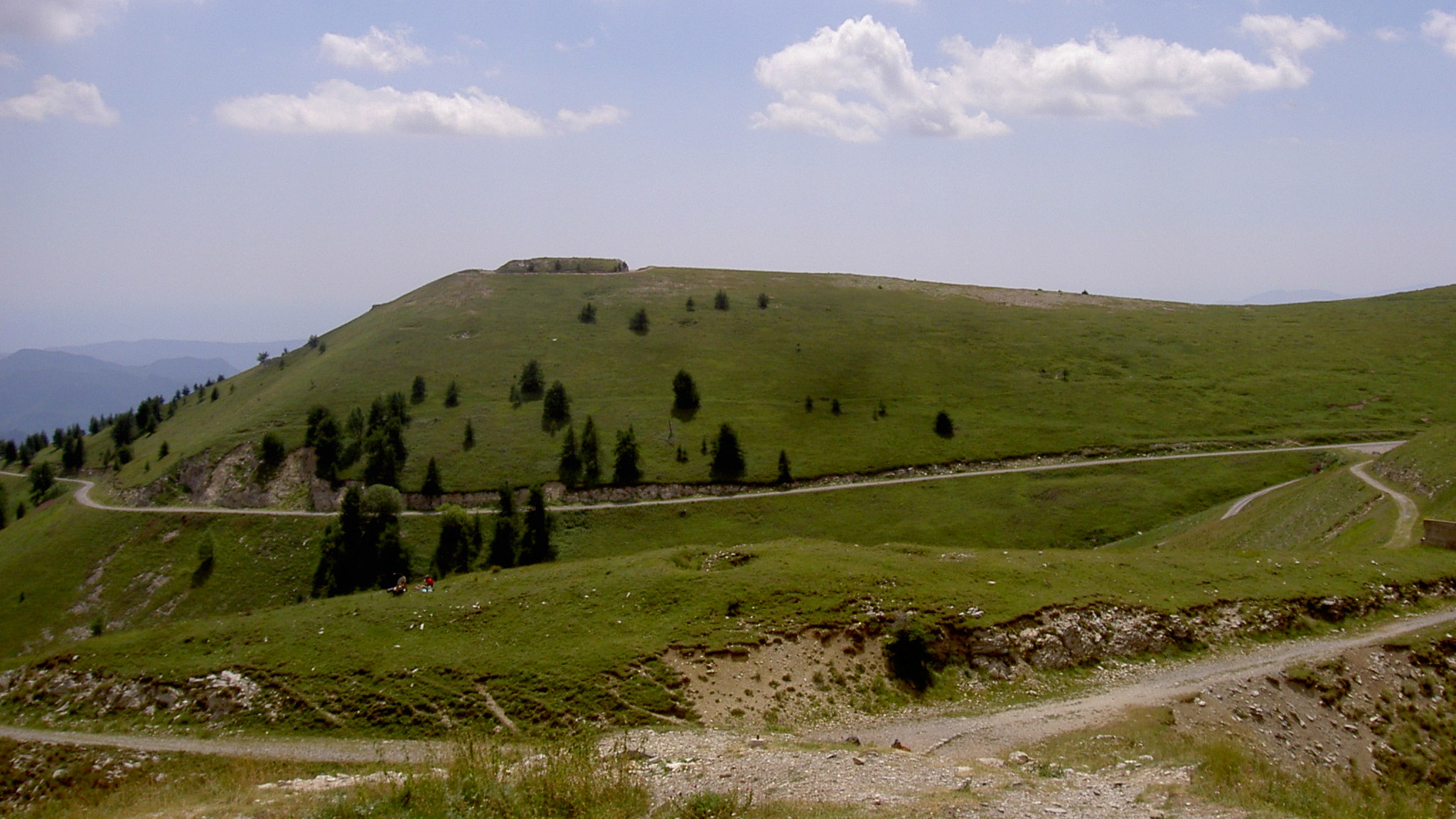
The Authion Massif

An order of battle of 30 March 1793 placed the 8th Grenadier Battalion in the Left Division under General Pernigotti at Breil-sur-Roya and the 9th Grenadier Battalion in the Right Division under General Dellera at Fontan. Both battalions were approximately 400 strong and both divisions were subordinate to General Charles-François Thaon, Count of Saint-André. In the First Battle of Saorgio on 8–12 June 1793, French attacks on Mont-Authion and the Col de Raus were repulsed with serious losses. On 8 June, the 8th Grenadier Battalion served with the Left Division under the Count of Saint-André at Camp Brouis while the 9th Grenadier Battalion was assigned to the Right Division under General Michelangelo Alessandro Colli-Marchi at Camp Fromagnie near Mont-Authion.

In September 1793, the Sardinian army mounted a campaign to recapture the County of Nice. The Sardinian effort was frustrated when snow ended the campaigning season. The Second Battle of Saorgio was fought in April 1794. The 8th and 9th Grenadiers, together 782 men strong, were stationed at Mondovì in May 1794, but whether they were engaged at Saorgio in April is unclear. Since Dichat's grenadiers served in the Ligurian Alps in May 1794, and Dichat led a division in the same area in January 1796, he may have fought in the Battle of Loano in November 1795.

=== 1796 ===
On 6 January 1796, Dichat was promoted colonel. In January, Dichat commanded the First Division of the Right. This formation included the Dichat Grenadier Regiment (510 men), Oneille Regiment (480 men), Bellegarde Legion (208 men), Buriasque Chasseurs (80 men), Francioni Chasseurs (75 men), Pandini Chasseurs (76 men), St. Ambroise Chasseurs (?), Gyulai Croatians (?), 6 grenadier and chasseur companies from the Light Legion (154 men), and an unspecified militia unit. (Note: The order of battle is from January 1796, but strengths are from the February 1796 returns.) On 26 March 1796 Dichat was appointed brigadier general. On 4 April 1796, his command was called the Advanced Guard on the Tanaro. This was composed of 2 battalions of the Light Legion, 2 companies of the Turin Regiment, 6 grenadier and chasseur companies from the Light Legion, and 11 independent companies of chasseurs.

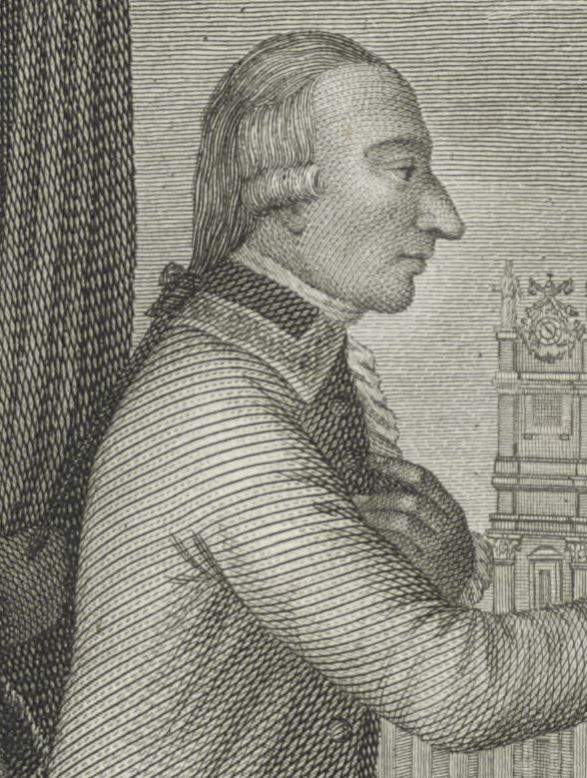
Michelangelo Colli

On 19 April 1796, Colli, who was then in overall Sardinian command, placed 8,000 soldiers and 15 guns under Dichat's tactical control and ordered him to defend the position of San Michele (or La Bicocca). The French Army of Italy under Bonaparte had just captured Ceva and was moving westward. Dichat's troops were arrayed behind the Corsaglia River, which flows north into the Tanaro River. Bonaparte ordered Charles-Pierre Augereau's division to attack the northern flank where the two rivers joined, while Jean-Mathieu-Philibert Sérurier's division attacked the southern flank at San Michele. High water defeated Augereau, while Sérurier's initial attack on the San Michele bridge was stopped by intense artillery fire.

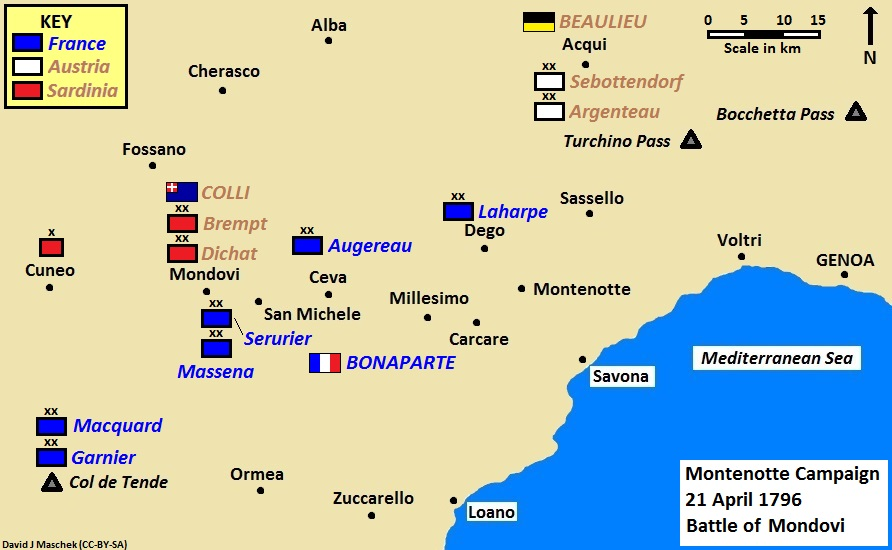
Battle of Mondovì strategic situation

One of Sérurier's brigades found an unguarded footbridge, crossed over, and began moving up the west bank of the Corsaglia. The Sardinians soldiers panicked, allowing a second French brigade to force its way across the bridge at San Michele. In the confusion, Colli barely escaped while Dichat was captured, but he bribed his captor to free him. The hungry French soldiers soon went out of control and began plundering the town. A company of 75 Swiss mercenaries was overlooked by the French; it counterattacked and began to overwhelm the rioting French soldiers. Colli rallied his Sardinians at La Bicocca and organized a counterattack. Together with the Swiss, this effort routed the French. The French sustained about 600 casualties while the Sardinians lost only half as many.

Bonaparte spent 19 and 20 April resting his French troops, restoring discipline, bringing up reinforcements, and switching his army's supply line from the Colle di Cadibona to the nearer Tanaro valley. Though Colli won a minor victory, he feared that if he stood his ground, his army would be destroyed. On the evening of 20 April, Colli ordered the Sardinian army to retreat in two columns. After finding the bridge at San Michele broken at midnight, French scouts found that the Sardinians had decamped. In the Battle of Mondovì on 21 April, Sérurier's division rapidly pursued and drove the Sardinian rearguard back to Vicoforte, where Colli was trying to organize a defensive position. Many Sardinian troops proved to be unsteady and several units fled at the first fire, but the troops led by Dichat held their ground for a time. However, Dichat was killed, the morale of the Sardinian army collapsed, and a rout ensued. A week later, the Kingdom of Sardinia withdrew from the First Coalition at the Armistice of Cherasco.

== Notes ==
Footnotes

Citations
