= Louis-Michel Letort de Lorville =

French general (1773–1815)

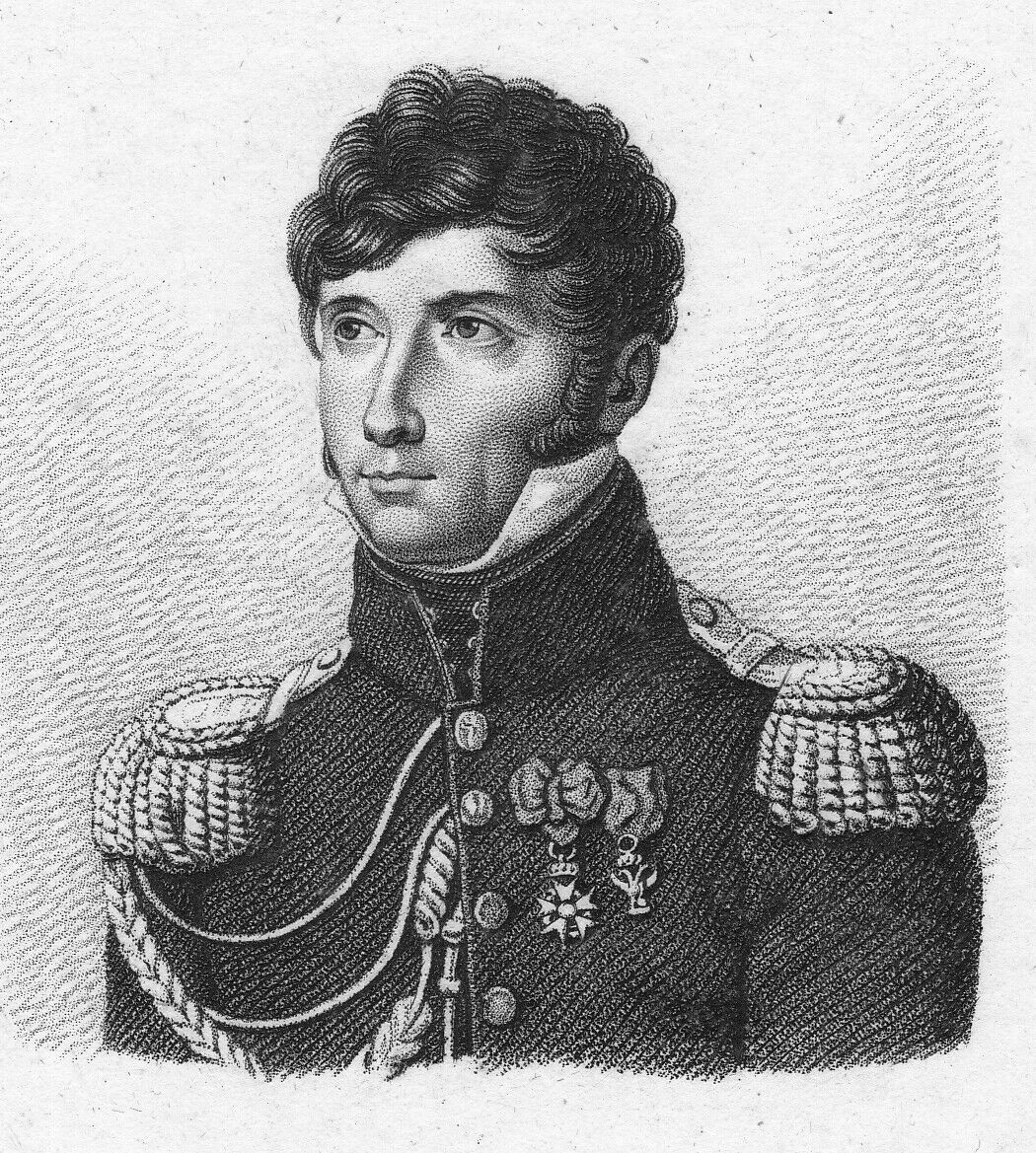
- Born: 29 August 1773; Saint-Germain-en-Laye, France
- Died: 17 June 1815 (aged 41); Gilly, Belgium
- Military career
- Allegiance: France
- Branch: French Army
- Service years: 1791–1815
- Rank: Général de brigade
- Conflicts: French Revolutionary Wars; Napoleonic Wars

Louis-Michel Letort de Lorville (French pronunciation: [lwi miʃɛl lətɔʁ də lɔʁvil]; 29 August 1773 – 17 June 1815) was a French general of the Napoleonic Wars. He was made a baron de l'Empire on 9 September 1810, général de brigade on 30 January 1813, and acted as aide de camp to Napoleon himself. He fought with distinction in the first French Revolutionary Wars and became, under the First French Empire, a major in the Dragoons of the Imperial Guard.

== Life ==
Volunteering in 1791, he fought at the battle of Jemappes (and Neerwinden). Wounded in Italy in 1799, he continued on a military career in Austria, then Prussia, Poland and Russia despite receiving a new wound at the battle of Jena.

Distinguishing himself in 1808 at the battle of Burgos, his service in Russia (notably in the battle of Malojaroslawitz) won him promotion to général de brigade. Wounded and distinguished again at Wachau, he still took part in the battle of Hanau, where his horse was killed under him. On 2 February 1814, he distinguished himself again at the Battle of Montmirail, and the following day was made général de division. On 19 March that same year, he impetuously attacked the enemy rearguard, captured a group of pontoons and closely pursued the Allies.

During the Hundred Days, general Letort offered his services to Napoleon, who accepted and put him in command of the dragoons of the Imperial Guard. On 15 June, at the moment Napoleon gave the order to attack elements of Ziethen's Prussian I Corps (hidden in the woods of Fleurus), the Prussians began to retire. Impatient to see this corps escaping, Napoleon ordered his aide-de-camp Letort to take four service squadrons of the Guard and charge the enemy vanguard. Letort immediately charged in pursuit of the Prussian infantry, pushing off two infantry squares and wrecking one whole regiment, but fell mortally wounded by a bullet in the lower stomach and died two days later. His name is engraved on the north face of the Arc de Triomphe.

== Sources ==
- Mullié, Charles (1852). "Letort (Louis-Michel, baron)" . Biographie des célébrités militaires des armées de terre et de mer de 1789 à 1850 (in French). Paris: Poignavant et Compagnie.
