= Germanic Legion =

Military unit of the French Revolutionary Wars

The Germanic Legion was a military unit of the French Revolutionary Wars, theoretically made up of German volunteers fighting under French command. It was set up in September 1792 and dissolved on 22 June 1793.

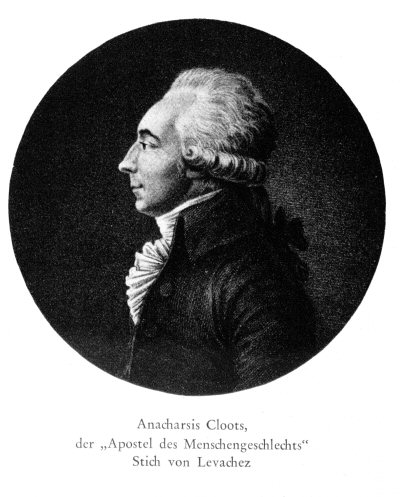
Baron de Cloots engraved by Levachez

== History ==
The idea of forming an army corps from pro-Revolutionary German volunteers was born in summer 1792. It was most probably the example of the légion des Belges and légion des Liégeois unis which gave the Prussian Anachasis Cloots and Saxon Saiffert, both resident in Paris, the idea of such a Legion, at first to be called a Prussian Legion then a Vandal Legion. It rapidly hit recruitment problems, however, since there few expatriate Germans in France were in favour of the Revolution. Cloots thus had the idea of recruiting deserters from the Austrian and Prussian armies. A decree of the Legislative Assembly of August 1792 granted such deserters a pension for life of 100 livres should they join the unit. Cloots and his military adjutants colonels Dambach and van Hayden, however, felt the Germanic Legion must not just become a refuge for deserters but the "core of future German liberty". Saiffert composed a hymn with the chorus "Arise ye oppressed people; stand up, you who speak the same language, be free like the French" (« Lève-toi peuple opprimé ; debout, vous qui parlez la même langue, soyez libres comme les Français »).

A "capitulation" (i.e. a treaty) was concluded by the future legion's leaders and the Minister for War, stipulating that the Legion would never be deployed against German troops and that no Frenchman would be accepted into it. The Legion's existence was officialised by a law of 4 September 1792, but the capitulation was very soon violated, with Frenchman being admitted into the Legion (mainly Germanophone Alsatians and Lorrainians). Marceau and Augereau also served in it.

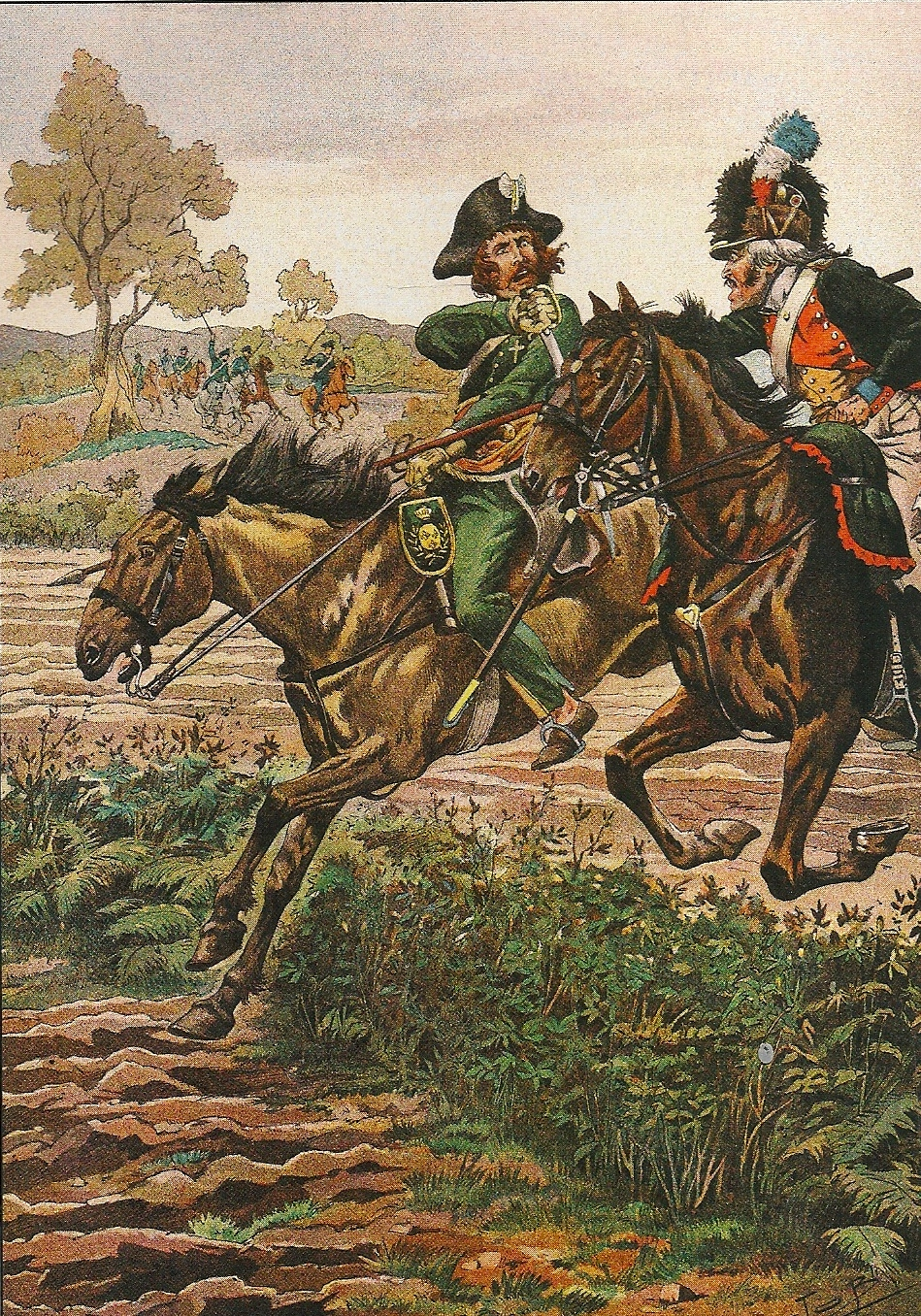
Piquier of the Germanic Legion (right) with lance, fighting against Vendée loyalist cavalryman

At first used to re-establish order in the Chartres region, it was then sent to the Ardennes front, again breaching the capitulation. After the outbreak of the War in the Vendée, the Legion was deployed to Western France, where it carried out the fusillades de Nantes. At the same moment its leaders were accused of "despotism" and certain officers such as Marceau were relieved by the représentants en mission to the Vendée. More and more members of the Legion switched to the vendéen side and the legion was finally disbanded on 22 June 1793, with its members redistributed into French units.

== Organisation (according to Richard Knötel, 1895) ==
The cavalry of the legion theoretically consisted of 4 squadrons light cuirassiers, each squadron composed of two companies of 62 troopers including officers, and 4 squadrons of dragoons, called mounted pioneers or piquiers à cheval in the same number. Infantry comprised the first bataillon of so-called arquebusers with four companies of 120 troopers each, and the second bataillon of light infantry and Chasseurs à pied in the same strength. The legion also comprised an artillery formation.

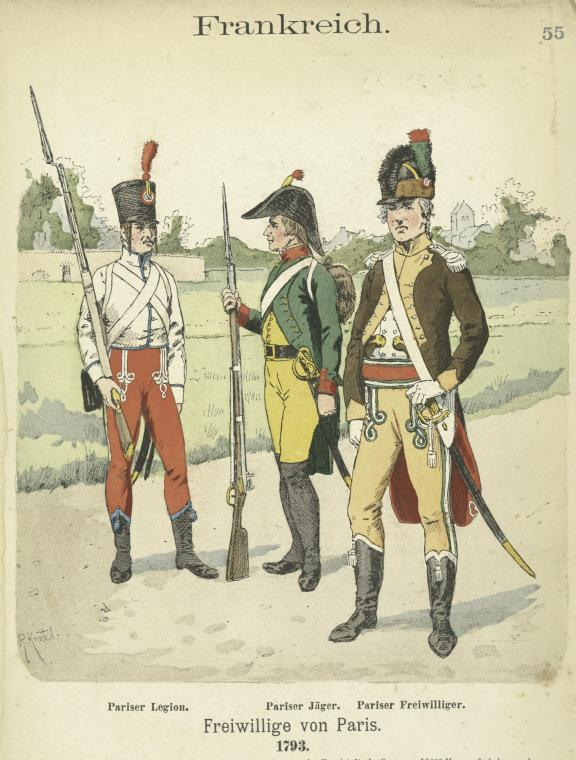
In describing the uniforms of the Germanic Legion, Knötel referred to the type of French revolutionary shown on the right

== Uniforms (according to Knötel, 1895) ==
- All buttons showed the words Liberté Egalité in the center, and the words Légion des Germains on the perimeter.
- Light cuirassiers had a buff-colored tunic, high boots, and wore a helmet with plume.
- Mounted pioneers wore a uniform with red lining, white collar, red lapels and light-blue cuffs with red button facing. Buff-colored trousers and waistcoat, the latter with one row of white buttons. Headgear was a casquette with tricolored plume. Weapons were a lance without flag, saber and carbine.
- Arquebusiers. Bottle green tunic with black lining and lapels, white collar, light-blue cuffs. Green trousers, black gaiters. Black waistcoat with two rows of yellow buttons. Two epaulettes mottled in three colors. Casquette as above.
- Light infantry had dark green tunics with white lining and collar, red lapels, light-blue cuffs with red rims. Waistcoat, with two rows of yellow buttons, and trousers were buff-colored. Black gaiters. Casquette as above.
- Artillery uniform all dark-blue, red lining and rims, light-blue cuffs, same buttons as light infantry. Red epaulettes. Casquette as above.
- According to the present article in French and other sources, the cavalry of the legion also comprised a hussar squadron, and was incorporated into the 11th Hussar Regiment.
