= Hippolyte Bellangé =

French painter

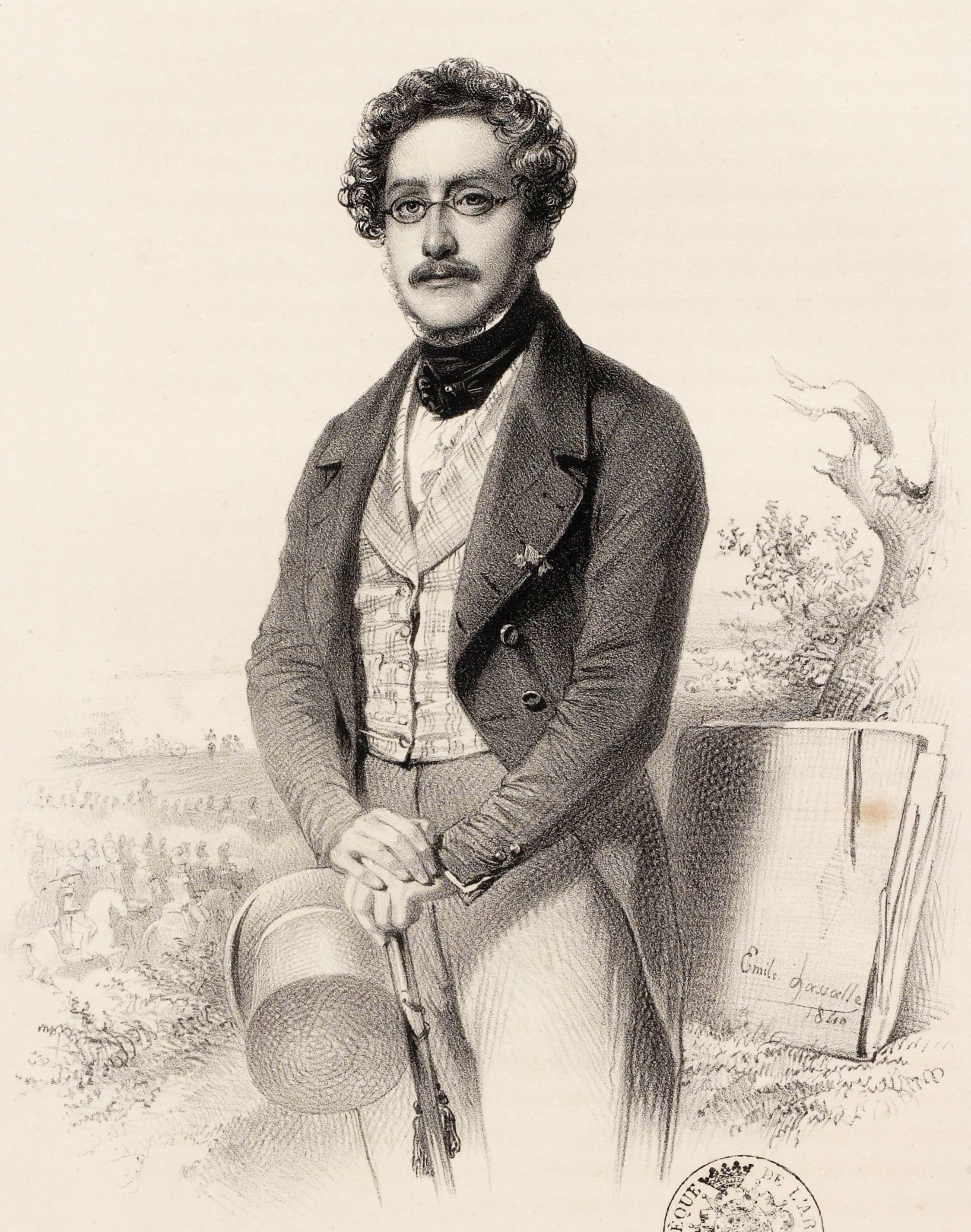
- Born: Joseph Louis Hippolyte Bellangé; 17 January 1800; Paris
- Died: 10 April 1866 (aged 66); Paris
- Known for: battle painter

Joseph Louis Hippolyte Bellangé (17 January 1800 – 10 April 1866) was a French battle painter and printmaker. His art was influenced by the wars of the first Napoleon, and while a youth, he produced several military drawings in lithography. He afterwards pursued his systematic studies under Gros, and with the exception of some portraits, devoted himself exclusively to battle-pieces. In 1824, he received a second class medal for a historical picture, and in 1834 the decoration of the Legion of Honour, of which Order he was made an officer in 1861. He also gained a prize at the Paris Universal Exhibition of 1855.

== Selected works ==
- Battle Scene (circa 1825)
- The Entry of the French into Mons.
- The Day after the Battle of Jemappes.
- The Passage of the Mincio.
- The Battle of Fleurus (at Versailles).
- A Duel in the Time of Richelieu.
- The Battle of Wagram (at Versailles).
- The Taking of Teniah de Muzaia (in Salon of 1841, and now at Versailles).
- Taking Russian Ambuscades (1857).
- Episode of the Taking of the Malakoff (1859).
- The Two Friends — Sebastopol, 1855 (exhibited in Salon of 1861, at London in 1862, and at Paris in 1867).
- The Soldier's Farewell (in Leipsic Museum).
- Military Review Under the Empire (1810) (aka Showing the Troops; 1862; in Louvre, not on display)
- The Soldier's Return (in Leipsic Museum).
- The Return of Napoleon from Elba (in Salon of 1864, and Paris Exhibition, 1867).
- The Cuirassiers at Waterloo (in Salon of 1865, and Paris Exhibition, 1867).
- The Guard dies (in Salon of 1866, and Paris Exhibition, 1867 — his last work).

== Gallery ==
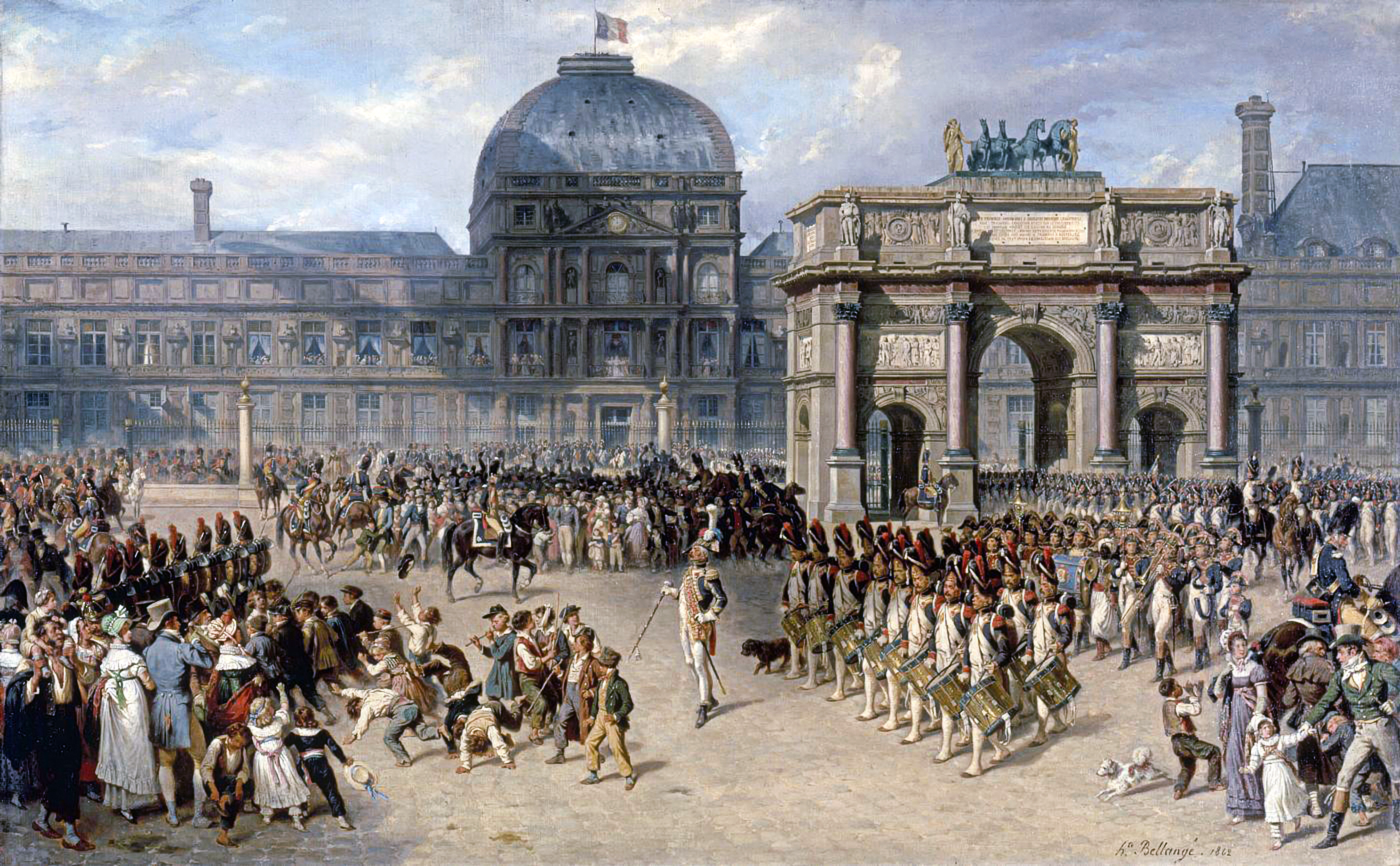
Showing the troops, by Bellangé and Adrien Dauzats from 1862. Now at the Louvre.

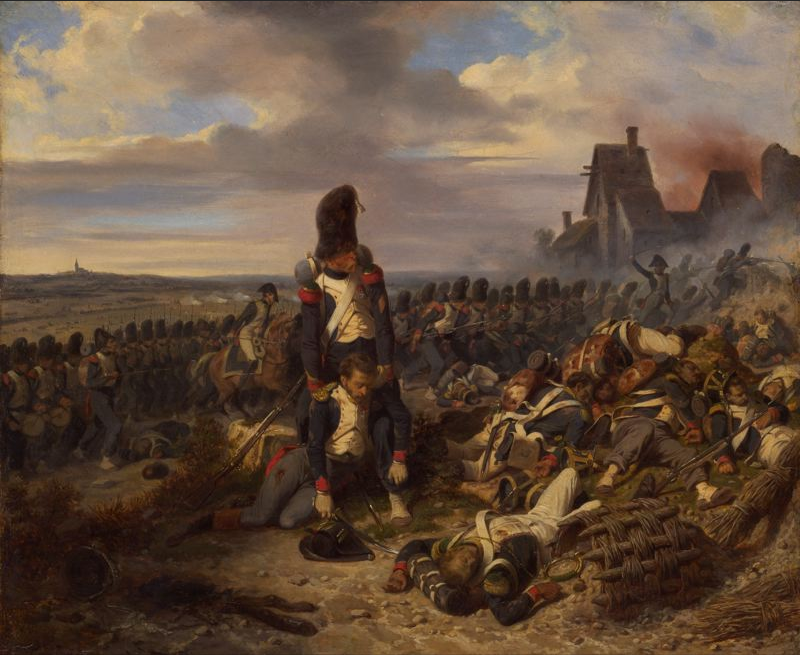
Battle scene, by Hippolyte Bellangé, at the Art Institute of Chicago

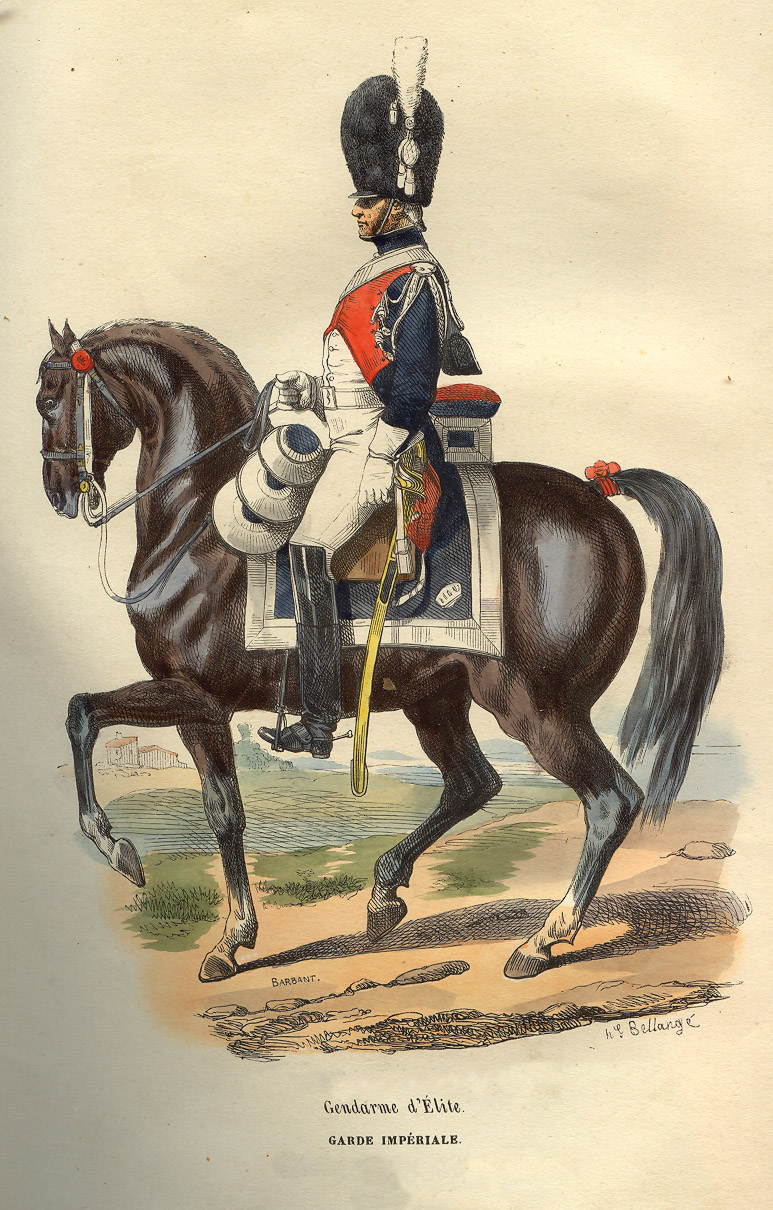
Elite Gendarme from the Imperial Guard of the Grande Armée, from the book, by Paul-Mathieu Laurent de l'Ardêche, Histoire de Napoléon, 1843.

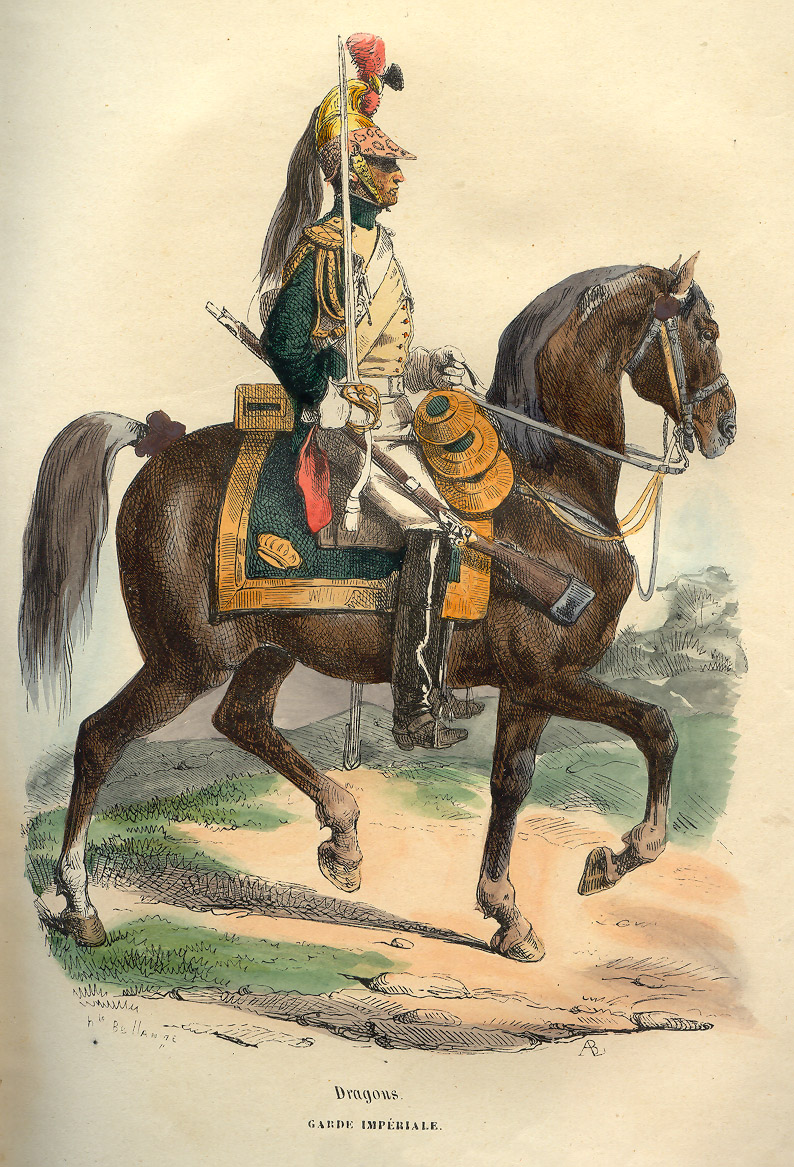
Empress' Dragoon, 1843
