= 11th Hussar Regiment (France) =

- The regimental standard
- Active: 1793-1814, 1873-1919
- Country: France
- Branch: French Army
- Type: Regiment of Hussars
- Role: Light cavalry
- Garrison/HQ: Algeria 1874. Tunisia 1881-1883. Belfort 1883-1900. Tarascon 1900-1914.
- Engagements: French Revolutionary Wars, Napoleonic Wars, First World War
- Battle honours: Marengo 1800; Austerlitz 1805; Stralsund 1807; Wagram 1809; Flandres 1914; L'escaut 1918

The 11th Hussar Regiment (11e régiment de hussards) was a hussar regiment in the French Army.

== History ==
=== The Revolutionary Wars ===
It was raised on 28 July 1793 from personnel of the 24th Mounted Chasseurs Regiment. Also added were two volunteer regiments, the Germanic Legion, and the second squadron of the Hussards de la Liberté. Jacques-Philippe Avice was the regiment's chef de brigade.

The regiment fought in the War of the First Coalition, participating in the Second Battle of Wissembourg, the War of the Pyrenees, the War in the Vendée, the Battle of Friedberg, the Siege of Kehl and the Italian Campaigns of the War of the Second Coalition.

An early member of the regiment was Pierre David de Colbert-Chabanais.

=== The Napoleonic Wars ===
On 24 September 1803 it was renamed the 29th Dragoon Regiment.

A new 11th Hussars was set up on 18 August 1810 by splitting off personnel from the 2nd Dutch Hussars Regiment (régiment des hussards hollandais) within the French Army.

The new unit participated in the Russian Campaign in 1812 and the Battle of Leipzig in 1813.

It was disbanded in 1814 upon the Bourbon Restoration.

=== Renewal ===
A third 11th Hussar Regiment was set up at Sidi Bel Abbès in 1873, formed of one squadron from the 1st Chasseurs and other squadrons from the 1st, 3rd and 8th Hussars.

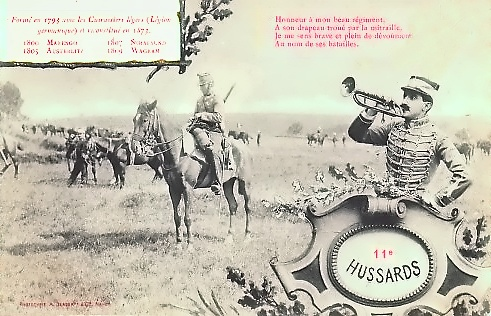
A 1905 postcard showing the unit

This regiment was disbanded in 1919, after serving in the First World War.

== Uniform ==
Hackle: grey
Cord: white
Collar: grey
Dolman: green
Pelisse: green
Side stripe: grey
Braid: white
Breeches: grey

== Bibliography ==
- Broughton, Tony (May 2000). "French Hussar Regiments and the Colonels who Led Them: 1792 to 1815". The Napoleon Series.
- Lassus, H. de. Historique du 11e Régiment de Hussards. Impr. de J. Céas et fils, 1890.
- Michel-Bechet, J-J. (1913). Historique sommaire du 11e régiment de hussards. F. Séguin.
