= Logistic Battalion "Granatieri di Sardegna" =

Inactive Italian Army brigade logistics unit

- Battaglione Logistico "Granatieri di Sardegna"
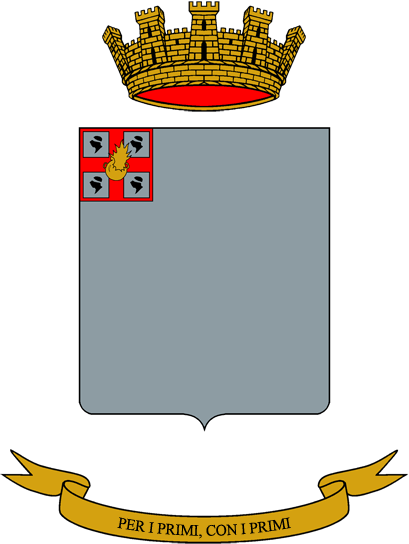
- Battalion coat of arms
- Active: 1 Oct. 1975 — 2002
- Country: Italy
- Branch: Italian Army
- Type: Military logistics
- Part of: Mechanized Brigade "Granatieri di Sardegna"
- Garrison/HQ: Civitavecchia
- Motto(s): "Per i primi, con i primi"
- Anniversaries: 22 May 1916 - Battle of Asiago

Insignia
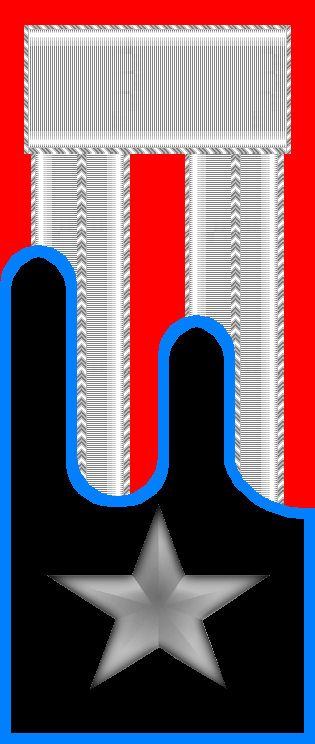
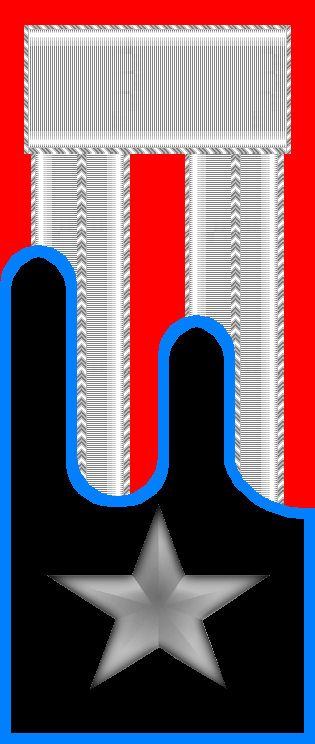
- Unit gorget patches

The Logistic Battalion "Granatieri di Sardegna" (Italian: Battaglione Logistico "Granatieri di Sardegna") is an inactive military logistics battalion of the Italian Army, which was assigned to the Mechanized Brigade "Granatieri di Sardegna". The battalion's anniversary falls, as for all units of the Italian Army's Transport and Materiel Corps, on 22 May, the anniversary of the Royal Italian Army's first major use of automobiles to transport reinforcements to the Asiago plateau to counter the Austro-Hungarian Asiago Offensive in May 1916.

== History ==
The battalion is the spiritual successor of the logistic units of the Royal Italian Army's 21st Infantry Division "Granatieri di Sardegna". In the evening of 8 September 1943, the Armistice of Cassibile, which ended hostilities between the Kingdom of Italy and the Anglo-American Allies, was announced by General Dwight D. Eisenhower on Radio Algiers and by Marshal Pietro Badoglio on Italian radio. Germany reacted by invading Italy and the "Granatieri di Sardegna" division defended Rome against the Germans until 10 September. The battalion is also the spiritual successor of the logistic units of the Italian Co-belligerent Army's Granatieri Division, which was active from 15 May to 1 September 1944, and of the logistic units of the Italian Army's Infantry Division "Granatieri di Sardegna", which was formed on 1 April 1948 in Rome.

=== Cold War ===
On 1 September 1956, the logistic units of the Infantry Division "Granatieri di Sardegna" were assigned to the newly formed Service Units Command "Granatieri di Sardegna" in Rome. The command consisted of a reserve medical section, a provisions section, a mobile vehicle park, a mobile workshop, and an auto unit. On 1 November 1961, the mobile vehicle park, mobile workshop, and the light workshops of the division's regiments merged to form the Resupply, Repairs, Recovery Unit "Granatieri di Sardegna".

On 1 January 1972, the Service Units Command "Granatieri di Sardegna" was reorganized as Services Grouping Command "Granatieri di Sardegna". The command consisted of a command, the Auto Unit "Granatieri di Sardegna", the Provisions Company "Granatieri di Sardegna", the Resupply, Repairs, Recovery Unit "Granatieri di Sardegna", and the reserve Medical Battalion "Granatieri di Sardegna".

As part of the 1975 army reform the Infantry Division "Granatieri di Sardegna" was split to form the Motorized Brigade "Acqui" in L'Aquila and the Mechanized Brigade "Granatieri di Sardegna" in Rome. As all of the "Granatieri di Sardegna" division's logistic units were based in L'Aquila the Service Units Command "Granatieri di Sardegna" received on 1 August 1975, the II Services Battalion "Centauro" in Civitavecchia from the Armored Division "Centauro". This battalion had been formed on 1 November 1964 to support the "Centauro" division's II Armored Brigade "Centauro" in Civitavecchia.

On 1 October 1975, the Service Units Command "Granatieri di Sardegna" assumed a new configuration and consisted afterwards of a command, a command and services platoon, the Logistic Battalion "Granatieri di Sardegna", which had been formed by reorganized the II Services Battalion "Centauro" in Civitavecchia and the parts of the Auto Unit "Granatieri di Sardegna" based in Rome, and the Logistic Battalion "Acqui", which had been formed by merging the "Granatieri di Sardegna" division's Resupply, Repairs, Recovery Unit, Auto Unit, and Provisions Company in L'Aquila. On 31 October 1976, the Service Units Command "Granatieri di Sardegna" was disbanded and the next day the two logistic battalions became autonomous units and were assigned to their respective brigades.

The Logistic Battalion "Granatieri di Sardegna" received the traditions of all preceding logistic, transport, medical, maintenance, and supply units bearing the name "Granatieri di Sardegna". The battalion consisted of a command, a command platoon, a supply and transport company, a medium workshop, and a vehicle park. At the time the battalion fielded 651 men (37 officers, 82 non-commissioned officers, and 532 soldiers).

On 12 November 1976, the President of the Italian Republic Giovanni Leone granted with decree 846 the battalion a flag.

On 1 October 1981, the battalion was reorganized and consisted afterwards of the following units:

- Logistic Battalion "Granatieri di Sardegna", in Civitavecchia
  - Command and Services Company
  - Supply Company
  - Maintenance Company
  - Medium Transport Company
  - Medical Unit (Reserve)

In 1989, the medical unit received an airmobile chirurgical team, which included helicopter-transportable operation rooms in containers.

=== Recent times ===
On 15 May 1996, the Logistic Battalion "Acqui" in L'Aquila was transferred from the Mechanized Brigade "Acqui" to the "Granatieri di Sardegna" brigade. On 30 June 1996, the companies of the Logistic Battalion "Granatieri di Sardegna" in Civitavecchia were disbanded and the battalion's flag left for L'Aquila. On the same day, the Logistic Battalion "Acqui" in L'Aquila was declared disbanded. The next day, the flag of the Logistic Battalion "Granatieri di Sardegna" arrived in L'Aquila, where the battalion was reformed with the personnel and materiel of the Logistic Battalion "Acqui". The following 3 July, the flag of the Logistic Battalion "Acqui" was transferred to the Shrine of the Flags in the Vittoriano in Rome for safekeeping. In 2002, Logistic Battalion "Granatieri di Sardegna" was disbanded and that battalion's flag was also transferred to the Shrine of the Flags in the Vittoriano in Rome for safekeeping.

== See also ==
- Military logistics
