= Logistic Battalion "Acqui" =

Inactive Italian Army brigade logistics unit

- Battaglione Logistico "Acqui"
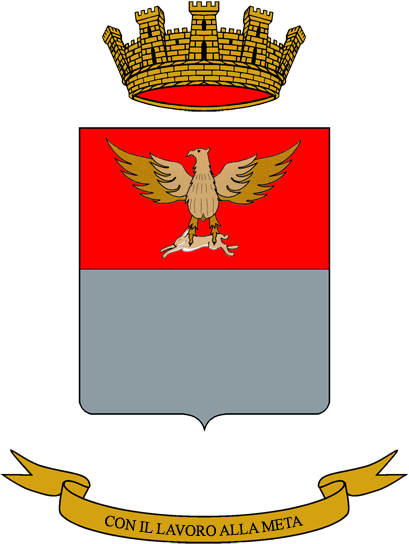
- Battalion coat of arms
- Active: 1 Oct. 1975 — 30 June 1996
- Country: Italy
- Branch: Italian Army
- Type: Military logistics
- Part of: Motorized Brigade "Acqui"
- Garrison/HQ: L'Aquila
- Motto(s): "Con il lavoro alla meta"
- Anniversaries: 22 May 1916 - Battle of Asiago
- Decorations: 1× Silver Cross of Army Merit

Insignia
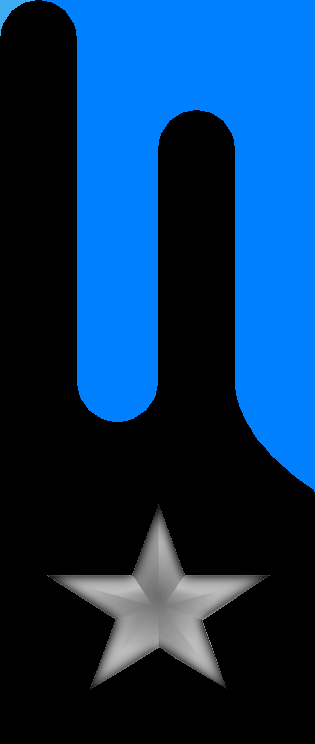
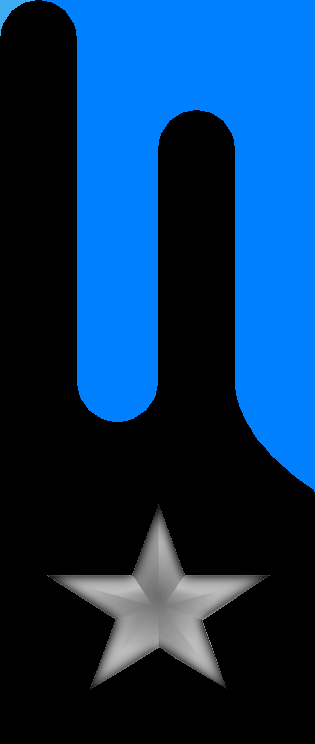
- Unit gorget patches

The Logistic Battalion "Acqui" (Italian: Battaglione Logistico "Acqui") is an inactive military logistics battalion of the Italian Army, which was assigned to the Motorized Brigade "Acqui". The battalion's anniversary falls, as for all units of the Italian Army's Transport and Materiel Corps, on 22 May, the anniversary of the Royal Italian Army's first major use of automobiles to transport reinforcements to the Asiago plateau to counter the Austro-Hungarian Asiago Offensive in May 1916.

== History ==
The battalion is the spiritual successor of the logistic units of the Royal Italian Army's 33rd Infantry Division "Acqui", which fought in the Italian invasion of France and Greco-Italian War of World War II. In the evening of 8 September 1943, the Armistice of Cassibile, which ended hostilities between the Kingdom of Italy and the Anglo-American Allies, was announced by General Dwight D. Eisenhower on Radio Algiers and by Marshal Pietro Badoglio on Italian radio. Germany reacted by invading Italy and the "Acqui" division was massacred by German forces on the island of Cephalonia, after the division refused to surrender to the Germans.

=== Cold War ===
On 1 October 1975, as part of the 1975 army reform, the units of the Infantry Division "Granatieri di Sardegna" based in L'Aquila were reorganized and formed the Motorized Brigade "Acqui". On the same date, the Logistic Battalion "Acqui" was formed by merging and reorganizing the Resupply, Repairs, Recovery Unit, the Auto Unit, and the Provisions Company of the Infantry Division "Granatieri di Sardegna". The new battalion consisted of a command, a command platoon, a supply and transport company, a medium workshop, a vehicle park, and a medical company. At the time the battalion fielded 651 men (37 officers, 82 non-commissioned officers, and 532 soldiers).

Initially the Motorized Brigade "Acqui" remained assigned to the Infantry Division "Granatieri di Sardegna", which was in the process of reorganizing its remaining units as Mechanized Brigade "Granatieri di Sardegna". Consequently, the Logistic Battalion "Acqui" remained assigned to the "Granatieri di Sardegna" division's Services Grouping Command "Granatieri di Sardegna". On 1 November 1976, the division contracted to Mechanized Brigade "Granatieri di Sardegna" and, on the same day, the Motorized Brigade "Acqui" became an autonomous unit formation and was assigned the Logistic Battalion "Acqui".

On 12 November 1976, the President of the Italian Republic Giovanni Leone granted with decree 846 the battalion a flag.

On 1 October 1981, the battalion was reorganized and consisted afterwards of the following units:

- Logistic Battalion "Acqui", in L'Aquila
  - Command and Services Company
  - Supply Company
  - Maintenance Company
  - Medium Transport Company
  - Medical Unit (Reserve)

=== Recent times ===
From 19 September 1991 to 11 June 1992, the battalion operated a logistic center and a medical point in Vlorë in Albania to distribute aid to the local population. For its conduct and work in Vlorë the battalion was awarded a Silver Cross of Army Merit, which was affixed to the battalion's flag.

On 15 May 1996, the battalion joined the Mechanized Brigade "Granatieri di Sardegna". On 30 June 1996, the companies of the Logistic Battalion "Granatieri di Sardegna" in Civitavecchia were disbanded and the battalion's flag left for L'Aquila. On the same day, the Logistic Battalion "Acqui" in L'Aquila was declared disbanded. The next day, the flag of the Logistic Battalion "Granatieri di Sardegna" arrived in L'Aquila, where the battalion was reformed with the personnel and materiel of the Logistic Battalion "Acqui". The following 3 July, the flag of the Logistic Battalion "Acqui" was transferred to the Shrine of the Flags in the Vittoriano in Rome for safekeeping.

== See also ==
- Military logistics
