= Monte Cengio =

Mountain in Italy

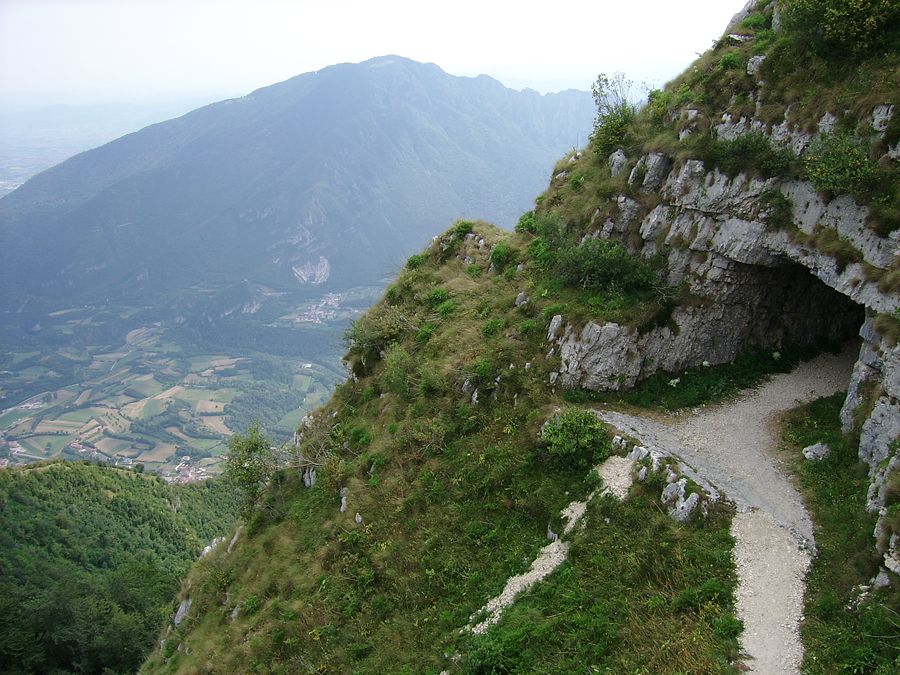
- A section of a World War I road on Monte Cengio

Highest point
- Elevation: 1,354 m (4,442 ft)
- Prominence: 305 m (1,001 ft)
- Coordinates: 45°48′39″N 11°23′44″E

Geography
- Location: Veneto, Italy
- Parent range: Vicentine Alps

Monte Cengio is a mountain in the Asiago plateau, within the Vicentine Alps, in Veneto, northeastern Italy. It has an elevation of 1,354 metres and is located on the southwestern edge of the plateau, in the territory of Cogollo del Cengio.

The mountain was heavily contested during the Battle of Asiago in the First World War; the Royal Italian Army's Brigade "Granatieri di Sardegna" distinguished itself in the fighting, suffering heavy losses. Over 10,000 soldiers were killed, wounded or missing on Monte Cengio between May and June 1916. A rocky spur overlooking a ravine, near the top of the mountain, became known as salto del granatiere ("grenadier's jump") after some grenadiers, who had been surrounded there and had run out of ammunition, grabbed some of the Austro-Hungarian attackers and jumped off the cliff along with them. In 1967 Monte Cengio was declared "sacred to the Fatherland" and proclaimed a monumental area. Wartime galleries and roads are part of the monumental area and are visited by hikers.
