= Mechanized Brigade "Granatieri di Sardegna" =

- Brigata Meccanizzata "Granatieri di Sardegna"
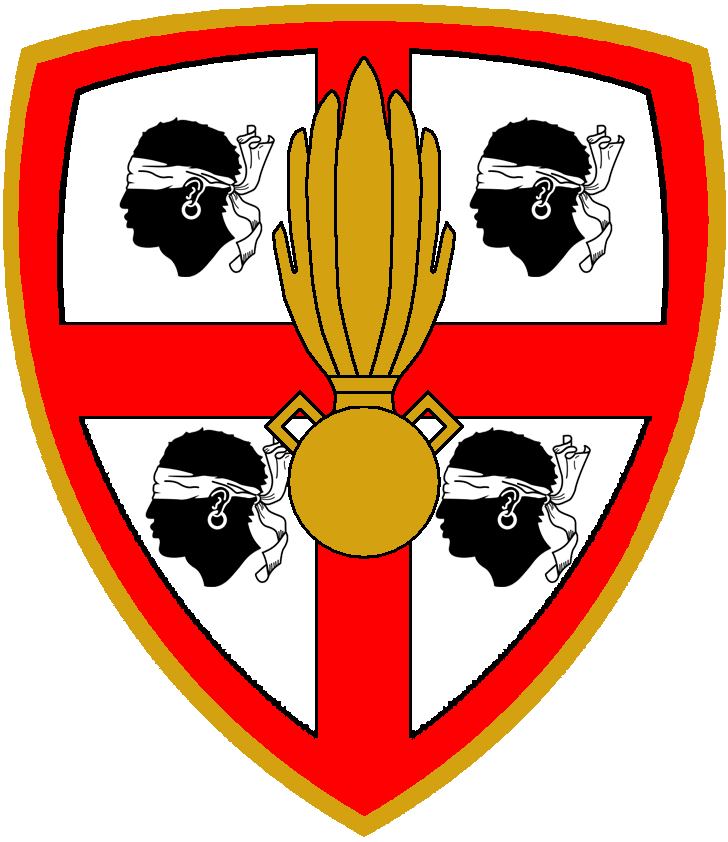
- Coat of Arms of the Mechanized Brigade "Granatieri di Sardegna"
- Active: 25 October 1831 – 20 April 1850; Guards Brigade; 20 April 1850 – November 1852; Granatieri Brigade; November 1852 – 25 October 1871; Brigade "Granatieri di Sardegna"; 2 January 1881 – 8 February 1934; Brigade "Granatieri di Sardegna"; 8 February 1934 – 10 September 1943; 21st Infantry Division "Granatieri di Sardegna"; 15 May 1944 – 31 August 1944; Granatieri Division; 1 April 1948 – 1 November 1976; Infantry Division "Granatieri di Sardegna"; 1 November 1976 – today Mechanized Brigade "Granatieri di Sardegna"
- Country: Italy
- Branch: Italian Army
- Role: Infantry
- Size: Brigade
- Part of: Division "Acqui"
- Garrison/HQ: Rome
- Colors: red
- Engagements: World War I World War II; Bosnia SFOR; Kosovo KFOR; Afghanistan ISAF; Iraq Multinational force in Iraq; UNIFIL

Commanders
- Current commander: Brigadier Giovanni Armentani

The Mechanized Brigade "Granatieri di Sardegna" (Italian: Brigata Meccanizzata "Granatieri di Sardegna" – Mechanized Brigade "Grenadiers of Sardinia") is a mechanized infantry brigade of the Italian Army, based in Rome and central Italy. The brigade fields one of the oldest regiments of the Army and is one of the guard regiments of the President of Italy. The name of the unit dates back to the Kingdom of Sardinia and not the eponymous Mediterranean island of Sardinia. The brigade is part of the Division "Acqui".

== History ==
=== 1831 & before ===
After Charles Albert of Sardinia ascended to the throne of the Kingdom of Sardinia on 27 April 1831 a major reform of the military was undertaken. Thus on 25 October 1831 the Grenadiers Brigade "Guardie" (Italian: Brigata Granatieri "Guardie") was raised as one of ten infantry brigades of the kingdom. The brigade consisted of the 1st Grenadiers Regiment (Italian: 1° Reggimento Granatieri), with four battalions of four companies each and a depot battalion of four companies, and the 2nd Hunters Regiment (Italian: 2° Reggimento Cacciatori), with three battalions of four companies each and a depot battalion of three companies.

The 1st Grenadiers Regiment was founded as Regiment of the Guards (Italian: Reggimento delle Guardie) on 18 April 1659 by the Duke of Savoy Charles Emmanuel II as his personal bodyguard regiment during military campaigns. The regiment participated in the War of the Spanish Succession, where it excelled during the Siege of Turin. After the Duchy had been elevated to kingdom in 1720 the regiment fought in the War of the Polish Succession and War of the Austrian Succession, during which the regiment performed exceptionally brave during the Battle of Assietta.

During the War of the First Coalition the regiment fought in the Italian campaigns against the French Army of Italy under Napoleon Bonaparte. After France annexed the Kingdom of Sardinia in 1799 the royal family went into exile on Sardinia and the Regiment of the Guards was disbanded.

The 2nd Hunters Regiment was founded on 13 July 1774 as Regiment of Sardinia (Italian: Reggimento di Sardegna) on the eponymous island and served as the guard regiment of the royal family during their exile there. After the defeat of Napoleon at the Battle of Leipzig in 1813 the royal family returned to Turin and the re-building of the Sardinian Army commenced in 1814. In 1814 the Regiment of the Guards was raised again as the Guards Regiment (Italian: Reggimento Guardie), while the Regiment of Sardinia moved to Turin, where it was renamed as Guard Hunters Regiment (Italian: Reggimento Cacciatori Guardie).

When the two regiments were combined in a brigade in 1831 they became the first units in the order of precedence of the kingdom.

=== 1831 to 1914 ===
The brigade participated in the First Italian War of Independence fighting in the battles of Santa Lucia, Goito, Pastrengo and Custoza. During the Battle of Goito the Sardinian King Charles Albert rallied the Grenadiers Brigade "Guardie" to his position with the words "A me le guardie!" ("To me the guards!"), which became the motto of the brigade's regiments. After the war the brigade was renamed Grenadiers Brigade (Italian: Brigata Granatieri) on 20 April 1850; the 2nd Hunters Regiment had already been renamed 2nd Grenadier Regiment in 1848.

In 1855 the brigade provided two battalions for the Sardinian Expeditionary Corps in the Crimean War. During the Second Italian War of Independence the brigade was involved in a skirmish near Lonato del Garda in June 1859. After the war the brigade participated in the occupation of the Umbria and the Marche regions in the Papal States, the conquest of which was completed when the Papal Army surrendered the fortress of Ancona on 29 September 1860. Afterwards the brigade, as part of the 1st Division of the Line of the V Army Corps, entered the Kingdom of the Two Sicilies to aid Giuseppe Garibaldi in his Expedition of the Thousand. The brigade fought at San Giuliano on 26 October 1860 and at Garigliano on 29 October 1860. Finally the brigade participated in the siege of Gaeta, where the 1st Grenadiers Regiment earned its first Gold Medal of Military Valor.

After Italy had been unified the brigade moved to Florence, the capital of the newly united Italy, where it took on guard duties at the royal palace. During the Third Italian War of Independence in 1866 the brigade fought at the Battle of Custoza. On 25 October 1871 the brigade level was abolished in the Royal Army and the two regiments became independent units with the names: 1st Regiment "Granatieri di Sardegna", and 2nd Regiment "Granatieri di Sardegna". When the army reintroduced the brigade level on 2 January 1881 the regiments changed their name to 1st Grenadier Regiment, and 2nd Grenadier Regiment as the title "Granatieri di Sardegna" returned to the brigade.

=== World War I ===
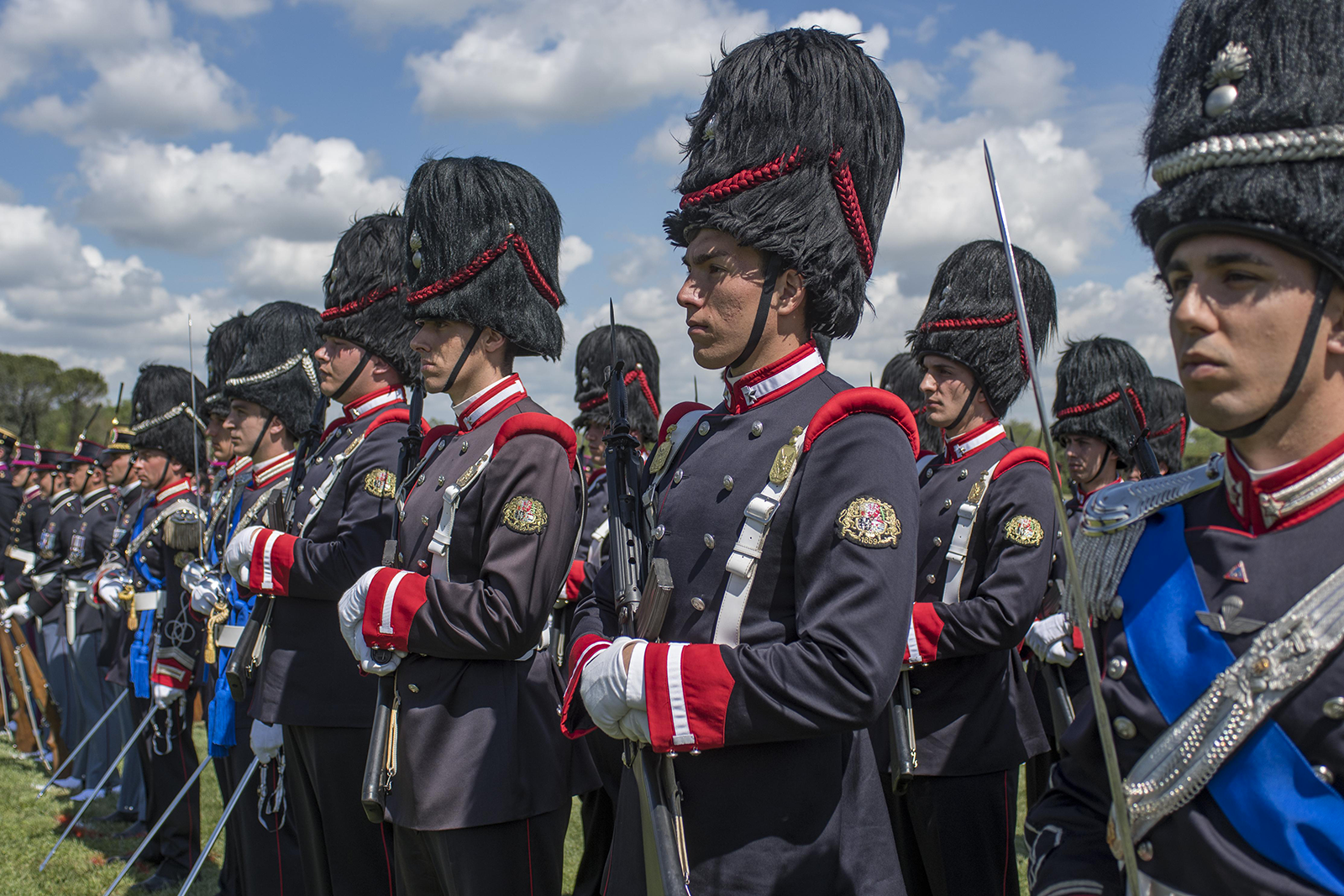
1st Regiment "Granatieri di Sardegna" troops with the bearskin cap introduced in 1834

At the outbreak of World War I the Brigade "Granatieri di Sardegna" moved to the Italian-Austrian border and after Italy's declaration of war on 23 May 1915 the brigade participated in the conquest of Monfalcone on the Adriatic coast. Afterwards the brigade participated in the first four Battles of the Isonzo aimed at conquering the city of Gorizia. The brigade tried to capture the Sabotin hill near Gorizia and later fought at Oslavia. After the brigade had again fought at Oslavia in the Fifth Battle of the Isonzo it was transferred to the Asiago plateau to reinforce the Italian First Army, which was retreating under the massive Austrian-Hungarian Asiago offensive.

There the brigade was sent to defended Monte Cengio – the last position between the Austrians and the Venetian plains. A loss of the mountain would have allowed the Austrians to advance towards Venice and encircle of Second Army, Third Army, and Fourth Army, which were holding the front along the Isonzo river and the Cadore and Carnia mountains. Arriving on Mount Cengio on 23 May 1916 the Granatieri held the position even after ammunition had been expended and the Austrians breached the brigade's line. Ultimately the stubborn defense of Mount Cengio ensured that the Austrians could not achieve the aims of their offensive. On 6 June 1916 the brigade was relieved on Mount Cengio, where it had suffered 4,478 casualties out of 6,000 men deployed. For their conduct both grenadier regiments were awarded a Gold Medal of Military Valor.

After the Austrian offensive had been defeated the brigade returned to the Isonzo front and participated in the sixth, seventh, and eighth Battle of the Isonzo. During 1917 the brigade continued to fight along the Isonzo river. After the Italian defeat in the Battle of Caporetto and the following retreat to the Piave river the brigade had to be rebuilt. In 1918 the brigade fought in the last two battles on the Italian front: the Battle of the Piave River and the final and decisive Battle of Vittorio Veneto.

After the war the brigade was garrisoned in Rome, where a third Grenadier Regiment was raised on 1 December 1926. On the same day the brigade with its three regiments came under the 21st Infantry Division. On that day the Grenadiers Brigade was renamed XXI Infantry Brigade, while its three grenadier regiments became the 1st Regiment "Granatieri di Sardegna", 2nd Regiment "Granatieri di Sardegna", and 3rd Regiment "Granatieri di Sardegna".

=== World War II ===
On 8 February 1934 the 21st Infantry Division was named "Granatieri di Sardegna". In 1939 the 21st Infantry Division "Granatieri di Sardegna" lost the 3rd Regiment "Granatieri di Sardegna" and thus the division entered World War II with its two Granatieri regiments, the 13th Field Artillery Regiment "Granatieri di Sardegna", and some minor units.

In June 1940 the division was mobilized and took part in the Italian invasion of France as a part of the VII Army, but due to the quick German victory in the Battle of France the division was not involved in any combat operations before the French surrender.

In spring 1943 the division was moved to Rome to aid in the defence of the city in case of an Allied attack. During this time the division was reorganized along the lines of the Mod.43 reform of the Italian Army and was augmented with the XXI Mortar Battalion. In total the division fielded 14,500 troops. After the armistice between Italy and Allies of 8 September 1943 the division found itself fighting Italy's former allies the Germans and along with the 12th Infantry Division "Sassari" and 135th Armored Division "Ariete II" the Granatieri defended Rome. The Granatieri fought along the Via Ostiensis for two days before falling back to the Porta San Paolo where the division fought a last stand. There the division was joined by remnants of the "Sassari" division, the cavalry Regiment "Lancieri di Montebello" (8th) and hundreds of civilian volunteers. The future Italian president Sandro Pertini brought a detachment of resistance fighters to Porta San Paolo where they received the weapons of fallen grenadiers. Civilians at Porta San Paolo included communist leader Luigi Longo, lawyer Giuliano Vassalli, writer Emilio Lussu, unionist leaders Vincenzo Baldazzi, Mario Zagari, retired Air Force generals Sabato Martelli Castaldi and Roberto Lordi, and 18-year-old future partisan leader Marisa Musu. Around 12:30 reinforcements including famed actor Carlo Ninchi. However, by 17:00 the Germans broke the line of the Italian defenders, who had suffered 570 dead. Soon after the Italian military units surrendered to the Germans as the flight of the Italian King Victor Emmanuel III from Rome had made further resistance senseless. However the Italian soldiers handed thousands of weapons over to the civilian population, which was quick to form an organized resistance movement in the city of Rome.

For their role in the defence of the Rome the 1st Regiment "Granatieri di Sardegna" and the Regiment "Lancieri di Montebello" (8th) were each awarded a Silver Medal of Military Valor, while the 2nd Regiment "Granatieri di Sardegna" and the 13th Field Artillery Regiment "Granatieri di Sardegna" were awarded a Bronze Medal of Military Valor each.

At the same time the "Granatieri di Sardegna" division fought the Germans in Rome three Granatieri battalions based in occupied Corsica refused to surrender to the Germans and along with the 20th Infantry Division "Friuli", 44th Infantry Division "Cremona", 225th Coastal Division, 226th Coastal Division and French partisans began to fight the Axis troops: the German Sturmbrigade Reichsführer SS and 90th Panzergrenadier Division, and the Italian XII Battalion, 184th Infantry Regiment "Nembo" of the 184th Infantry Division "Nembo", which had come from Sardinia and tried to retreat through Corsica towards the harbour of Bastia in the island's north. On 13 September elements of the Free French 4th Moroccan Mountain Division landed in Ajaccio to support the Italian efforts to stop the 30,000 retreating Germans. However the Germans managed to escape.

The three loyal Granatieri battalions were combined by the Italian Co-Belligerent Army with other units to raise "Granatieri di Sardegna" division anew in Sardinia on 15 May 1944. The division consisted of the 1st Regiment "Granatieri di Sardegna", 2nd Regiment "Granatieri di Sardegna", 32nd Tank Infantry Regiment, 132nd Tank Infantry Regiment, 548th Artillery Regiment, 553rd Artillery Regiment, and an Engineer Company. However it was decided that the infantry of the division should join the Combat Group "Friuli", which fought already on the allies side on the Italian front. On 31 August 1944 the Granatieri division was disbanded with the remaining units used to augment the Combat Group "Cremona".

=== Cold War ===
==== Infantry Division "Granatieri di Sardegna" ====
After World War II the Italian Army began to rebuild its units with American help: on 1 July 1946 the 1st Regiment "Granatieri di Sardegna" was raised in Rome, followed by the 13th Field Artillery Regiment "Granatieri di Sardegna" on 1 March 1948. Both regiments entered the Infantry Division "Granatieri di Sardegna", when the division was raised anew in Rome on 1 April 1948. The two regiments were joined by the 17th Infantry Regiment "Acqui" and the 46th Infantry Regiment "Reggio" and in the following years the division was augmented with further units, among them the 3rd Armored Infantry Regiment. In 1959, the 46th Infantry Regiment "Reggio" was disbanded. By 1974 the division consisted of the:

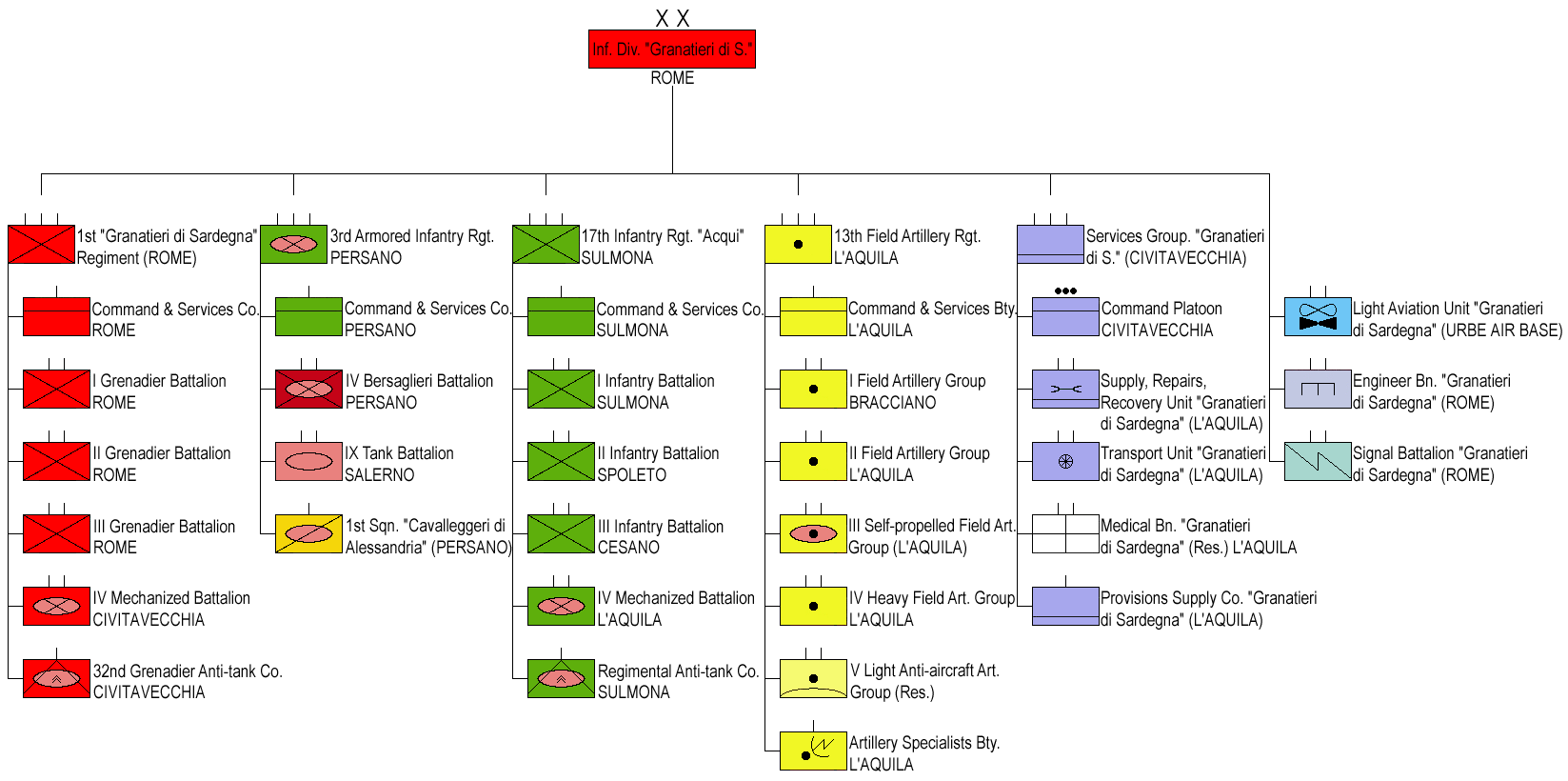
Infantry Division "Granatieri di Sardegna" in 1974

- Infantry Division "Granatieri di Sardegna", in Rome
  - 1st Regiment "Granatieri di Sardegna", in Rome
    - Command and Services Company, in Rome
    - I Granatieri Battalion, in Rome
    - II Granatieri Battalion, in Rome
    - III Granatieri Battalion, in Rome
    - IV Mechanized Battalion, in Civitavecchia (M113 armored personnel carriers and M47 tanks)
    - 32nd Granatieri Anti-tank Company, in Civitavecchia (anti-tank guided missiles and M47 tanks)
  - 3rd Armored Infantry Regiment, in Persano (detached to the Scuola Truppe Meccanizzate e Corazzate)
    - Command and Services Company, in Persano (includes an anti-tank guided missile platoon)
    - IV Bersaglieri Battalion, in Persano (M113 armored personnel carriers)
    - IX Tank Battalion, in Salerno (M47 Patton tanks)
    - Squadron "Cavalleggeri di Alessandria", in Persano
  - 17th Infantry Regiment "Acqui", in Sulmona
    - Command and Services Company, in Sulmona
    - I Infantry Battalion, in Sulmona
    - II Infantry Battalion, in Spoleto
    - III Infantry Battalion, in Cesano
    - IV Mechanized Battalion, in L'Aquila (M113 armored personnel carriers and M47 tanks)
    - Regimental Anti-tank Company, in Sulmona (anti-tank guided missiles and M47 tanks)
  - 13th Field Artillery Regiment, in L’Aquila
    - Command and Services Battery, in L’Aquila
    - I Field Artillery Group, in Bracciano (M14/61 105 mm towed howitzers)
    - II Field Artillery Group, in L'Aquila (M14/61 105mm towed howitzers)
    - III Self-propelled Field Artillery Group, in L'Aquila (M7 105 mm self-propelled howitzers; 7th Battery assigned to 3rd Armored Infantry Regiment in Persano)
    - IV Heavy Field Artillery Group, in L’Aquila (M114 155 mm towed howitzers)
    - V Light Anti-aircraft Artillery Group (Reserve), in (?) (Bofors 40 mm anti-aircraft guns and 12.7mm anti-aircraft machine guns)
    - Artillery Specialists Battery, in L’Aquila
  - Light Aviation Unit "Granatieri di Sardegna", at Rome-Urbe Air Base (L-19E Bird Dog light aircraft and AB 206 reconnaissance helicopters)
  - Engineer Battalion "Granatieri di Sardegna", in Rome
  - Signal Battalion "Granatieri di Sardegna", in Rome
  - Services Grouping "Granatieri di Sardegna", in Civitavecchia
    - Command Platoon, in Civitavecchia
    - Resupply, Repairs, Recovery Unit "Granatieri di Sardegna", in L'Aquila
    - Transport Unit "Granatieri di Sardegna", in L'Aquila
    - Medical Battalion "Granatieri di Sardegna" (Reserve), in L'Aquila
    - Provisions Company "Granatieri di Sardegna", in L'Aquila

==== Mechanized Brigade "Granatieri di Sardegna" ====
During the 1975 army reform the regimental level was abolished and battalions came forthwith under direct command of multi-arms brigades. Therefore, the army decided to split the Infantry Division "Granatieri di Sardegna" in two brigades. On 30 September 1975 the 17th Infantry Regiment "Acqui" was disbanded and on 1 October 1975 the Motorized Brigade "Acqui" raised from the regimental command. The "Granatieri di Sardegna" division remained active for one more year to change from a motorized to a mechanized unit by adding the battalions of the 1st Armored Bersaglieri Regiment and the II Self-propelled Field Artillery Group of the Armored Division "Centauro", before contracting to Mechanized Brigade "Granatieri di Sardegna" on 1 November 1976. The brigade commanded the following units after the reform was complete:

- Mechanized Brigade "Granatieri di Sardegna", in Rome
  - Command and Signal Unit "Granatieri di Sardegna", in Rome
  - 1st Mechanized Granatieri Battalion "Assietta", in Rome (former I Battalion, 1st Regiment "Granatieri di Sardegna" Regiment)
  - 2nd Mechanized Granatieri Battalion "Cengio", in Rome (former II Battalion, 1st Regiment "Granatieri di Sardegna")
  - 3rd Granatieri (Recruits Training) Battalion "Guardie", in Orvieto (former III Battalion, 80th Infantry (Recruits Training) Regiment "Roma")
  - 1st Bersaglieri Battalion "La Marmora", in Civitavecchia (former I Bersaglieri Battalion, 1st Armored Bersaglieri Regiment)
  - 6th Tank Battalion "M.O. Scapuzzi", in Civitavecchia (M47 Patton tanks) (former VI Tank Battalion, 1st Armored Bersaglieri Regiment)
  - 13th Field Artillery Group "Magliana", in Civitavecchia (M114 155 mm towed howitzers) (former II Self-propelled Field Artillery Group, 131st Armored Artillery Regiment)
  - Logistic Battalion "Granatieri di Sardegna", in Civitavecchia (former Services Grouping "Granatieri di Sardegna")
  - 14th Reconnaissance Squadron "Cavalleggeri di Alessandria", in Civitavecchia (put in reserve status 30 June 1979)
  - 32nd Granatieri Anti-tank Company, in Civitavecchia (BGM-71 TOW anti-tank guided missiles) (former Bersaglieri Anti-tank Company, 1st Armored Bersaglieri Regiment)
  - Engineer Company "Granatieri di Sardegna", in Civitavecchia (split from the Pioneer Battalion "Granatieri di Sardegna")

=== After the Cold War ===
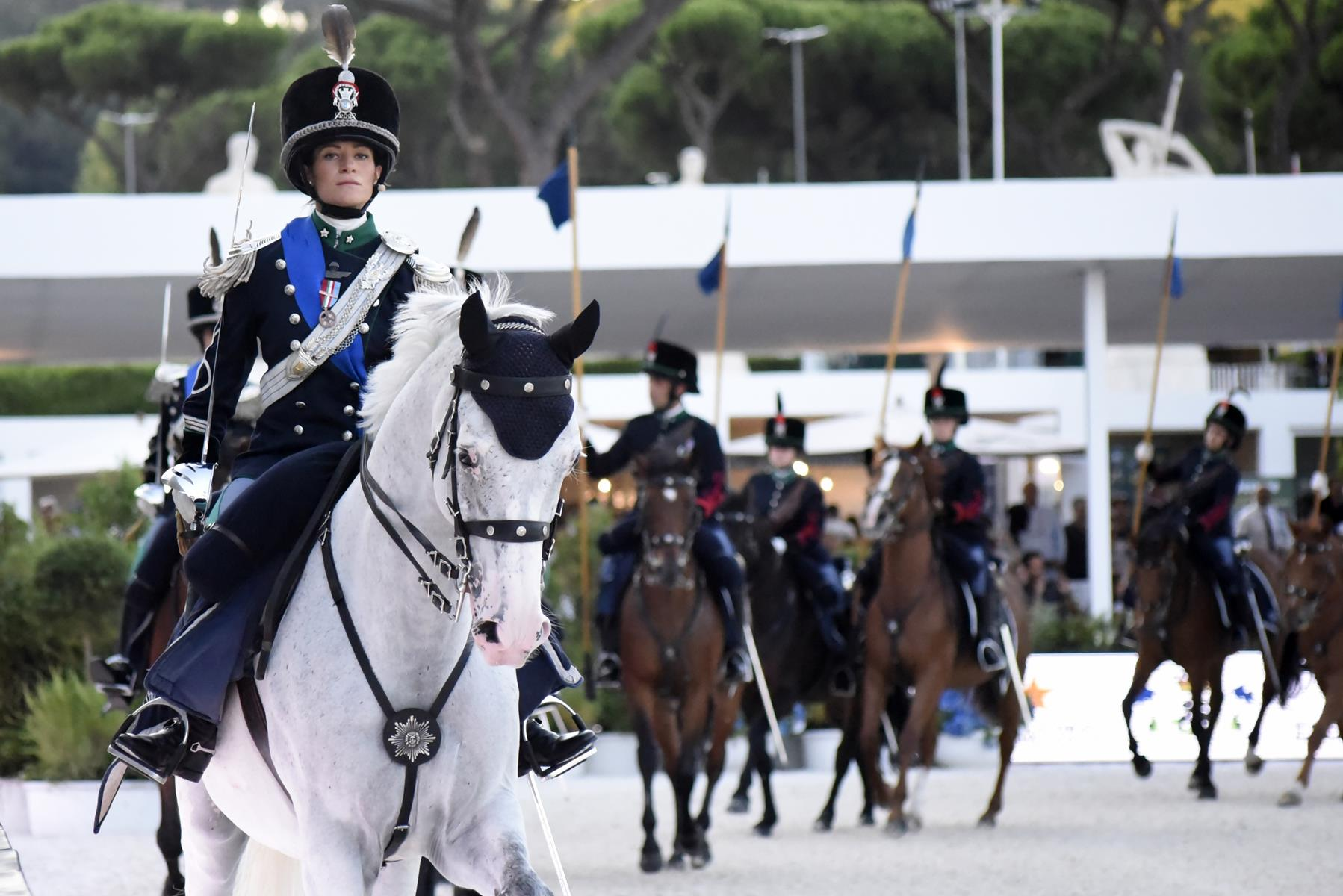
Regiment "Lancieri di Montebello" (8th) on public duties

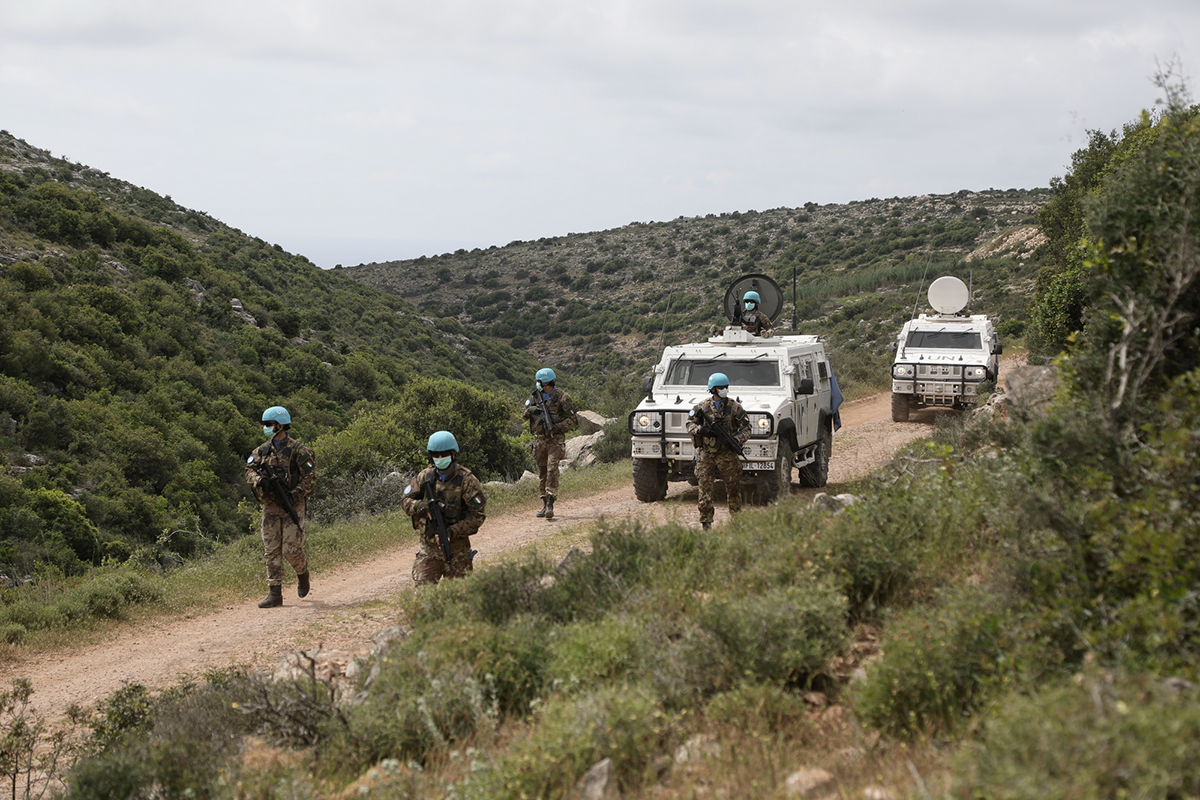
A Granatieri squad patrolling the Blue Line in southern Lebanon

With the end of the Cold War the Italian Army began to draw down its forces and battalions returned to their regimental names for traditional reasons. On 30 November 1992 the Anti-tank Company was disbanded, and on 4 October 1993 the Engineer Company merged with the Command and Signal Unit, which was renamed as Command and Tactical Supports Unit. On 1 September of the same year the 6th Tank Battalion was renamed 4th Tank Regiment, but on 9 October 1995 the regiment was transferred to Bellinzago Novarese, where it joined the Armored Brigade "Centauro". In spring 1992 the 13th Field Artillery Group "Magliana" received M109G 155 mm self-propelled howitzers and was elevated to regiment on 19 August of the same year with the name: 13th Self-propelled Field Artillery Regiment "Granatieri di Sardegna". Three years later on 20 September 1995 the regiment was disbanded and the 7th Self-propelled Field Artillery Regiment "Cremona" of the Motorized Brigade "Cremona" moved from Turin to Rome to join the "Granatieri di Sardegna" brigade on 21 December 1995. On 15 May 1996 the 33rd Self-propelled Field Artillery Group "Acqui" joined the brigade when the army disbanded the Motorized Brigade "Acqui", and the 7th Self-propelled Field Artillery Regiment "Cremona" transferred to army's Artillery Command to become an NBC-defence unit. At the same time the Regiment "Lancieri di Montebello" (8th) entered the brigade, while the 3rd Regiment "Granatieri Guardie" left the brigade. After the last round of reforms in 1997 the brigade consisted of the following units:

- Mechanized Brigade "Granatieri di Sardegna", in Rome
  - Command and Tactical Supports Unit "Granatieri di Sardegna", in Rome
  - 1st Regiment "Granatieri di Sardegna", in Rome
  - 2nd Regiment "Granatieri di Sardegna", in Spoleto
  - 1st Bersaglieri Regiment, in Rome
  - Regiment "Lancieri di Montebello" (8th), in Rome
  - 33rd Self-propelled Field Artillery Group "Acqui", in L'Aquila
  - Logistic Battalion "Granatieri di Sardegna", in Civitavecchia

== Organization ==
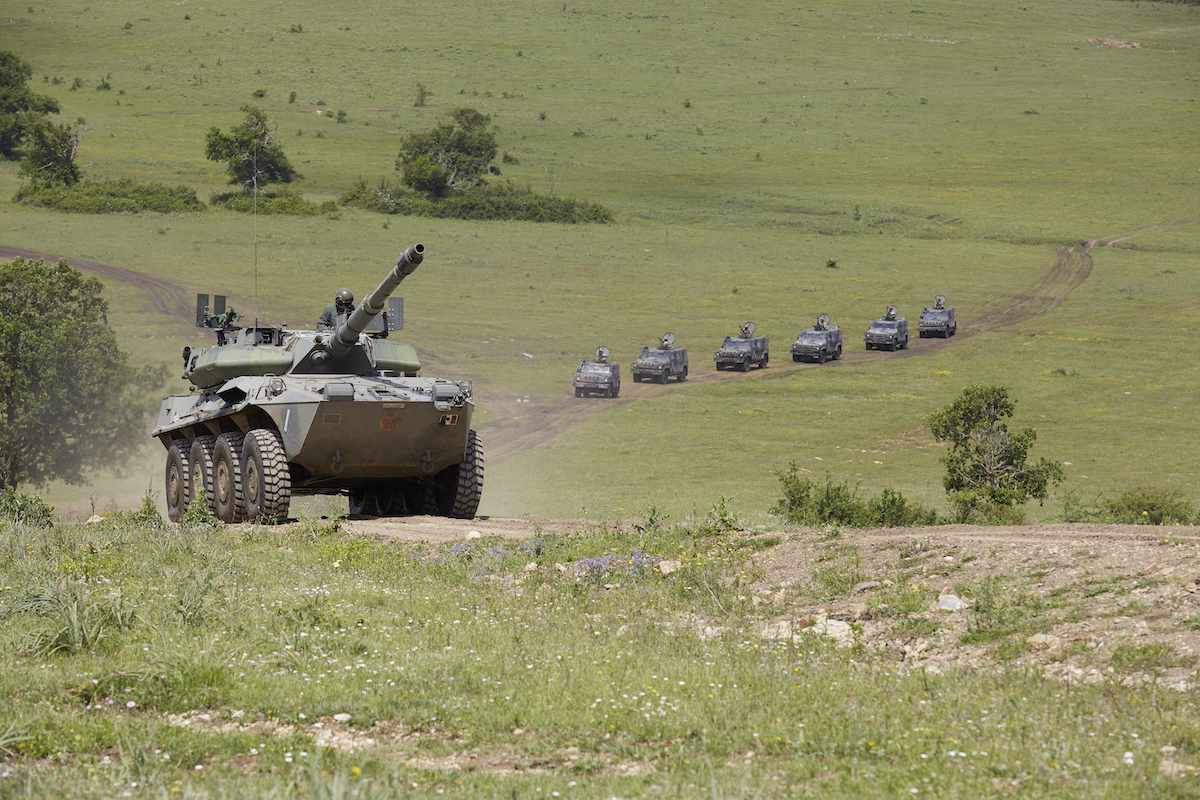
Regiment "Lancieri di Montebello" (8th) during an exercise at Monte Romano, May 2019

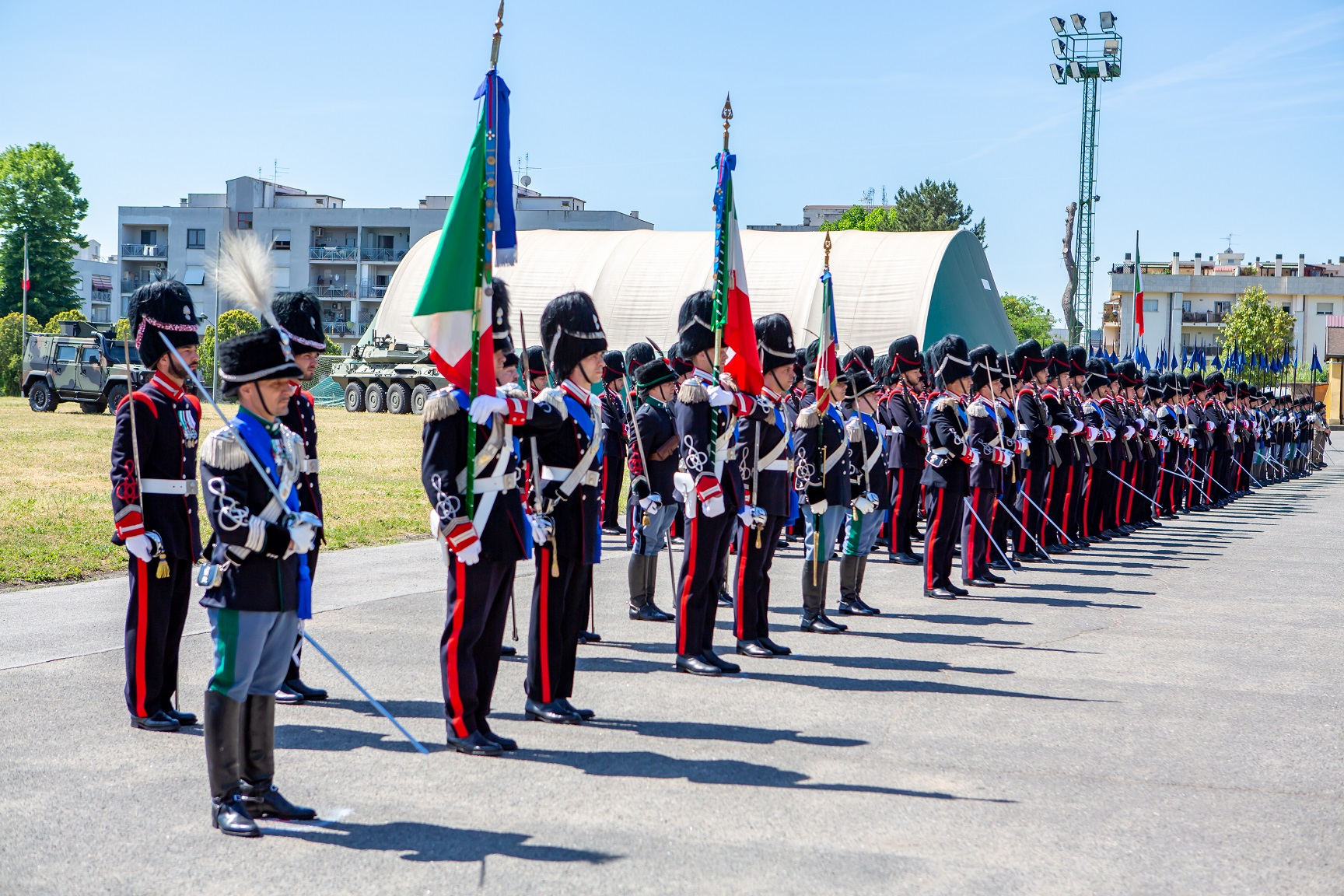
The flags of the brigade's regiments on parade

In the following years the brigade was further reduced: on 29 October 2002 the 2nd Regiment "Granatieri di Sardegna" in Spoleto was disbanded and its remaining two mechanized companies came under the 1st Regiment "Granatieri di Sardegna" as 2nd Battalion "Cengio". On 1 January 2005 the 1st Bersaglieri Regiment was disbanded and the name transferred to the 18th Bersaglieri Regiment of the Bersaglieri Brigade "Garibaldi". Since 2000 the brigade deployed its units three times as part of KFOR to Kosovo and once as part of UNIFIL to Lebanon. With the abolition of mandatory military service in Italy in 2004 the required height to join the Grenadiers was lowered from 195 cm to 190 cm.

In 2013 it was announced that the brigade would be disbanded by 2016. In 2013 the 33rd Artillery Regiment "Acqui" was used to create the 185th Paratroopers Artillery Regiment "Folgore" for the Paratroopers Brigade "Folgore", while the Regiment "Lancieri di Montebello" (8th) was set to join the Mechanized Brigade "Pinerolo". The 1st Regiment "Granatieri di Sardegna" would have become a guard regiment under the Infantry School in Rome, tasked with public duties in the Italian capital. In 2017 these plans were reversed and on 21 November the 2nd Battalion "Cengio" became an autonomous battalion and the process of raising additional companies to bring it back to full strength began. The 2nd Regiment "Granatieri di Sardegna" was reactivated on 1 September 2022.

As of 4 October 2022 the brigade is organized as follows:

- Mechanized Brigade "Granatieri di Sardegna", in Rome (Lazio)
  - 3rd Granatieri Command and Tactical Supports Unit "Guardie", in Rome (Lazio)
  - Regiment "Lancieri di Montebello" (8th), in Rome (Lazio)
    - Armored Squadron Group (Centauro tank destroyers)
    - Horse Squadron Group tasked with public duties in Rome
  - 1st Regiment "Granatieri di Sardegna", in Rome (Lazio) (Dardo infantry fighting vehicles)
  - 2nd Regiment "Granatieri di Sardegna", in Spoleto (Umbria) (VTLM Lince vehicles, will receive infantry fighting vehicles in the future)

== Equipment ==
The "Lancieri di Montebello" cavalry regiment is equipped with Centauro wheeled tank destroyers and VTLM Lince vehicles. The 1st Regiment "Granatieri di Sardegna" is equipped with Dardo tracked infantry fighting vehicles, while the 2nd Regiment "Granatieri di Sardegna" is equipped with VTLM Lince vehicles until more infantry fighting vehicles become available.

== Gorget patches ==
The personnel of the brigade's units wears the following gorget patches:

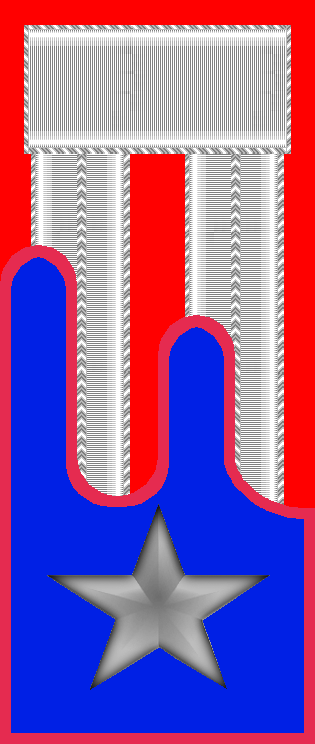
3rd Granatieri Command and Tactical Supports Unit "Guardie"

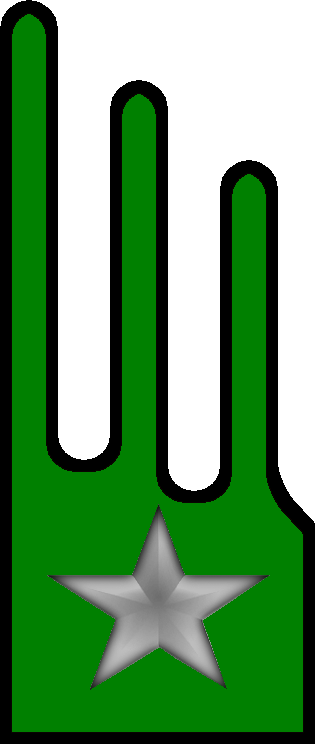
Regiment "Lancieri di Montebello" (8th)

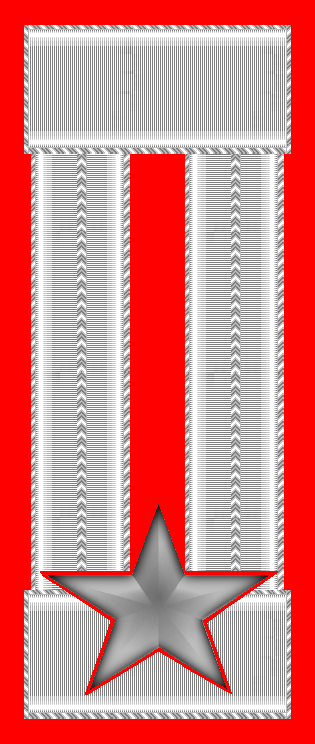
1st Regiment "Granatieri di Sardegna"

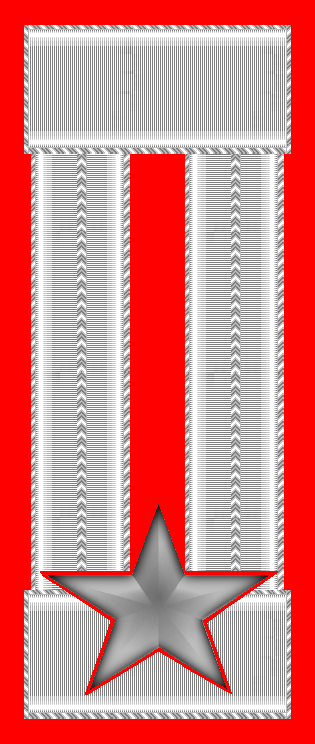
2nd Regiment "Granatieri di Sardegna"

== Traditions ==
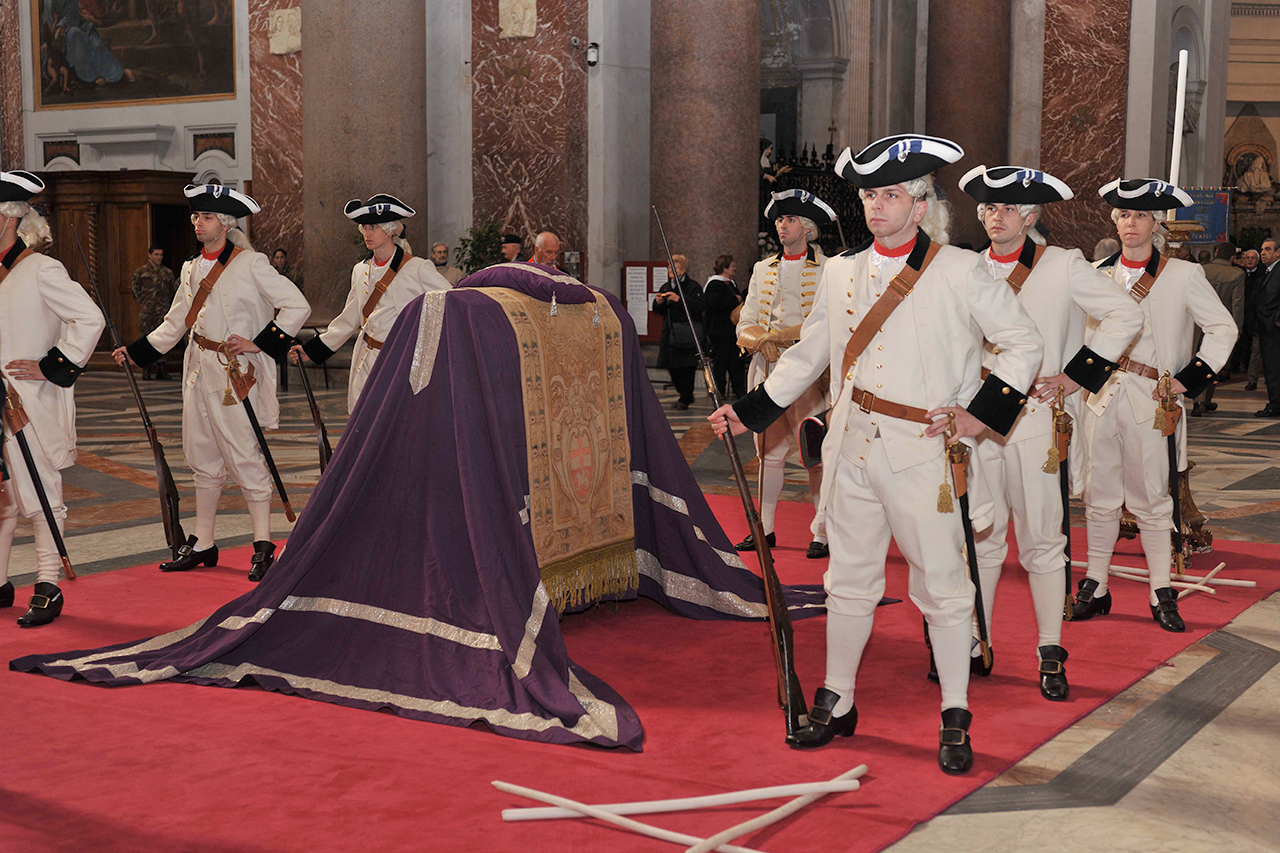
Grenadiers in historical uniform during the mass in memory of Don Alberto Genovese on 18 February 2016

Every 18 February the brigade celebrates a mass in memory of Don Alberto Genovese, Duke of San Pietro, whose father Don Bernardino Antonio Genovese had founded the Regiment of Sardinia in 1744 and was the regiment's colonel until 1759. In 1776 Don Alberto Genovese donated 120,000 Piedmontese scudo to the Regiment of Sardinia for the establishment and subsequent maintenance of the regimental band, as well as to help the widows of fallen soldiers. He also requested that the regiment celebrate in perpetuity a holy mass in his memory on the anniversary of his death, a request the regiment has fulfilled since 1776.
