= Motorized Brigade "Acqui" =

Brigata Motorizzata "Acqui"
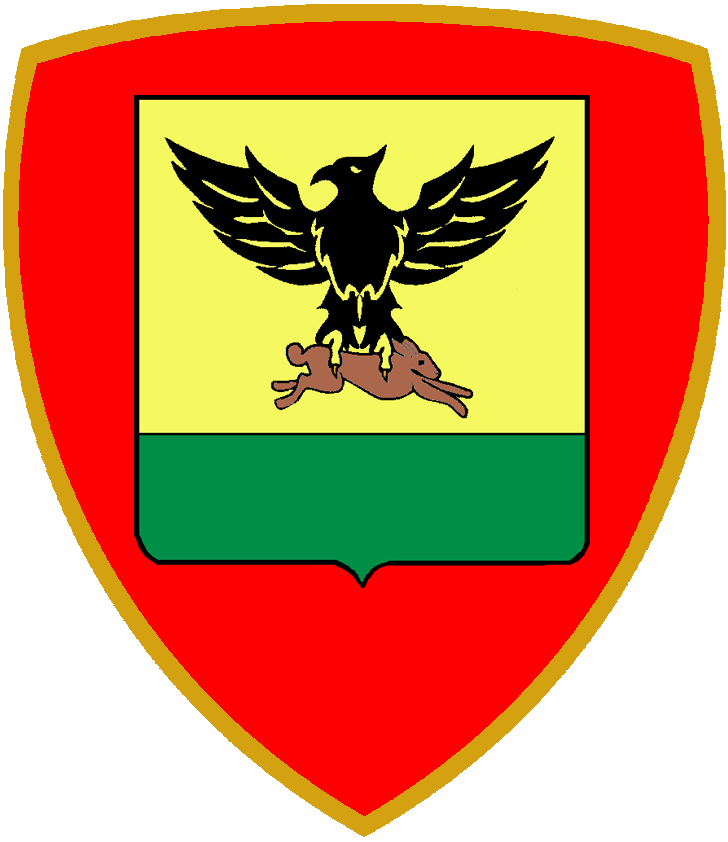
- Coat of Arms of the Motorized Brigade "Acqui"
- Active: 25 October 1831 - 30 June 1996; 1 January 2003 - today
- Country: Italy
- Allegiance: Italian Army
- Branch: Army
- Type: Brigade
- Role: Infantry
- Part of: COMFOTER
- Garrison/HQ: L'Aquila

The Motorized Brigade "Acqui" was an infantry brigade of the Italian Army, based in the centre of the Italian Peninsula. The brigade's name was one of the oldest of the Italian Army and connected the brigade to its original area of recruitment around the city of Acqui. The brigade was disbanded in 1996, but re-raised as a deployable division command in 2003 and elevated to full division with assigned brigades in 2013.

Carrying the name of the Piedmontese city of Acqui the brigade's coat of arms was modeled after the city's coat of arms.

== History ==
=== 1831 to 1914 ===
After the ascension to the throne of Charles Albert of Sardinia on 27 April 1831 a major reform of the military of the Kingdom of Piedmont was undertaken. Thus on 25 October 1831 the "Acqui" Brigade was raised in Nice and consisted of the 1st Infantry Regiment and the 2nd Infantry Regiment. The 1st Infantry Regiment continued the traditions of the "Desportes" Regiment founded on 27 October 1703 by Victor Amadeus II of Sardinia as a foreign volunteer regiment. By 1839 each regiment fielded four battalions, which in turn fielded 4 companies of 250 men each. In 1839 the regiments of the "Acqui" were numbered and renamed as 17th Infantry Regiment "Acqui" and 18th Infantry Regiment "Acqui".

The brigade participated in the First Italian War of Independence fighting in the battles of Santa Lucia, Goito and Novara. For its conduct at Novara the 17th Infantry Regiment was awarded a Silver Medal of Military Valor. In 1855 the brigade provided two battalions for the Sardinian Expeditionary Corps in the Crimean War. In the Second Italian War of Independence the brigade was employed in the battles of Magenta and Solferino. For its service at Solferino the 17th Infantry Regiment was awarded its second Silver Medal of Military Valor. In the following years the brigade was employed in Calabria and the region of Salerno to suppress the popular revolt of the peasant population against the annexation of the Kingdom of the Two Sicilies into the new Kingdom of Italy.

The brigade was based in Reggio Emilia, when it was in disbanded in 1871 during a reorganization of the Army; but by 2 January 1881 the Army returned to a brigade structure and the Acqui was raised anew with the same two regiments.

=== World War I ===
At the outbreak of World War I the brigade was based around the city of Ascoli Piceno with its two regiments fielding three battalions each and each of the battalions consisting of four companies and a machine gun section. The brigade fought in the Battles of the Isonzo and in the Battle of Vittorio Veneto.

On 15 October 1926 the brigade was disbanded with its regiments joining other brigades.

=== World War II ===
In 1939 the name "Acqui" was given to the newly formed 33rd Mountain Infantry Division. After the entry of Italy into the war on 20 June 1940 the division entered France in the area of Argentera.

After the Italian invasion of Greece in October 1940 bogged down under stiff Greek resistance the "Acqui" Division was dispatched in December 1940 to Albania to augment the Italian forces under pressure by the Greek counteroffensive. The division saw heavy combat near Himarë and Vuno when the Greek army managed to break through the Italian lines after the Battle of Himara. The division participated in the Italian Spring Offensive in 1941 and in marched into Greece following the German invasion of Greece.

In May 1943 the division transferred for garrison duties to the Greek island of Cefalonia. After Italy's surrender to the Allies on 3 September 1943 the divisions commanding general Antonio Gandin was left without clear orders from his superiors. Therefore, Gandin decided to let his soldiers vote on 13 September 1943 as to what to do to next. The troops voted overwhelmingly to fight their former allies the Germans, thus the Acqui became one of the very few Italian units to actively resist the Germans. After defeating the Acqui's resistance the Germans summarily executed over half of the divisions soldiers and all of its officers during the Massacre of the Acqui Division.

=== Cold War ===
==== 17th Infantry Regiment "Acqui" ====
After World War II the 17th Infantry Regiment "Acqui" was raised again on 1 January 1948 in Sulmona as one of the three regiments of the Infantry Division "Granatieri di Sardegna". The regiment was awarded a Silver Medal of Military Valor for its service in the Greco-Italian War and a Gold Medal of Military Valor for its conduct on Cephalonia.

The regiment gained and lost units during the following years and in 1974, before the 1975 army reform the regiment consisted of the following units:

- 17th Infantry Regiment "Acqui", in Sulmona
  - Command and Services Company, in Sulmona** I Infantry Battalion, in Sulmona
  - II Infantry Battalion, in Spoleto
  - III Infantry Battalion, in Cesano
  - IV Mechanized Battalion, in L'Aquila (M113 armored personnel carriers and M47 Patton tanks)
  - Regimental Anti-tank Company, in Sulmona (anti-tank guided missiles and M47 tanks)

==== Motorized Brigade "Acqui" ====
With the 1975 Army reform the regimental level was abolished and battalions came under direct command of newly formed multi-arms brigades. Therefore, the army decided to split the "Granatieri di Sardegna" Division into two brigades. On 30 September 1975 the 17th Infantry Regiment "Acqui" was disbanded and on 1 October 1975 the Motorized Brigade "Acqui" raised in its stead in the city of L'Aquila. The brigade commanded the following units after the reform was complete:

- Motorized Brigade "Acqui", in L'Aquila
  - Command and Signal Unit "Acqui", in L'Aquila
  - 17th Infantry Battalion "San Martino" (Recruits Training), in Sulmona (former I Battalion, 17th Infantry Regiment "Acqui")
  - 57th Motorized Infantry Battalion "Abruzzi", in Sora (former I Battalion, 80th Infantry (Recruits Training) Regiment "Roma")
  - 130th Motorized Infantry Battalion "Perugia", in Spoleto (former II Battalion, 17th Infantry Regiment "Acqui")
  - 9th Armored Battalion "M.O. Butera", in L'Aquila (M47 Patton tanks and M113 APCs, former IV Mechanized Battalion, 17th Infantry Regiment "Acqui"; assigned the flag of the 3rd Armored Infantry Regiment)
  - 48th Field Artillery Group "Taro", in L’Aquila (M114 155mm towed howitzers) (former IV Field Artillery Group, 13th Artillery Regiment)
  - Logistic Battalion "Acqui", in L'Aquila
  - Anti-tank Company "Acqui", in L'Aquila (BGM-71 TOW anti-tank guided missiles)
  - Engineer Company "Acqui", in Sora

The brigade also stored the equipment for a third maneuver battalion in Sulmona, which in case of war would have been filled with reservists, and recruits from the 17th Infantry Battalion "San Martino", and would have been named 70th Motorized Infantry Battalion "Ancona".

==== Mechanized Brigade "Acqui" ====
In 1991 after the end of the Cold War the Italian Army disbanded a large number of its mechanized units in Northern Italy and transferred their equipment to the Acqui: consequently the brigade's infantry battalions received VCC-2 armoured personnel carriers, while the 48th "Taro" was equipped with M109L self-propelled howitzers. Accordingly, the brigade changed its name on 1 October 1991 to Mechanized Brigade "Acqui". During the same year the brigade lost the 57th "Abruzzi" and 9th "M.O. Butera" battalions, but gained the 123rd Infantry Battalion "Chieti" (Recruits Training) in Chieti. During the same year the battalions were renamed as regiments for traditional reasons.

Before the brigade was disbanded on 30 June 1996 its units were either disbanded or joined other brigades: in 1995 the 17th Infantry Regiment "Acqui" (Recruits Training) and the 123rd Infantry Regiment "Chieti" (Recruits Training) joined the Army Training Command, while the 130th Mechanized Infantry Battalion "Perugia", Logistic Battalion "Acqui", and the 48th Self-propelled Field Artillery Regiment "Taro", which had been renamed 33rd Self-propelled Field Artillery Regiment "Acqui" on 11 September 1995, joined the Mechanized Brigade "Granatieri di Sardegna" on 15 May 1996.

== Division "Acqui" ==
In 2002 the Italian Army raised three division commands, with one of the three always readily deployable for NATO missions. The army decided that each division should carry on the traditions of one of the divisions that served with distinction in World War II. Therefore, on 31 December 2002 the 3rd Italian Division in San Giorgio a Cremano was renamed as Division Command "Acqui".
