= Arbib =

Arbib is a surname. Notable people with the surname include:

- Mark Arbib (born 1971), Australian politician
- Sir Martyn Arbib (born 1939), British businessman
- Michael A. Arbib (born 1940), British computer scientist
- Richard Arbib (1917–1995), American industrial designer
- Robert S. Arbib Jr. (1915–1987), American ornithologist and writer

== See also ==
- Luigi Arbib Pascucci, Italian tank commander during World War Two
