= 1st Regiment "Granatieri di Sardegna" =

Active Italian Army Grenadiers unit

- 1° Reggimento "Granatieri di Sardegna"
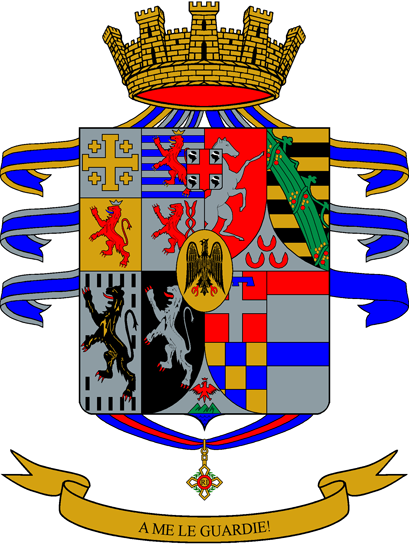
- Regimental coat of arms
- Active: 18 April 1659 — 10 May 1799; 24 May 1814 — 17 Sept. 1943; 15 May 1944 — 21 Aug. 1944; 1 July 1946 — today
- Country: Italy
- Branch: Italian Army
- Part of: Mechanized Brigade "Granatieri di Sardegna"
- Garrison/HQ: Rome
- Motto: "A me le Guardie!"
- Anniversaries: 18 April 1659 – Founding of the Granatieri speciality
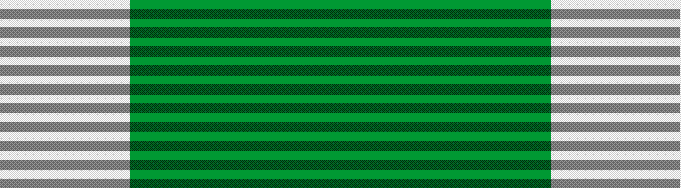
- Decorations: 1× Military Order of Italy; 2× Gold Medals of Military Valor; 3× Silver Medals of Military Valor; 1× Bronze Medal of Military Valor; 1× Silver Medal of Merit

Insignia
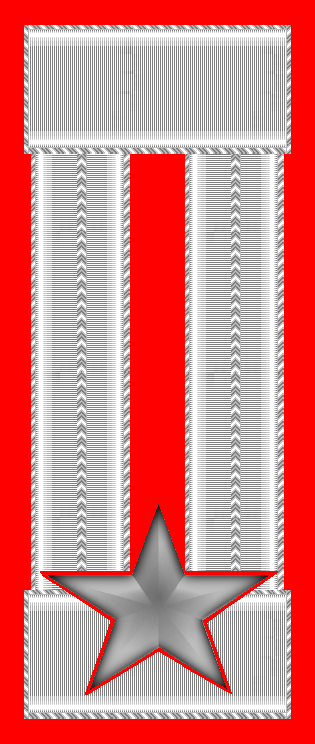
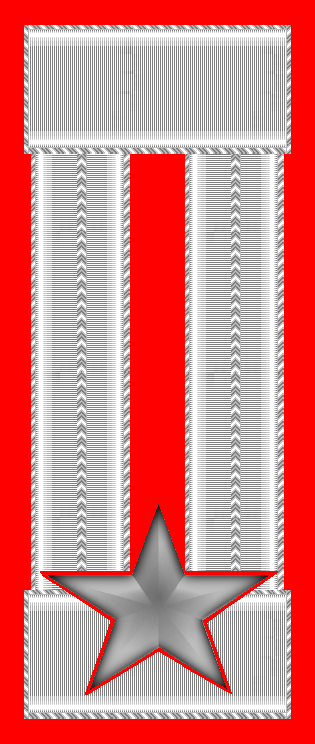
- Granatieri gorget patches

The 1st Regiment "Granatieri di Sardegna" (Italian: 1° Reggimento "Granatieri di Sardegna") is a grenadiers unit of the Italian Army's infantry arm's grenadiers (Italian: Granatieri) speciality. The regiment is based in Rome and assigned to the Mechanized Brigade "Granatieri di Sardegna". The regiment was first formed in 1659 and is the currently oldest active unit of the Italian Army and the most senior regiment in the Italian Army's infantry order of precedence. Together with its sister regiment, the 2nd Regiment "Granatieri di Sardegna", the regiment is the guard regiment of Rome.

In 1659, the Savoyard Army formed the Guard Regiment, which was tasked with guarding the Dukes of Savoy on the battlefield. For the next 140 years the regiment fought in all wars the Duchy of Savoy and then the Kingdom of Sardinia were involved. In 1747, the regiment's I Battalion distinguishing itself in the Battle of Assietta. In 1798, French forces occupied Piedmont and King Charles Emmanuel IV was forced into exile on the island of Sardinia. Afterwards, the regiment was pressed into the service of the French-controlled Piedmontese Republic. In 1799, Austrian forces drove the French from Piedmont and the regiment was disbanded. In 1814, Napoleon was forced to abdicate and King Victor Emmanuel I returned from exile in Sardinia to Turin, where the Guards Regiment was reformed. In 1815, the regiment was used to form the Grenadier Guards Brigade. In 1831, the Grenadier Guards Brigade was renamed Guards Brigade and the brigade's battalions were used to form the 1st Grenadiers Regiment (Guards Brigade), which was joined in the brigade by the 2nd Hunters Regiment (Guards Brigade). In 1848, in preparation for the First Italian War of Independence, the Guards Brigade formed the 2nd Grenadiers Regiment (Guards Brigade), while the battalions of the 2nd Hunters Regiment (Guards Brigade) were assigned to the two grenadier regiments. During the same year, the Guards Brigade formed the 1st Hunters Regiment, which in 1850 left the Guards Brigade and became the Hunters of Sardinia Regiment. Consequently, the Guards Brigade was renamed Grenadiers Brigade. In 1852, the Hunters of Sardinia Regiment was disbanded and its battalions transferred to the regiments of the Grenadiers Brigade, which was renamed Grenadiers of Sardinia Brigade (Italian: Brigata Granatieri di Sardegna).

In 1859, the 1st Grenadiers Regiment (Grenadiers of Sardinia Brigade) fought in the Second Italian War of Independence. In 1860-61, the regiment fought in the Sardinian campaign in central and southern Italy, during which the regiment distinguished itself in the Siege of Gaeta, for which it was awarded Italy's highest military order the Gold Medal of Military Valor. In 1866, the 1st Grenadiers Regiment (Grenadiers of Sardinia Brigade) fought in the Third Italian War of Independence. In 1871, the brigade level was abolished and consequently, the Grenadiers of Sardinia Brigade was disbanded, while the brigade's two regiments were renamed 1st Regiment "Granatieri di Sardegna", respectively 2nd Regiment "Granatieri di Sardegna". In 1881, the brigade level was reintroduced and the two grenadier regiments were renamed 1st Grenadiers Regiment (Brigade "Granatieri di Sardegna"), respectively 2nd Grenadiers Regiment (Brigade "Granatieri di Sardegna").

During World War I the 1st Grenadiers Regiment (Brigade "Granatieri di Sardegna") fought on the Italian front. In May 1916, the brigade fought to annihilation on Monte Cengio during the Austro-Hungarian Army's Asiago Offensive. For the defense of Monte Cengio, the 1st Grenadiers Regiment and its sister regiment, the 2nd Grenadiers Regiment, were both awarded a Gold Medal of Military Valor. In 1926, the Brigade "Granatieri di Sardegna" was renamed XXI Infantry Brigade and the brigade's two regiments were renamed 1st Regiment "Granatieri di Sardegna", respectively 2nd Regiment "Granatieri di Sardegna". During the same year the 3rd Regiment "Granatieri di Sardegna" was formed and assigned to the XXI Infantry Brigade. During World War II the regiment was assigned to the 21st Infantry Division "Granatieri di Sardegna", with which it served in occupied Slovenia. In November 1942, the "Granatieri di Sardegna" division was recalled to Rome. After the announcement of the Armistice of Cassibile on 8 September 1943, the "Granatieri di Sardegna" division fought against invading German forces. On 10 September, after a last stand at Porta San Paolo, the division surrendered to the Germans, which disbanded the division and its regiments a week later.

In 1944, the Italian Co-belligerent Army reformed the regiment for a short time on the island of Sardinia. In 1946, the 1st Regiment "Granatieri di Sardegna" was reformed and assigned to the Infantry Division "Granatieri di Sardegna". In 1976, the regiment was disbanded and its flag and traditions transferred to the 1st Mechanized Grenadiers Battalion "Assietta". The battalion was assigned, together with the 2nd Mechanized Grenadiers Battalion "Cengio" and 3rd Grenadiers Battalion "Guardie", to the Mechanized Brigade "Granatieri di Sardegna". In 1992, the 1st Mechanized Grenadiers Battalion "Assietta" lost its autonomy and entered the reformed 1st Regiment "Granatieri di Sardegna". The regiment's anniversary falls, as for all grenadier units, on 18 April 1659, the day the Granatieri speciality was founded. As the Italian Army's guard unit, the regiment's personnel was required to have a minimum height of 1,90 meters. In 2004, after the suspension of conscription, the height requirement was reduced to 1,85 meters for officers and 1,80 meters for enlisted personnel.

== History ==
=== Formation ===
On 15 February 1657, towards the end of the Franco-Spanish War, which had involved the Duchy of Savoy on the French side, Duke Charles Emmanuel II approved a project to form a Guard Regiment, which would consist of six companies of 100 men per company. On 1 July 1658, the Regiment Badant, which consisted of troops recruited in the Electorate of Bavaria, was disbanded and with only the company led by Lieutenant Colonel Blanc Rocher remaining in active service. On 29 October of the same year, a company owned by the Marquis Fleury was listed in the Savoyard State's expenses as qualified to be incorporated in a Guard Regiment. On 18 April 1659, Duke Charles Emmanuel II ordered to formally establish the Guard Regiment (Italian: Reggimento di Guardia), which would protect the Duke during battles. The Guard Regiment consisted of twelve companies, four of which were transferred from the French Regiment of His Royal Highness, while the remaining companies were the Company Blanc Rocher, the Company Fleury, and six companies formed with the best troops drawn from Savoyard militia regiments. Each company consisted of 100 men. On 31 July of the same year, the four companies of the French Regiment of His Royal Highness entered the new Guard Regiment.

=== Cabinet Wars ===
In 1663, the regiment occupied the Val Pellice and Val Chisone valleys during that year's campaign against the Waldensian rebels. On 19 October 1664, Duke Charles Emmanuel II issued an order of precedence for his military, which ranked the Guard Regiment first among the Savoyard Army's infantry regiments. This gave the regiment the right to march at the head of a column or parade, and regiment placed furthest right on inspection or in a line of battle.

In 1672, the regiment fought in the Second Genoese–Savoyard War. On 2 April 1685, the regiment, which at the time consisted of twenty companies, added six grenadiers to each of its companies. Between 1690 and 1697 the regiment fought in the Nine Years' War against the Kingdom of France. The regiment fought in 1690 in the Battle of Staffarda, in 1693 in the Battle of Marsaglia, in 1693 in the Siege of Pinerolo, and in 1695 in the Siege of Casale. During the Nine Years' War the regiment was reorganized twice: on 2 April 1692, the regiment's twenty companies were divided into two battalions of ten companies each, and on 28 April 1696, the regiment's grenadiers were grouped into two companies, which were then assigned to the regiment's two battalions.

On 31 May 1701, the regiment was reorganized and consisted afterwards of three battalions, each of which fielded six fusilier companies and one grenadiers company. The same year Duke Victor Amadeus II joined the War of the Spanish Succession and the regiment fought in 1701 in the Battle of Chiari and in 1702 in the Battle of Luzzara. On 29 September 1703, the regiment's II Battalion was ambushed and taken prisoner by French troops near San Benedetto Po. The battalion was immediately reformed and in 1704 it fought in the Siege of Vercelli. On 24 July 1704, Vercelli surrendered and the regiment's II Battalion and III Battalion were taken prisoner by the victorious French forces. On 4 August of the same year, the regiment was reorganized and now consisted of two battalions, with six fusilier companies and one grenadiers company per battalion. In 1706, the regiment fought in the Defense of Turin. In 1707 the regiment fought in the Siege of Toulon and, in 1708, the sieges of the forts at Exilles and Fenestrelle. In 1713, the War of the Spanish Succession ended with the Peace of Utrecht, which transferred the Kingdom of Sicily and parts of the Duchy of Milan to Savoy. In October 1713, Victor Amadeus II and his wife, Anne Marie d'Orléans, travelled from Nice to Palermo, where, on 24 December 1713, they were crowned in the cathedral of Palermo King and Queen of Sicily. Afterwards the Guard Regiment moved from Piedmont to Sicily.

In July 1718, Spain landed troops on Sicily and tried to recover the Kingdom of Sicily from Savoy rule. On 2 August 1718, Britain, France, Austria, and Savoy formed an alliance to defeat Spain in the War of the Quadruple Alliance. For the next two year the Guard Regiment fought Spanish forces in Sicily. The war ended in 1720 with the Treaty of The Hague, which restored the position prior to 1717, but with Savoy and Austria exchanging the Kingdom of Sardinia and the Kingdom of Sicily.

In 1733, King Charles Emmanuel III joined the War of the Polish Succession on the French-Spanish side. In 1733, the Guard Regiment fought in the Siege of Pizzighettone and the following Siege of Milan (1733). In 1734, the regiment fought in the Battle of San Pietro and the Battle of Guastalla against Austrian forces.

In 1742, King Charles Emmanuel III joined the War of the Austrian Succession on the Austrian side and the regiment fought in 1742 in the Siege of Mirandola and in 1743 in the First Battle of Casteldelfino. During the same year, 1743, the regiment was renamed Regiment of Guards (Italian: Reggimento delle Guardie). In 1744, the regiment fought in the Battle of Madonna dell'Olmo and in 1745 in the Battle of Bassignano. In 1745-46, the regiment fought in the sieges of Asti, Valenza, and Alessandria. In 1747, the Guard Regiment's I Battalion fought in the decisive Battle of Assietta, where a joint Austro-Sardinian force of 13 battalions defeated a French force of 32 battalions. In 1753, the regiment received white toggles around its uniform buttons to distinguish it from the other infantry regiments. On 21 October 1774, the regiment formed a third battalion, which was disbanded on 15 June 1786. Afterwards the regiment consisted of two battalions, which each fielded four fusiliers and one grenadiers company.

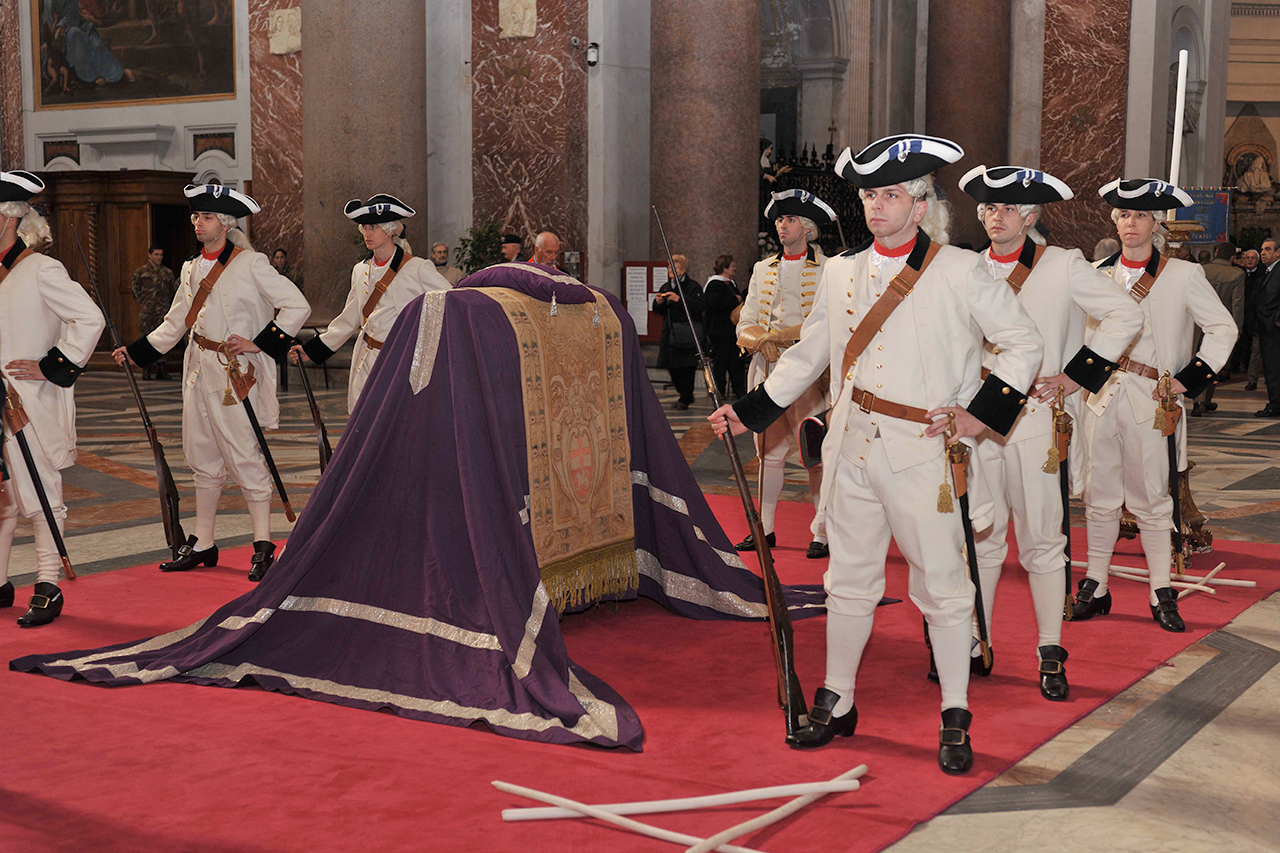
Grenadiers in historical uniform during the mass in memory of Don Alberto Genovese on 18 February 2016

=== French Revolutionary Wars ===
On 21 September 1792, French forces invaded the Duchy of Savoy and on 29 September the County of Nice. Due to these unprovoked attacks King Victor Amadeus III joined the War of the First Coalition against the French Republic. From 1792 to 1796 the regiment fought against the French Army of Italy. In March 1796, Napoleon Bonaparte arrived in Italy and took command of the French forces, with which he defeated the Royal Sardinian Army in the Montenotte campaign within a month. During the Montenotte campaign the regiment fought in the Battle of Ceva and the Battle of Mondovì. After the defeat in the Montenotte campaign King Victor Amadeus III was forced to sign the Treaty of Paris, which ceded the Duchy of Savoy and the County of Nice to France and gave the French Revolutionary Army free passage through the Kingdom of Sardinia towards the rest of Italy.

On 29 November 1798, the War of the Second Coalition began and French forces invaded Piedmont. Already on 6 December 1798, the French occupied Turin and took King Charles Emmanuel IV prisoner. On 8 December 1798, the King was forced to sign a document of abdication, which also ordered his former subjects to recognise French laws and his troops to obey the orders of the French Revolutionary Army. Afterwards, King Charles Emmanuel IV was released and went into exile on the island of Sardinia, while his former territories became the French controlled Piedmontese Republic. On 9 December 1798, the Sardinian troops were released from their oath of allegiance to the King and sworn to the Piedmontese Republic. The only exceptions were the Regiment of Sardinia and the Corps of Light Dragoons of Sardinia, which were both based in Sardinia and thus out of reach of the French Army. On 8 February 1799, the Regiment of Guards was integrated into the newly formed 1st Light Piedmontese Demi-brigade, which in spring 1799 fought with the French against the Austrians. On 5 April 1799, the French lost the Battle of Magnano and were forced out of Italy. With the French retreat the Piedmontese Republic dissolved and the 1st Light Piedmontese Demi-brigade, like all military units sworn to the Piedmontese Republic, was disbanded on 10 May 1799 by the victorious Austrians.

After the Austrian and Russian armies had entered Turin, the Austrians began to form new regiments with Piedmontese personnel. On 10 June 1799, two companies were formed with personnel, that had served in the Regiment of Guards. On 4 September 1799, the process to form a Battalion of Guards with former members of the Regiment of Guards commenced. On 20 February 1800, the Battalion of Guards, which consisted of seven companies of four officers and 115 troops per company, was officially formed. On 26 May 1800, the battalion fought against the French vanguard at Chiusella and then retreated to the city of Turin. On 14 June 1800, Napoleon defeated the Austrians in the Battle of Marengo and forced the Austrians to retreat from Piedmont. On 24 June 1800, the Guards battalion was disbanded, its personnel pressed into French service and assigned to four Piedmontese infantry battalions, two of which were assigned to the French 111th Demi-brigade the Line, while the other two were assigned to 112th Demi-brigade of the Line.

=== Restoration ===
On 11 April 1814, Napoleon abdicated and one month later, on 20 May 1814, King Victor Emmanuel I returned from exile in Sardinia to Turin. On 24 May 1814, Victor Emmanuel I ordered to reform the regiments of the Royal Sardinian Army, which had existed in 1798. By July 1814, the I Battalion of the new Guards Regiment had been formed. The battalion consisted of four fusiliers, one hunters, and one grenadiers company. On 1 January 1815, the Guards Regiment's formation was completed with the formation of the II Battalion.

On 26 February 1815, Napoleon escaped from Elba and landed on 1 March 1815 in Golfe-Juan in France. This triggered the War of the Seventh Coalition, which the Kingdom of Sardinia joined against France. The Guards Regiment participated in the war's Hundred Days campaign, during which the regiment fought on 6 July at Grenoble.

In 1815, the Royal Sardinian Army disbanded its 15 provincial militia regiments and their battalions were assigned to the army's regular regiments. Consequently, on 1 November 1815, all Sardinian infantry regiment were renamed brigades. Each brigade consisted of two battalions in peacetime and four reserve battalions, which would be mobilized in wartime. Each of the disbanded provincial militia regiments included two grenadier companies, 16 of which were transferred on 20 November 1815 to the Guards Brigade. Consequently, on 20 January 1816, King Victor Emmanuel I decreed that the brigade would be renamed Grenadier Guards Brigade.

=== 1831 reform ===
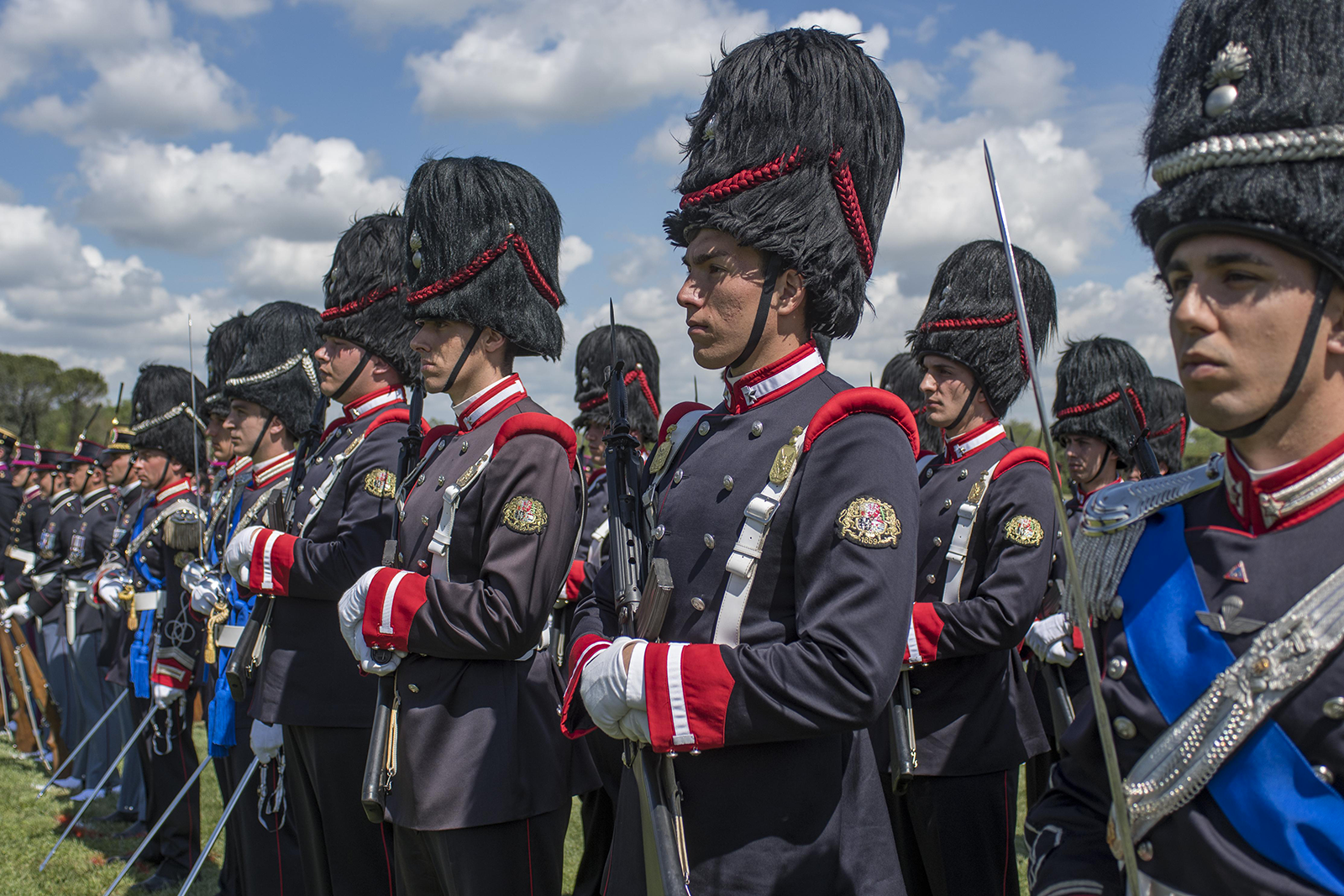
1st Regiment "Granatieri di Sardegna" troops with the bearskin cap introduced in 1834

In 1831, the new King Charles Albert ordered that the uniform of the Grenadier Guards Brigade be modified and the white toggles be replaced with white gorget patches, which are still worn by the Italian Army's grenadiers today. On 25 October of the same year, all infantry brigades of the Royal Sardinian Army divided their battalions into two newly formed regiments. However, as the Grenadier Guards Brigade, which consisted of only two battalions, was too small to split into two regiments, the brigade's two battalion entered the newly formed the 1st Grenadiers Regiment (Guards Brigade), which was joined in the brigade by the Hunter Guards Regiment, which upon entering the brigade was renamed 2nd Hunters Regiment (Guards Brigade). The 1st Grenadiers Regiment (Guards Brigade) consisted of a depot and two battalions, with five grenadier companies and one guards company per battalion, while the 2nd Hunters Regiment (Guards Brigade) consisted of a depot in Sardinia and two battalions, with five hunter companies and one Carabinieri company per battalion.

On 8 October 1833, the depot of the 1st Grenadiers Regiment (Guards Brigade) was established in Turin. On 21 January 1834, the depot's personnel formed the regiment's III Battalion and a new IV Battalion was formed as the regiment's depot unit. During the same year the regiment's battalions were reorganized and consisted afterwards of six grenadier companies. Also in 1834, the regiment added bearskin caps to its parade and guard uniform. In 1839, the 1st Grenadiers Regiment (Guards Brigade) grew to four battalions and a depot battalion, while the 2nd Hunters Regiment (Guards Brigade) grew to three battalions and a depot battalion. As the 2nd Hunters Regiment (Guards Brigade) had its roots in Sardinia the regiment's depot battalion and III Battalion were based on the island, while the regiment's headquarters, I Battalion, and II Battalion were based in Piedmont.

=== Italian Wars of Independence ===
==== First Italian War of Independence ====
On 23 March 1848, the First Italian War of Independence between the Kingdom of Sardinia and the Austrian Empire began. At the outbreak of the war the 2nd Hunters Regiment (Guards Brigade) was renamed 2nd Grenadiers Regiment (Guards Brigade) and the Guards Brigade reorganized its units. Afterwards, the 1st Grenadiers Regiment (Guards Brigade) consisted of the I Grenadiers Battalion, III Grenadiers Battalion, and I Hunters Battalion; while the 2nd Grenadiers Regiment (Guards Brigade) consisted of the II Grenadiers Battalion, IV Grenadiers Battalion, and II Hunters Battalion. In this form the brigade fought in 1848 in the battles of Pastrengo, Santa Lucia, Goito, Sommacampagna, Staffalo, Custoza, and Milan. On 30 May 1848, during the Battle of Goito, Crown Prince and Duke of Savoy Victor Emmanuel placed himself in front of the 2nd Grenadiers Regiment and with the cry "A me le Guardie" ("Guards on me") charged the Austrian lines, followed by the grenadiers of both regiments. The duke's battle cry has since been the motto of the Italian grenadiers. On 9 August 1848, the first campaign of the war ended with the Armistice of Salasco and the Royal Sardinian Army retreated from the Kingdom of Lombardy–Venetia.

On 14 October 1848, the Guards Brigade formed the 1st Hunters Regiment (Guards Brigade), which received the I Hunters Battalion and II Hunters Battalion. On 6 February 1849, the 1st Grenadiers Regiment (Guards Brigade) formed the I Provisional Grenadier Guards Battalion, while the 2nd Grenadiers Regiment (Guards Brigade) formed the II Provisional Grenadier Guards Battalion. On 10 February 1849, the two provisional battalions were used to form the Provisional Grenadier Guards Regiment. On 11 March 1849, the Provisional Grenadier Guards Regiment was renamed 3rd Grenadier Guards Regiment. On 20 March 1849, the second campaign of the war began and the next day, on 21 March 1849, the Guards Brigade fought in the Mortara. Two days later, on 23 March 1849, the brigade fought in the decisive Battle of Novara. After the defeat at Novara, King Charles Albert of Sardinia abdicated in favour of his son Victor Emmanuel, who ascended the throne as Victor Emmanuel II. On 24 March, the new King met with the Austrian Field Marshal Joseph Radetzky at Vignale and agreed to an armistice, which ended the First Italian War of Independence. On 1 June 1849, the 3rd Grenadier Guards Regiment and its two battalions were disbanded.

On 12 October 1849, the 1st Grenadiers Regiment (Guards Brigade) and 2nd Grenadiers Regiment (Guards Brigade) were reduced to a staff and two battalions each, with four grenadiers and one guards company per battalion. On 20 April 1850, the 1st Hunters Regiment left the Guards Brigade and was renamed Hunters of Sardinia Regiment (Italian: Reggimento Cacciatori di Sardegna). On the same day the Guards Brigade was renamed Grenadiers Brigade, while its two remaining regiments were renamed 1st Grenadiers Regiment (Grenadiers Brigade) and 2nd Grenadiers Regiment (Grenadiers Brigade).

On 16 March 1852, the Hunters of Sardinia Regiment was disbanded and its battalions transferred to the two regiments of the Grenadiers Brigade, which was renamed on the same day Grenadiers of Sardinia Brigade (Italian: Brigata Granatieri di Sardegna). The traditions of the Hunters of Sardinia Regiment were assigned to the 2nd Grenadiers Regiment (Grenadiers of Sardinia Brigade). Afterwards the two grenadier regiments consisted of a staff and four battalions, with each battalion fielding four companies.

In 1855, the Kingdom of Sardinia joined the Crimean War against the Russian Empire and the Royal Sardinian Army formed the Sardinian expeditionary corps, which was sent to Crimea. For the war, the first company of each of the 1st Grenadiers Regiment's four battalions, namely the 1st, 5th, 9th, and 13th companies, were used to form the I Battalion of the 1st Provisional Regiment. Likewise, the first companies of the 2nd Grenadiers Regiment's four battalions, were used to form the II Battalion of the 1st Provisional Regiment. Afterwards, both grenadier regiments grouped their remaining companies into three battalions. Between 9 and 14 May 1855, the Sardinian expeditionary corps disembarked in Balaklava in Crimea. After minor skirmishes against Russian troops, the Sardinian forces distinguished themselves on 16 August 1855 in the Battle of the Chernaya. In June 1856, the Sardinian expeditionary corps returned to Piedmont and, on 18 June 1856, the grenadier companies returned to their respective regiments, which on the same day resumed their original organization of four battalions of four companies each.

==== Second Italian War of Independence ====
On 9 March 1859, in preparation for the Second Italian War of Independence, both regiments of the Grenadiers of Sardinia Brigade formed an additional depot in Alessandria. Initially each depot consisted of a staff and two grenadier companies, with a third company being formed. On 26 April 1859, the war began and the brigade fought in the Battle of Solferino and the Battle of Peschiera. On 25 June 1859, both depots in Alessandria formed a fourth company. On 12 July 1859, the war ended with the Armistice of Villafranca, which included the transfer of Lombardy from the Austrian Empire to the Second French Empire, which in turn would transfer it to the Kingdom of Sardinia.

On 1 November 1859, the 1st Grenadiers Regiment (Grenadiers of Sardinia Brigade) ceded its II and IV Battalion to help form the 3rd Grenadiers Regiment (Grenadiers of Lombardy Brigade), while the 2nd Grenadiers Regiment (Grenadiers of Sardinia Brigade) ceded its II and IV Battalion to help form the 4th Grenadiers Regiment (Grenadiers of Lombardy Brigade). On 5 November of the same year, the regiments of the Grenadiers of Sardinia Brigade reformed the ceded battalions and afterwards, all four grenadier regiments consisted of four battalions of four companies per battalion.

In fall of 1860, the Grenadiers of Sardinia Brigade participated in the Sardinian campaign in central and southern Italy, during which the brigade participated on 11 September 1860 in the occupation of Città di Castello, fought on 14 September in the Battle of Perugia, occupied on 16 September Foligno, and attacked papal forces on 17 September at Spoleto. From 24 to 29 September 1860, the brigade fought in the Siege of Ancona and on 4 November 1860 in the Battle of Mola. From 5 November 1860 to 13 February 1861, the brigade fought in the Siege of Gaeta. For its conduct in the Battle of Mola the 1st Grenadiers Regiment (Grenadiers of Sardinia Brigade) was awarded a Gold Medal of Military Valor and for its conduct in the Battle of Perugia a Silver Medal of Military Valor. Additionally the regiment's medical corps was awarded a Bronze Medal of Military Valor for its conduct at Perugia.

On 27 January 1861, the Kingdom of Sardinia annexed the Kingdom of the Two Sicilies and, on 17 March of the same year, King Victor Emmanuel II proclaimed himself King of Italy. On 16 April 1861, the two grenadier regiments of the Grenadiers of Sardinia Brigade ceded their IV battalions to help form the 5th Grenadiers Regiment (Grenadiers of Naples Brigade), while on the same day the two regiments of the Grenadiers of Lombardy Brigade ceded their IV battalions to help form the 6th Grenadiers Regiment (Grenadiers of Naples Brigade). Initially the six grenadier regiments consisted of a staff and three battalions, with four grenadier companies per battalion, but on 26 November 1861, each battalion formed a fifth company, and then in February 1862, each battalion formed a sixth company. After the six grenadier regiments consisted of a staff and three battalions, with six grenadier companies per battalion.

On 1 August 1862, the 1st, 3rd, and 5th grenadier regiments ceded their 17th and 18th companies to help form the 7th Grenadiers Regiment (Grenadiers of Tuscany Brigade), while the 2nd, 4th, and 6th grenadier regiments ceded their 17th and 18th companies to help form the 8th Grenadiers Regiment (Grenadiers of Tuscany Brigade). Furthermore, all line infantry regiments of the Royal Italian Army transferred their tallest soldiers to the grenadier regiments, which used the influx of new personnel to reform their 17th and 18th companies, respectively the remaining companies of the regiments of the Grenadiers of Tuscany Brigade. Afterwards, all eight grenadier regiments consisted of a staff and three battalions, with six grenadier companies per battalion.

Between 1861 and 1865, the 1st Grenadiers Regiment (Grenadiers of Sardinia Brigade) operated in southern Italy to suppress the anti-Sardinian revolt, which had erupted in Southern Italy after the annexation of the Kingdom of the Two Sicilies.

==== Third Italian War of Independence ====
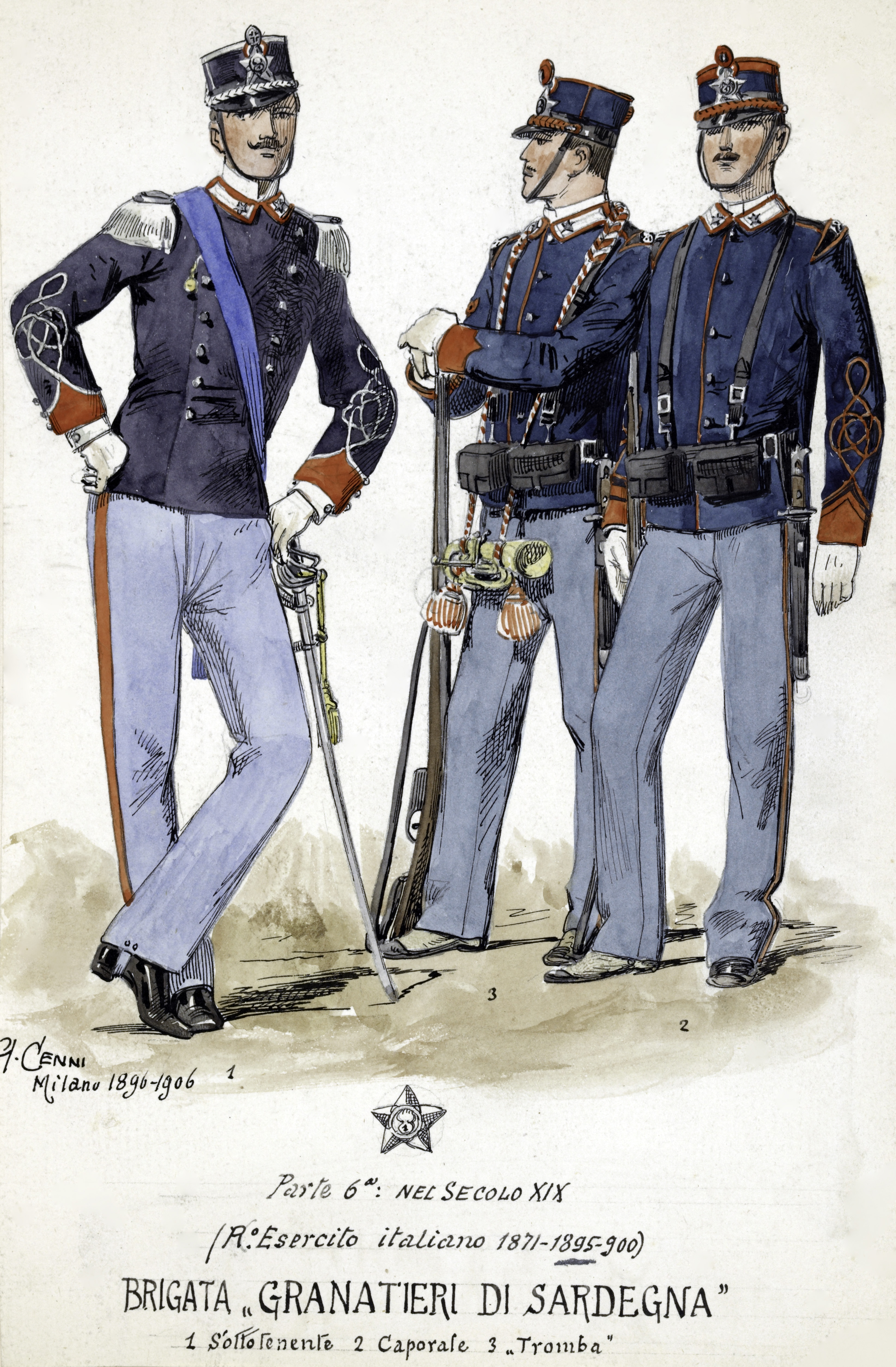
Brigade "Granatieri di Sardegna" Second Lieutenant, NCO & bugler in the grenadier's uniform between 1871 and 1895

In 1866, the Grenadiers of Sardinia Brigade participated in the Third Italian War of Independence, during which the brigade fought in the Battle of Custoza.

On 5 March 1871, all Royal Italian Army infantry regiments were reorganized and now consisted of a staff company, a depot company, and three battalions, with four companies per battalion. On 1 April 1871, the grenadier regiments of the Grenadiers of Lombardy, Grenadiers of Naples, and Grenadiers of Tuscany brigades were transferred to the line infantry. On 15 October of the same year, the brigade level was abolished and the two grenadier regiments of the Grenadiers of Sardinia Brigade were renamed 1st Regiment "Granatieri di Sardegna", respectively 2nd Regiment "Granatieri di Sardegna".

On 2 January 1881, the brigade level was reintroduced and the two regiments were renamed as 1st Grenadiers Regiment (Brigade "Granatieri di Sardegna") and 2nd Grenadiers Regiment (Brigade "Granatieri di Sardegna").

In 1895-96, the regiment provided eleven officers and 332 enlisted for units deployed to Italian Eritrea for the First Italo-Ethiopian War. In 1902, the Brigade "Granatieri di Sardegna" moved to Rome. In December 1908, the regiment was deployed to the area of the Strait of Messina for the recovery efforts after the 1908 Messina earthquake. For its service the regiment was awarded a Silver Medal of Merit, which was affixed to the regiment's flag.

=== Italo-Turkish War ===
In 1911, the 1st Grenadiers Regiment's III Battalion was deployed, together with the 2nd Grenadiers Regiment's III Battalion, to Libya for the Italo-Turkish War. On 26 October 1911, the battalion fought at Tripoli, on 26 November 1911, at Henni Mesri, and on 4 December 1911 in the Battle of Ain Zara. While the battalion was deployed to Libya, the depot of the 1st Grenadiers Regiment in Rome formed the IV Battalion as replacement. In 1912, the III Battalion fought on 18 January at Gargarish, on 26-28 June in the occupation of Sidi Said, and on 15 July in the Battle of Sidi Alo. On 1 March 1913, the battalion participated in the occupation of El Agheila. From 12-26 May 1915, the III Battalion fought in the defense of Misrata. On 20 October 1917, the III Battalion was disbanded in Libya, while the regiment's IV Battalion was renumbered as III Battalion.

=== World War I ===
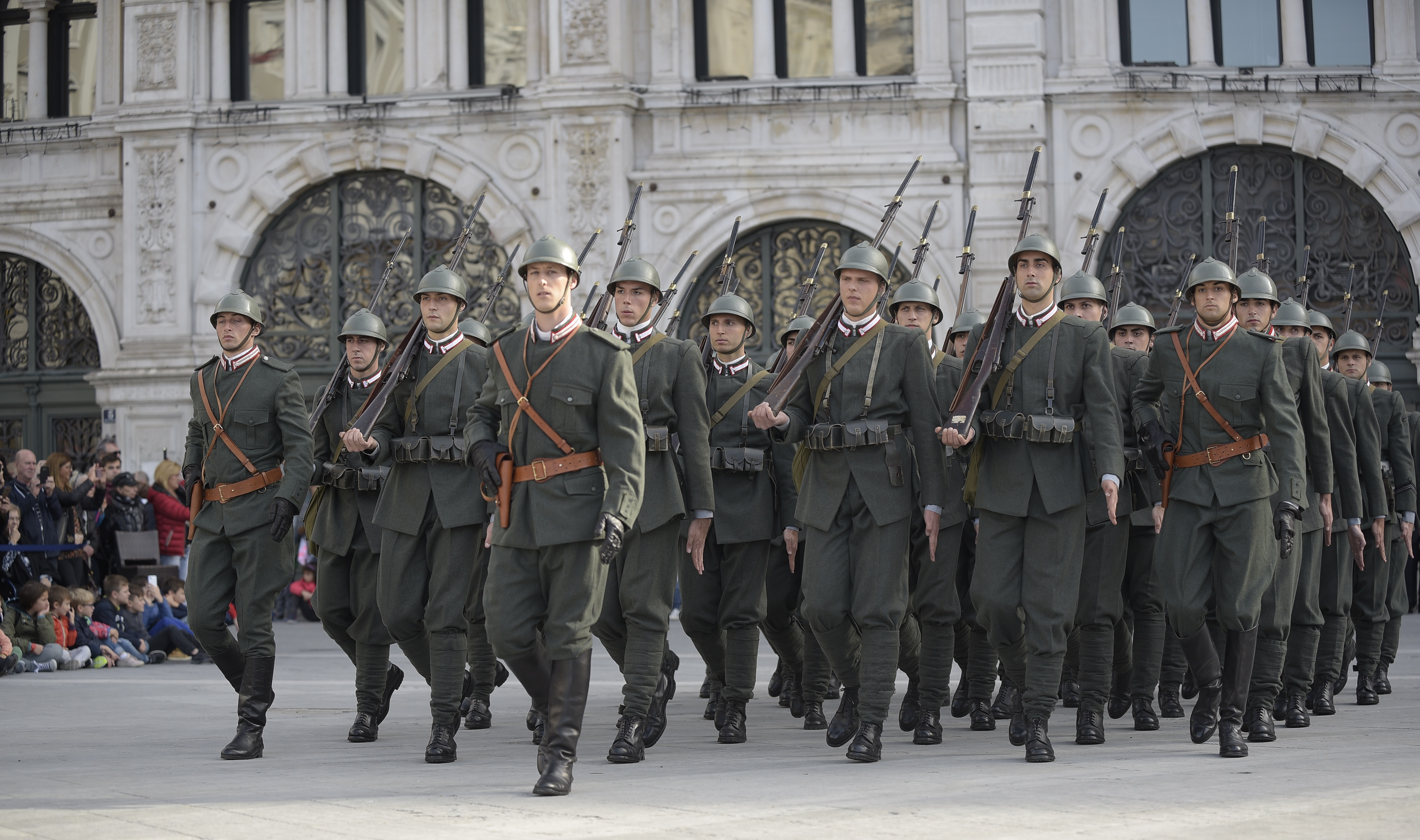
1st Regiment "Granatieri di Sardegna" platoon in World War I uniform during a ceremony in Trieste 2018

==== 1915 ====
At the outbreak of World War I, the Brigade "Granatieri di Sardegna" formed, together with the Brigade "Messina" and the 31st Field Artillery Regiment, the 13th Division. At the time the 1st Grenadiers Regiment (Brigade "Granatieri di Sardegna") consisted of the I, II, and IV battalions, each of which fielded four grenadier companies and one machine gun section. On 23 May 1915, Italy entered the war and the Brigade "Granatieri di Sardegna" was deployed, as per tradition, on the extreme right of the Italian front at Monfalcone on the shores of the Adriatic Sea. On 5 June 1915, the brigade crossed the lower Isonzo river at Pieris and advanced to the foot of the Karst plateau, which blocked the way to the city of Trieste. In the afternoon of 8 June, the brigade attacked the Austro-Hungarian Army positions above Monfalcone. The attack was abandoned the next day after the 1st Grenadiers Regiment had suffered 282 casualties.

In June 1915, the brigade fought in the First Battle of the Isonzo, during which the brigade unsuccessfully attacked the Austro-Hungarian held Height 121 and Height 85 above Monfalcone. On 18 July 1915, the Second Battle of the Isonzo began, for which the 1st Grenadiers Regiment's IV Battalion was attached to the 93rd Infantry Regiment (Brigade "Messina"). On 21 July 1915, the IV Battalion attacked, together with the III Battalion of the 93rd Infantry Regiment, Height 70 on the slopes of the Karst plateau. The attack was renewed the next day with troops of the 17th Infantry Regiment (Brigade "Acqui"). On 10 August 1915, the 1st Grenadiers Regiment's I Battalion attacked Height 121, while the 2nd Grenadiers Regiment's III Battalion attacked Height 85. While the latter attack failed already in its initial stages, the I Battalion managed to reach its objective and take it. However, the battalion was soon cut off and Austro-Hungarian reinforcements forced the battalion's surviving five officers and 152 grenadiers to surrender. On 23 August 1915, the brigade was pulled out of the front and sent to Palmanova in the rear, where the 1st Grenadiers Regiment's I Battalion was brought back to full strength.

On 26 October 1915, the brigade was sent to the Sabotin hill to replace units, that had become combat ineffective during the ongoing Third Battle of the Isonzo. On 28 and 29 October and then on 1 and 2 November, the brigade's troops attacked enemy positions on the slopes of the Sabotin. All four attacks failed at the cost of 1,069 casualties. On 10 November 1915, the Italians began the Fourth Battle of the Isonzo and the Brigade "Granatieri di Sardegna" attacked Height 188 in the Oslavia sector. Between 10 and 18 November, the brigade attacked the Height unsuccessfully every day. On 20 November 1915, the brigade renewed its attack and finally took the position. The next day, on 21 November 1915, the exhausted brigade, which had lost 854 men in the preceding attacks, withstood a series of Austro-Hungarian counterattacks. The next day, on 22 November, the brigade was taken out of the front and sent to Pasian Schiavonesco for a period of rest and rebuilding.

==== 1916 ====
On 23 January 1916, the brigade returned to the front and occupied trenches near San Floriano del Collio. On 29 March 1916, Austro-Hungarian troops launched a surprise attack on the brigade's first line near the hamlet of Lenzuolo Bianco and the 1st Grenadiers Regiment's II Battalion and the 2nd Grenadiers Regiment's I Battalion were forced to fall back to the second Italian trench line. The Brigade "Granatieri di Sardegna", supported by the I Battalion of the 7th Infantry Regiment (Brigade "Cuneo"), immediately counterattacked and drove the Austro-Hungarian troops out of the Italian lines at the cost of 690 casualties.

On 20 April 1916, the brigade was sent to Percoto for a period of rest. On 15 May 1916, the Austro-Hungarian Army launched the Asiago Offensive on the Asiago plateau, which quickly forced the Italian forces on the plateau to retreat. On 22 May, the Brigade "Granatieri di Sardegna" moved by train to Bassano and from there by truck to the Asiago plateau. On the plateau the brigade was ordered to from a defensive line between the summits of Monte Cengio and Monte Lemerle, with the 1st Grenadiers Regiment holding the line from Monte Cengio to the Canaglia Valley and the 2nd Grenadiers Regiment holding the line to the East of the valley towards Monte Lemerle. On 29 May, Treschè Conca fell to the advancing Austro-Hungarian troops and the 2nd Grenadiers Regiment's II Battalion came under sustained attack as the Austro-Hungarians attempted to advance to Monte Cengio. The fierce battle intensified on 30 and 31 May, as the Austro-Hungarians tried to break through the grenadiers' line, which was the last Italian position before the Venetian Plain. By 1 June 1916, the Brigade "Granatieri di Sardegna", together with elements hastily drawn from the Brigade "Campobasso", Brigade "Pescara", Brigade "Catanzaro", and Brigade "Trapani", still held the line between Monte Cengio and Monte Lemerle, although fresh Austro-Hungarian units incessantly pressed the attack. On 3 June, Austro-Hungarian infantry began to envelop the Italian line running along the Cesuna-Magnaboschi road, which was held by the 1st Grenadiers Regiment's IV Battalion and the 2nd Grenadiers Regiment's I Battalion. By noon the two battalions were surrounded and forced to surrender, while the staff of the 2nd Grenadiers Regiment managed to escape the encirclement. At the same time, the remaining grenadiers continued to hold the line running towards Monte Cengio. To shorten the Italian line the remaining Italian troops on the eastern side of the Canaglia Valley were ordered to fall back to the summit of Monte Pau, where on 4 June, with the help of two battalions of the 211th Infantry Regiment (Brigade "Pescara"), a new line was established. On 7 June, the 95th Infantry Regiment (Brigade "Udine") arrived and replaced the shattered Brigade "Granatieri di Sardegna", whose survivors were grouped into a single battalion. The defense of the line between Monte Cengio and Monte Lemerle had cost the Brigade "Granatieri di Sardegna" 4,615 casualties out of approximately 6,000 men the brigade fielded, when it arrived on the Asiago Plateau.

After being reformed in the front's rear, the Brigade "Granatieri di Sardegna" returned to the Isonzo front for the Sixth Battle of the Isonzo. On 6 August 1916, the Italian VI Army Corps attacked towards the city of Gorizia, while the Italian XI Army Corps attacked towards Monte San Michele on the Karst plateau. Already by nightfall of the same day, the battalions of the Brigade "Brescia", Brigade "Ferrara", and Brigade "Catanzaro" reached the Monte San Michele summit ridge. During the night between 6 and 7 August, the 1st Grenadiers Regiment, and the following morning the 2nd Grenadiers Regiment were sent forward to support the Brigade "Catanzaro", which was facing heavy Austro-Hungarian counterattacks. On 10 August, the Austro-Hungarian forces abandoned their attempts to retake Monte San Michele and fell back to their second line of defense along the summits of Nad Logem, Veliki Hribach, and Pečinka. Between 11 and 14 August 1916, the grenadiers tried to break into the new Austro-Hungarian line, but the heavy losses the brigade had suffered in the preceding days and exhaustion prevented any success. In the evening of 14 August, the Brigade "Granatieri di Sardegna", which had lost 3,616 men, was taken out of the front. The brigade's survivors were grouped into a single regiment of two battalions, which remained on the Karst plateau as reserve. On 22 August, the brigade's remnants moved to Versa in the front's rear, where it incorporated replacement troops sent by the brigade's depots in Rome. Already three days later, on 25 August 1916, the brigade was back on the Karst plateau below Veliki Hribach.

On 14 September 1916, the Seventh Battle of the Isonzo began and the brigade attacked the Austro-Hungarian line between the hill of Miren Castle and Veliki Hribach. On 14 September, the 1st Grenadiers Regiment's IV Battalion and a battalion of the 76th Infantry Regiment (Brigade "Napoli") stormed the hill of Miren Castle. On 16 and 17 September, the grenadiers attempted to continue their advance, but fierce Austro-Hungarian resistance prevented further gains. The brigade, which had suffered 1,674 casualties, was sent to Clauiano and Jalmicco, where it remained during the Eight Battle of the Isonzo and Ninth Battle of the Isonzo as reserve unit. On 3 November 1916, the brigade returned to the front at Hudi Log to replace units, which had been shattered during the Ninth Battle of the Isonzo. On 28 December 1916, both regiments of the Brigade "Granatieri di Sardegna" were awarded a Silver Medal of Military Valor for their conduct during the first two years of the war.

==== 1917 ====
From 12 to 22 May 1917, at the beginning of the Tenth Battle of the Isonzo, the Brigade "Granatieri di Sardegna" was held in reserve. On 22 May the brigade moved to the Karst plateau, where the next day, on 23 May, the 1st Grenadiers Regiment's I Battalion entered the frontline to the West of the village of Sela na Krasu. The battalion participated, together with the 114th Infantry Regiment (Brigade "Mantova") and the Brigade "Padova", in an attack, that drove the Austro-Hungarians out of some heights. However, during the night between the 23 and 24 May, an Austro-Hungarian counterattack pushed the Italians back to their starting lines. On 24 May, both regiments of the "Granatieri di Sardegna", as well as the brigades "Mantova" and "Padova", attacked the same heights once more in an attempt to reach Sela na Krasu. After taking the heights, further attacks were defeated by the strong Austro-Hungarian defense, and an enemy counterattack drove the Italian forces off the key Height 241. Immediately the 2nd Grenadiers Regiment's I Battalion was sent forward and retook Height 241. The next day, on 25 May, the grenadiers again tried to open a way to Sela na Krasu, but quickly the futility of further attacks became obvious and the exhausted Italian forces were ordered to fortify the conquered positions. On 3 June 1917, the 1st Grenadiers Regiment's I Battalion defeated a surprise Austro-Hungarian attack, and the next day the brigade was ordered to the rear. During the night between 4 and 5 June, the Brigade "Granatieri di Sardegna" was replaced by the 70th Infantry Regiment (Brigade "Ancona") and the 139th Infantry Regiment (Brigade "Bari"). However already the next day, on 6 June 1917, the grenadiers were sent back into the first line to stop the Austro-Hungarian counterattack at Flondar, which had already succeeded in driving the Italians off of some of the recently conquered heights. The 1st Grenadiers Regiment's IV Battalion, together with parts of the 139th Infantry Regiment (Brigade "Bari"), in a ferocious counterattack retook the heights. Afterwards, the grenadiers had to be taken out of the front as they had suffered 3,201 casualties since 23 May.

On 24 June 1917, the brigade, which was back at full strength, returned to the first line on the heights to the West of Sela na Krasu. On 15 and 16 July 1917, the 2nd Grenadiers Regiment's II Battalion, and the 5th Company of the 1st Grenadiers Regiment's II Battalion participated, together with the Brigade "Siena" and Brigade "Bari", in an unsuccessful attack to push the Austro-Hungarian lines back from the Italian controlled Height 241. On 22 July 1917, the brigade was sent to the rear to prepare for the Eleventh Battle of the Isonzo. On 13 August 1917, the brigade returned to the Karst plateau in the area of Sela na Krasu. On the third day of the Eleventh Battle of the Isonzo, on 19 August, the brigade attacked towards the hill of Stari Lokva. The grenadiers quickly overran the first two Austro-Hungarian trench lines, but could not advance to the third line due to withering enemy machine gun fire. The next day, on 20 August, the brigade renewed its attack and took the third Austrian trench line. The brigade then entrenched itself in the conquered positions, and on 23 August, the brigade was sent to the rear to replace the 2,171 men it had lost in the previous days.

On 20 October 1917, the 1st Grenadiers Regiment's III Battalion, which had remained in Libya after the Italo-Turkish War, was disbanded, and the regiment's IV Battalion was renumbered as III Battalion. On 24 October 1917, Austro-Hungarian forces, reinforced by German units, commenced the Battle of Caporetto. The German forces were able to break into the Italian front line at Caporetto and rout the Italian forces opposing them, which forced the Italian armies along the Isonzo river and in the Julian Alps to retreat behind the Piave river. The Brigade "Granatieri di Sardegna" was tasked with covering the retreat of the Italian 3rd Army from the Karst plateau and the lower Isonzo river towards the Piave river. During the retreat the brigade continuously clashed with Austro-Hungarian and German units and on 30 October the commander of the 2nd Grenadiers Regiment, Colonel Emidio Spinucci, fell in combat against enemy forces. On 31 October, the brigade crossed the Tagliamento river and, on 5 November, the brigade took up positions along the Livenza river between Lorenzaga and Meduna di Livenza to prevent the Austro-Hungarians from crossing the Livenza. Two days later, the Austro-Hungarians crossed the Livenza at San Stino di Livenza and the Brigade "Granatieri di Sardegna" retreated across the Monticano river. On 8 November, the brigade was ordered to retreat behind the Piavon canal. However, while the 2nd Grenadiers Regiment successfully reached the new Italian line, the 1st Grenadiers Regiment was overtaken by the enemy's vanguard and most of its troops captured. On 9 November 1917, the remnants of the brigade, which had suffered 2,895 casualties during the retreat, crossed the Piave river. The brigade then moved to Monastier di Treviso, where over the next weeks it was rebuilt.

==== 1918 ====
On 14 January 1918, the 2nd Grenadiers Regiment's II Battalion was ordered to expand the Italian held bridgehead at Capo Sile. The grenadiers succeeded in their task, but on 16 January, a strong Austro-Hungarian counterattack broke into the Italian lines and the rest of the 2nd Grenadiers Regiment, reinforced by troops of the 13th Bersaglieri Regiment, the II Cyclists Battalion of the 2nd Bersaglieri Regiment, and the VII Cyclists Battalion of the 7th Bersaglieri Regiment, managed to defeat the attack. In June 1918, the Brigade "Granatieri di Sardegna" was kept in reserve during the Second Battle of the Piave River. On 2 July 1918, the brigade was ordered to cross the old Piave river at Capo Sile and drive the Austro-Hungarian forces back over the new Piave river. The grenadiers crossed the old Piave river and in a slow hard fight the Italians, which continuously reinforced their troops with fresh brigades, attrited the Austro-Hungarians, which on 6 July fled to the northern shore of the new Piave river. After reaching the bed of the new piave river the grenadiers, which had suffered 954 casualties, were sent to the rear for a period of rest.

On 23 October 1918, the brigade was assigned to the XXVI Army Corps as the corps' reserve unit for the upcoming Battle of Vittorio Veneto. On 24 October, the Italian divisions attacked all along the Piave front and on 30 October the XXVI Army Corps began to cross the new Piave river to pursue the fleeing Austro-Hungarians. On 2 November 1918, the 1st Grenadiers Regiment reached Portogruaro and Concordia Sagittaria and the next day the regiment forded the Tagliamento river at San Michele al Tagliamento and established a bridgehead at Latisanotta. On 4 November 1918, the war ended with the Armistice of Villa Giusti and the 1st Grenadiers Regiment stopped its advance at San Giorgio di Nogaro, where also the 2nd Grenadiers Regiment arrived later on the same day.

Over the course of the war the Brigade "Granatieri di Sardegna" suffered 26,258 men killed, wounded and missing — the second highest number of casualties among Italian infantry brigades after the Brigade "Salerno". After the war, the 1st Grenadiers Regiment (Brigade "Granatieri di Sardegna") and the 2nd Grenadiers Regiment (Brigade "Granatieri di Sardegna") were both awarded a Gold Medal of Military Valor for their conduct and sacrifice on Monte Cengio between 22 May and 3 June 1916, and for their conduct and sacrifice on the Karst plateau between 23 May and 7 June 1917.

=== Interwar years ===
On 17 November 1918, the Brigade "Granatieri di Sardegna" arrived in Rijeka and, together with French, British, and American troops, occupied the city. On 25 August 1919, the 2nd Grenadiers Regiment left the city, followed by the 1st Grenadiers Regiment two day later on 27 August. However the Brigade "Granatieri di Sardegna" did not return to its bases in Rome, but took up garrisons between the cities of Gradisca d'Isonzo and Trieste. The 2nd Grenadiers Regiment's I Battalion was sent to the town of Ronchi, at the foot of the Karst plateau. On 31 August 1919, seven of the battalion's junior officers swore the "Oath of Ronchi" to fight for the annexation of Rijeka by Italy. The next day Second Lieutenant Claudio Grandjacquet travelled to Venice, where he proposed the grenadiers' plan to occupy Rijeka to the poet and war hero Gabriele D'Annunzio, who enthusiastically accepted to lead, what he dubbed the "Impresa di Fiume" ("Fiume endeavor"). At 18h in the evening of 11 September 1919, D'Annunzio arrived in Ronchi and sent four officers to Palmanova, where they forced the commander of the army's auto park to hand over five Lancia 1ZM armored cars and 35 trucks. After the trucks arrived in Ronchi 186 grenadiers of the I Battalion desert their unit and moved with D'Annunzio to Rijeka, where they arrived the next morning. Troops sent to stop D'Annunzio and the grenadiers, joined D'Annunzio, who soon commanded a force of 2,500 men, with whom he established the Italian Regency of Carnaro in Rijeka. After these events, the Brigade "Granatieri di Sardegna" was quickly transferred to Innsbruck in Austria as occupation force. In July 1920, the grenadiers left Innsbruck and, after a short time in South Tyrol returned to their bases in Rome in November 1920.

On 31 October 1926, the Brigade "Granatieri di Sardegna" was renamed XXI Infantry Brigade, while the brigade's regiments were renamed 1st Regiment "Granatieri di Sardegna", respectively 2nd Regiment "Granatieri di Sardegna". The XXI Infantry Brigade was the infantry component of the 21st Territorial Division of Rome, which also included the 13th Field Artillery Regiment. Infantry brigades formed in 1926 consisted of three regiments and consequently, on 4 November 1926, the 3rd Regiment "Granatieri di Sardegna" was formed in Viterbo and assigned to the XXI Infantry Brigade. The new regiment's I Battalion and depot were formed with personnel ceded by the 1st Regiment "Granatieri di Sardegna", while the II Battalion and regimental command were formed with personnel ceded by the 2nd Regiment "Granatieri di Sardegna". Afterwards, each of the three regiments consisted of a command, a command company, two grenadier battalions, and a depot.

On 8 February 1934, the 21st Territorial Division of Rome was renamed Infantry Division "Granatieri di Sardegna". In 1935-36 the regiment contributed 21 officers and 236 enlisted for units, which were deployed to East Africa for the Second Italo-Ethiopian War. After the end of the war, the depot of the 1st Regiment "Granatieri di Sardegna" in Rome formed the 10th Regiment "Granatieri di Savoia", which was mustered on 12 October 1936 and assigned to the 65th Infantry Division "Granatieri di Savoia" on 26 October 1936. The "Granatieri di Savoia" division was then transferred to Italian occupied Ethiopia to garrison the capital Addis Ababa.

On 6 April 1939, a provisional regiment with elements drawn from all three grenadiers regiments was formed for the Italian invasion of Albania. In the night from 7 to 8 April 1939, a battalion of the provisional regiment was airlifted to Tirana, while the rest of the regiment followed by sea a few days later. In 1939, the Royal Italian Army reorganized its divisions as binary divisions and consequently, the 3rd Regiment "Granatieri di Sardegna" left the Infantry Division "Granatieri di Sardegna" and became an autonomous unit. On 25 July 1939, the 3rd Regiment "Granatieri di Sardegna" moved from Viterbo to Tirana, where it replaced the provisional regiment, which was repatriated and disbanded in Rome on 28 July 1939. During the same year the XXI Infantry Brigade was disbanded and the brigade's two regiments came under direct command of the Infantry Division "Granatieri di Sardegna", which was renamed 21st Infantry Division "Granatieri di Sardegna".

=== World War II ===
==== 21st Infantry Division "Granatieri di Sardegna" ====
At the outbreak of World War II the 1st Regiment "Granatieri di Sardegna" consisted of a command, a command company, three grenadier battalions, a support weapons battery equipped with 65/17 infantry support guns, and a mortar company equipped with 81mm Mod. 35 mortars. In June 1940, during the invasion of France, the 21st Infantry Division "Granatieri di Sardegna" was in the reserve and not involved in any operations.

In May 1941, the division was transferred to Ljubljana, the capital of the Province of Ljubljana, which Italy had annexed after the Axis invasion of Yugoslavia. During its time in Ljubljana the grenadiers repeatedly clashed with Yugoslav partisans. In November 1942, the division was recalled to Rome to defend the city in case the Allies would land forces near the city.

In the evening of 8 September 1943, the Armistice of Cassibile, which ended hostilities between the Kingdom of Italy and the Anglo-American Allies, was announced by General Dwight D. Eisenhower on Radio Algiers and by Marshal Pietro Badoglio on Italian radio. Germany reacted by invading Italy and the 21st Infantry Division "Granatieri di Sardegna", together with the 12th Infantry Division "Sassari" and the Armored Reconnaissance Grouping "Lancieri di Montebello", were ordered to defend Rome against the Germans. The grenadiers manned 13 strong points blocking all the roads to Rome from the West and South. By nightfall the first units of the division were engaged in fierce combat with the German 2nd Fallschirmjäger Division at the Magliana bridge in the Magliana neighborhood on the southern outskirts of Rome. On 9 September, the Germans attacked in full force and the grenadiers, which suffered heavy losses in the fighting, had to abandon the three southernmost strong points. On 10 September 1943, the grenadiers, the Lancieri di Montebello, reinforcements sent by the "Sassari" division, and hundreds of armed civilians fell back to a defensive line before Porta San Paolo for a last stand. Civilians at Porta San Paolo included communist leader Luigi Longo, lawyer Giuliano Vassalli, writer Emilio Lussu, union leaders Vincenzo Baldazzi and Mario Zagari, retired Air Force generals Sabato Martelli Castaldi and Roberto Lordi, and 18-year-old future partisan leader Marisa Musu. The future Italian president Sandro Pertini brought a detachment of Socialist resistance fighters to Porta San Paolo and around 12:30 the Catholic Communist movement arrived with further reinforcements, including famed actor Carlo Ninchi. However, by 17:00 the Germans broke the line of the Italian defenders, who had suffered 570 killed in the fighting. Soon after the Italian military units surrendered as the flight of King Victor Emmanuel III from Rome made further resistance senseless. Before surrendering the Italian soldiers handed thousands of their weapons over to the civilian population, which was quick to form an organized resistance movement in the city. On 17 September 1943, the victorious Germans then disbanded the 21st Infantry Division "Granatieri di Sardegna" and its regiments.

For their conduct during the defence of the Rome the 1st Regiment "Granatieri di Sardegna" and the "Lancieri di Montebello" were both awarded a Silver Medal of Military Valor, while the 2nd Regiment "Granatieri di Sardegna" was awarded a Bronze Medal of Military Valor.

==== Minor units ====
During the war the depots of the two grenadier regiments in Rome formed the following autonomous units:

- IV Truck-transported Anti-tank Battalion, equipped with 47/32 anti-tank guns
- XXXII Truck-transported Anti-tank Battalion, equipped with 47/32 anti-tank guns
- 21st Anti-tank Cannons Company, equipped with 47/32 anti-tank guns
- 121st Anti-tank Cannons Company, equipped with 47/32 anti-tank guns
- 203rd, 204th, and 205th anti-aircraft companies
- II Replacements Battalion
- Special Grenadiers Grouping

The IV Truck-transported Anti-tank Battalion consisted of three anti-tank cannons companies. In December 1941, the battalion was sent to North Africa for the Western Desert campaign. On 13 January 1942, the battalion arrived in Tripolitania and was assigned to the 132nd Armored Division "Ariete". After the Axis defeat in the Second Battle of El Alamein the battalion's remnants retreated to Tunisia, where the battalion was assigned to the 66th Infantry Regiment "Trieste" of the 101st Motorized Division "Trieste" for the Tunisian campaign. The 21st Anti-tank Cannons Company also served in the Tunisian campaign. Both units were lost when Axis forces in Tunisia surrendered to the Anglo-American allies on 13 May 1943.

The XXXII Truck-transported Anti-tank Battalion consisted of three anti-tank cannons companies and was assigned, together with the 121st Anti-tank Cannons Company, to the Italian 8th Army, which in summer 1942 was sent to the Eastern Front. In the Soviet Union, the XXXII Truck-transported Anti-tank Battalion was initially assigned to the 5th Infantry Division "Cosseria" and then the 3rd Infantry Division "Ravenna", while the 121st Anti-tank Cannons Company was assigned to the 2nd Infantry Division "Sforzesca". In December 1942, the Italian 8th Army and its units were destroyed during the Soviet Operation Little Saturn and the following Ostrogozhsk–Rossosh offensive.

The three anti-aircraft companies were deployed to Sicily, where they were tasked with guarding rail installations: the 203rd in Palermo, the 204th in Syracuse, and the 205th in Agrigento. In July 1943, the three companies were destroyed during the Allied invasion of Sicily. The II Replacements Battalion remained in Ljubljana, when the 21st Infantry Division "Granatieri di Sardegna" was recalled to Rome. The battalion was disbanded by German forces after the announcement of the Armistice of Cassibile.

==== Italian Co-belligerent Army ====
In June 1942, grenadier depots in Rome formed the Grenadiers Landing Grouping, with reservists born in 1907. The grouping consisted of the I Battalion, which was formed by the depot of the 1st Regiment "Granatieri di Sardegna", and the II Battalion, which was formed by the depot of the 2nd Regiment "Granatieri di Sardegna". Both battalions had the same organization as the battalions of the Royal Italian Navy's Marine Regiment "San Marco". The grouping was sent to the island of Elba, where it trained amphibious landings and was renamed Special Grenadiers Grouping. After the Allied forces landed in French North Africa Italy and Germany occupied Vichy France. On 11 November 1942, the Special Grenadiers Grouping and the Marine Regiment "San Marco" landed in Corsica and proceed to occupy the island. In April 1943, the grouping, which was based in the South of Corsica, added the III Battalion.

After the announcement of the Armistice of Cassibile, the Special Grenadiers Grouping's, which had its headquarter in the village of Zonza, remained, in accordance with the last orders the grouping had received from Rome, neutral and allowed German forces to retreat through the grouping's positions towards Bastia in the Corsica's North. Over the next days, fighting between German forces and Corsican resistance fighters intensified. During the night of 12 to 13 September, the Italian government, which had fled to the city of Brindisi, ordered the remaining Italian forces to fight the Germans. On 13 September 1943, when troops of the German Sturmbrigade Reichführer-SS, which had its headquarter in the nearby village of Quenza, arrived at the positions of the grouping's II Battalion in Zonza, fierce fighting erupted, which lasted all day. By evening the grouping's II Battalion still controlled the important crossroads at Zonza. The next day, the grouping's I Battalion, which was based in the village of L'Ospedale, allied with Corsican resistance fighters and blocked German units from using the road arriving from Porto-Vecchio. On 15 September 1943, the grouping's II Battalion, in coordination with the Alpini Battalion "Monte Granero", attacked the German base in Quenza, which was quickly overrun. The same day, a detached company of II Battalion, which was based in the village of Levie, was attacked by armored units of the German 90th Panzergrenadier Division, which had retreated from Sardinia to Corsica. As more and more German armored units landed in Corsica, the Special Grenadiers Grouping's commander ordered his units to fall back to the village of Serra-di-Scopamène, where the grouping could link up with forces of the 44th Infantry Division "Cremona". During the night of 16 to 17 September, the grouping's units fell back to the new Italian line and the Germans then accelerated their retreat towards Bastia. On 18 September 1943, the grouping's III Battalion arrived from Ajaccio and the grouping reoccupied Quenza and Zonza. On 21 September 1943, the grouping's III Battalion sent one of its companies to occupy L'Ospedale. The next day, the III Battalion was ordered to drive the German rearguards out of Porto-Vecchio. On 23 September 1943, the III Battalion's troops clashed with German forces in Palavese, which by evening retreated and thus opened the road to liberate Porto-Vecchio.

From 10 to 13 October 1943, the Special Grenadiers Grouping, which had joined the Italian Co-belligerent Army, was shipped from Corsica to Sardinia, where it was sent to the city of Iglesias. On 15 May 1944, the grouping was disbanded and its command used to form the command of the newly formed Grenadiers Division. At the same time, the grouping's battalions were used reform the 1st Grenadiers Regiment and 2nd Grenadiers Regiment. The division also included the 32nd Tank Infantry Regiment, 132nd Tank Infantry Regiment, 553rd Artillery Regiment, and 548th Artillery Regiment.

On 7 August 1944, the 1st Grenadiers Regiment was shipped to Afragola in southern Italy, followed by the 2nd Grenadiers Regiment on 11 August. On 21 August 1944, the 1st Grenadiers Regiment was disbanded and its personnel used to form a Grenadiers Battalion, which was assigned to the 87th Infantry Regiment "Friuli" as the regiment's III Battalion. Likewise, on 31 August 1944, the 2nd Grenadiers Regiment was disbanded and its personnel used to form a Grenadiers Battalion, which was assigned to the 88th Infantry Regiment "Friuli" as the regiment's III Battalion. Both infantry regiments were assigned to the Division "Friuli", which on 20 September 1944, was reorganized as Combat Group "Friuli". Dressed in British uniforms and equipped with British weapons and materiel, the Combat Group "Friuli" entered combat on the allied side on 5 February 1945 and fought in the Italian campaign for the rest of the war.

=== Cold War ===
On 1 July 1946, the 1st Regiment "Granatieri di Sardegna" was reformed in Rome. The regiment consisted of a command, a command platoon (later increased to a command company), and three battalions. The regiment soon added a mortar company equipped with 81mm Mod. 35 mortars and an anti-tank cannons company with QF 6-pounder anti-tank guns. On 1 April 1948, the regiment was assigned to the Infantry Division "Granatieri di Sardegna". In the early 1960s the regiment's III Battalion became a reserve formation and the regiment added the IV Mechanized Battalion in Civitavecchia.

During the 1975 army reform the Italian Army disbanded the regimental level and newly independent battalions were granted for the first time their own flags. On 31 August 1975, the I Battalion of the 1st Regiment "Granatieri di Sardegna" was renamed 1st Grenadiers Battalion "Assietta", while the regiment's II Battalion was renamed 2nd Grenadiers Battalion "Cengio". The 1st Grenadiers Battalion "Assietta" was named for the Battle of Assietta, during which the Guard Regiment's I Battalion had distinguished itself. The 2nd Grenadiers Battalion "Cengio" was named for Monte Cengio, where the Brigade "Granatieri di Sardegna" had stopped the Austro-Hungarian Asiago Offensive. One year later, on 30 September 1976, the 1st Regiment "Granatieri di Sardegna" and the regiment's III and IV battalions were disbanded. The next day, on 1 October 1976, the 1st Grenadiers Battalion "Assietta" and 2nd Grenadiers Battalion "Cengio" became autonomous units and were renamed 1st Mechanized Grenadiers Battalion "Assietta", respectively 2nd Mechanized Grenadiers Battalion "Cengio". The two battalions were assigned to the Infantry Division "Granatieri di Sardegna". Both battalions consisted of a command, a command and services company, three mechanized companies with M113 armored personnel carriers, and a heavy mortar company with M106 mortar carriers with 120 mm Mod. 63 mortars. At the time each of the two battalions fielded 896 men (45 officers, 100 non-commissioned officers, and 751 grenadiers).

On 1 November 1976, the Infantry Division "Granatieri di Sardegna" was reorganized as Mechanized Brigade "Granatieri di Sardegna" and the two mechanized grenadier battalions were assigned to the brigade. The two battalions were joined by the 3rd Grenadiers Battalion "Guardie", which had been reformed on 1 January 1976 in Orvieto. On 12 November 1976, the President of the Italian Republic Giovanni Leone assigned with decree 846 the flag and traditions of the 1st Regiment "Granatieri di Sardegna" to the 1st Mechanized Grenadiers Battalion "Assietta" and the flag and traditions of the 2nd Regiment "Granatieri di Sardegna" to the 2nd Mechanized Grenadiers Battalion "Cengio".

=== Recent times ===
On 30 September 1992, the 1st Mechanized Grenadiers Battalion "Assietta" lost its autonomy and the next day, on 1 October 1992, the battalion entered the reformed 1st Regiment "Granatieri di Sardegna" as Grenadiers Battalion "Assietta". On the same day, the flag and traditions of the 1st Regiment "Granatieri di Sardegna" were transferred from the Grenadiers Battalion "Assietta" to the reformed regiment. From 26 June 1993 to 7 January 1994, one of the regiment's companies was deployed to Somalia with the United Nations Operation in Somalia II. In 1996, the 2nd Regiment "Granatieri di Sardegna" moved from Rome to Spoleto.

On 29 October 2002, the 2nd Regiment "Granatieri di Sardegna" was disbanded and the regiment's grenadier companies were transferred to the 1st Regiment "Granatieri di Sardegna", which formed a detachment in Spoleto with the companies. On 21 November 2017, the detachment in Spoleto was used to reform the 2nd Grenadiers Battalion "Cengio", which remained assigned to the 1st Regiment "Granatieri di Sardegna". On the same day the Grenadiers Battalion "Assietta" was renamed 1st Grenadiers Battalion "Assietta". On 31 August 2022, the 2nd Grenadiers Battalion "Cengio" left the 1st Regiment "Granatieri di Sardegna" and the next day, on 1 September 2022, the battalion entered the reformed 2nd Regiment "Granatieri di Sardegna".

== Organization ==
As of 2024 the 1st Regiment "Granatieri di Sardegna" is organized as follows:

- 1st Regiment "Granatieri di Sardegna", in Rome
  - Command and Logistic Support Company
  - Grenadiers Battalion "Assietta"
    - 1st Grenadiers Company
    - 2nd Grenadiers Company
    - 3rd Grenadiers Company
    - 4th Maneuver Support Company
    - Honor Guard Company

The Maneuver Support Company it equipped with 120mm mortars and Spike MR anti-tank guided missiles.

== See also ==
- Mechanized Brigade "Granatieri di Sardegna"
