= Caimi =

Caimi is a family name of Italian origin. It may refer to:

- Antonio Caimi, Italian painter
- Giuseppe Caimi, Italian soldier and football player
- Lamberto Caimi, Italian cinematographer
- Dorival Caymmi (whose great-grandfather was Enrico Balbino Caimi), Brazilian singer-songwriter
