= 3rd Regiment "Granatieri di Sardegna" =

Active Italian Army grenadier unit

- 3° Reggimento "Granatieri di Sardegna"
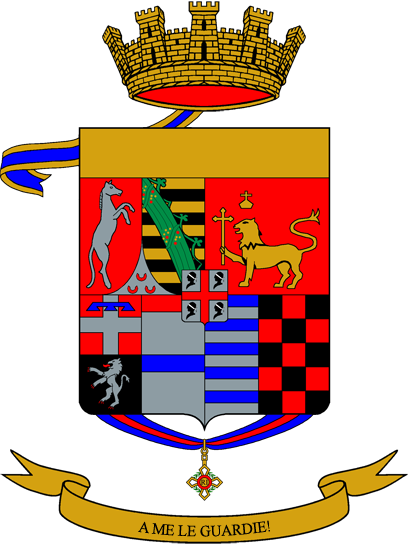
- Regimental coat of arms
- Active: 11 March 1849 — 1 June 1849; 4 Nov. 1926 — 8 Sep. 1943; 1 Jan. 1976 — 30 April 2002; 1 Oct. 2022 — today
- Country: Italy
- Branch: Italian Army
- Part of: Mechanized Brigade "Granatieri di Sardegna"
- Garrison/HQ: Rome
- Motto(s): "A me le Guardie!"
- Anniversaries: 18 April 1659 - Founding of the Granatieri speciality
- Decorations: 1× Military Order of Italy; 1× Gold Medal of Military Valor; 1× Silver Cross of Army Merit^{*} awarded to the Command and Tactical Supports Unit "Granatieri di Sardegna"

Insignia
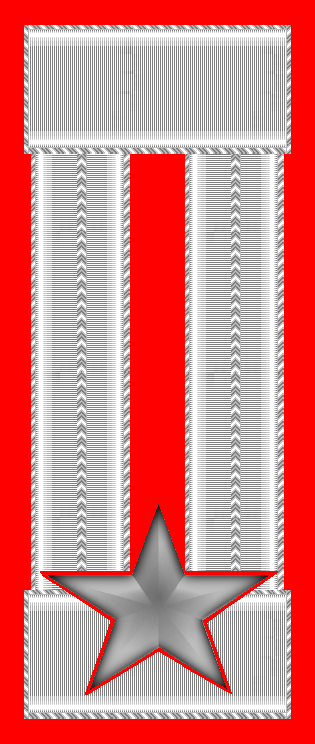
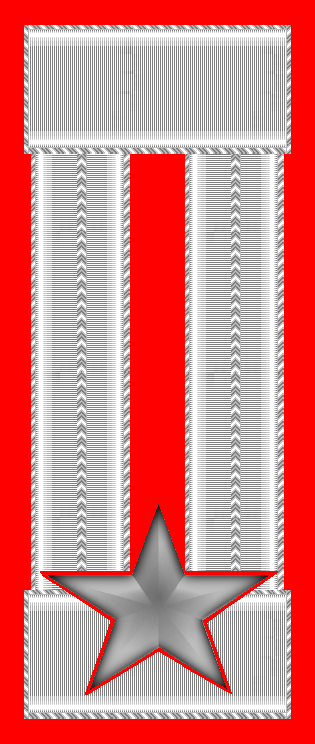
- Granatieri gorget patches

The 3rd Regiment "Granatieri di Sardegna" (Italian: 3° Reggimento "Granatieri di Sardegna") is a grenadiers unit of the Italian Army's infantry arm's grenadiers (Italian: Granatieri) speciality. In 1849, the Royal Sardinian Army formed the 3rd Grenadier Guards Regiment for the second campaign of the First Italian War of Independence. The regiment was disbanded after the war's end. In 1926, the Royal Italian Army reformed the 3rd Regiment "Granatieri di Sardegna", which was assigned to the 21st Infantry Division "Granatieri di Sardegna". In 1935-36, the regiment's I Grenadiers Battalion fought in the Second Italo-Ethiopian War. In 1939, the regiment left the 21st Infantry Division "Granatieri di Sardegna" and became an autonomous unit. The same year the regiment moved from Viterbo to Tirana in occupied Albania. In 1940, the regiment was renamed 3rd Regiment "Granatieri di Sardegna e d'Albania". Between 28 October 1940 and 23 April 1941, the regiment fought in the Greco-Italian War. For its conduct in the war the regiment was awarded Italy highest military honor the Gold Medal of Military Valor. The regiment then served on occupation duty in Athens. After the announcement of the Armistice of Cassibile on 8 September 1943 the regiment was disbanded by invading German forces.

On 1 January 1976, the II Battalion of the 80th Infantry Regiment "Roma" in Orvieto became an autonomous unit and was renamed 3rd Grenadiers Battalion "Guardie". The battalion was assigned the flag and traditions of the 3rd Regiment "Granatieri di Sardegna". On 1 November 1976, the battalion was assigned to the Mechanized Brigade "Granatieri di Sardegna". In 1992, the battalion lost its autonomy and entered the reformed 3rd Regiment "Guardie". In 2002, the regiment was disbanded and the flag of the 3rd Regiment "Granatieri di Sardegna" was transferred to the Shrine of the Flags in the Vittoriano in Rome for safekeeping. On 1 October 2022, the flag and traditions of the regiment were assigned to the Command and Tactical Supports Unit "Granatieri di Sardegna" of the Mechanized Brigade "Granatieri di Sardegna", which was renamed on the same day 3rd Granatieri Command and Tactical Supports Unit "Guardie". The regiment's anniversary falls, as for all grenadiers units, on 18 April 1659, the day the Granatieri speciality was founded.

== History ==
=== First Italian War of Independence ===
On 23 March 1848, the First Italian War of Independence between the Kingdom of Sardinia and the Austrian Empire began. At the time the Royal Sardinian Army's Guards Brigade, consisted of the 1st Grenadiers Regiment (Guards Brigade) with four grenadier battalions, and the 2nd Hunters Regiment (Guards Brigade) with three hunters battalions, one of which was based on the island of Sardinia. At the outbreak of the war the 2nd Hunters Regiment (Guards Brigade) was renamed 2nd Grenadiers Regiment (Guards Brigade) and the Guards Brigade reorganized its units. Afterwards the 1st Grenadiers Regiment (Guards Brigade) consisted of the I Grenadiers Battalion, III Grenadiers Battalion, and I Hunters Battalion; while the 2nd Grenadiers Regiment (Guards Brigade) consisted of the II Grenadiers Battalion, IV Grenadiers Battalion, and II Hunters Battalion. In this form the brigade fought in 1848 in the battles of Pastrengo, Santa Lucia, Goito, Sommacampagna, Staffalo, Custoza, and Milan. On 9 August 1848, the first campaign of the war ended with the Armistice of Salasco and the Royal Sardinian Army retreated from the Kingdom of Lombardy–Venetia.

On 14 October 1848, the Guards Brigade reformed the 1st Hunters Regiment, which received the I Hunters Battalion and II Hunters Battalion. On 6 February 1849, the 1st Grenadiers Regiment (Guards Brigade) formed the I Provisional Grenadier Guards Battalion, while the 2nd Grenadiers Regiment (Guards Brigade) formed the II Provisional Grenadier Guards Battalion. On 10 February 1849, the two provisional battalions were used to form the Provisional Grenadier Guards Regiment. On 11 March 1849, the Provisional Grenadier Guards Regiment was renamed 3rd Grenadier Guards Regiment. On 20 March 1849, the second campaign of the war began and the next day, on 21 March 1849, the Guards Brigade fought in the Mortara. Two days later, on 23 March 1849, the brigade fought in the decisive Battle of Novara. After the defeat at Novara, King Charles Albert of Sardinia abdicated in favour of his son Victor Emmanuel, who ascended the throne as Victor Emmanuel II. On 24 March, the new King met with the Austrian Field Marshal Joseph Radetzky at Vignale and agreed to an armistice, which ended the First Italian War of Independence. On 1 June 1849, the 3rd Grenadier Guards Regiment and its two battalions were disbanded.

=== Interwar years ===
In 1926, the Royal Italian Army reorganized its forces and formed infantry brigades, which consisted of three, instead of the traditional two, infantry regiments. On 31 October 1926, the Brigade "Granatieri di Sardegna" was renamed XXI Infantry Brigade, while the brigade's regiments were renamed 1st Regiment "Granatieri di Sardegna", respectively 2nd Regiment "Granatieri di Sardegna". The XXI Infantry Brigade was the infantry component of the 21st Territorial Division of Rome, which also included the 13th Field Artillery Regiment. Infantry brigades formed in 1926 consisted of three regiments and consequently, on 4 November 1926, the 3rd Regiment "Granatieri di Sardegna" was formed in Viterbo and assigned to the XXI Infantry Brigade. The new regiment's I Battalion and depot were formed with personnel ceded by the 1st Regiment "Granatieri di Sardegna", while the II Battalion and regimental command were formed with personnel ceded by the 2nd Regiment "Granatieri di Sardegna". Afterwards, each of the three regiments consisted of a command, a command company, two grenadier battalions, and a depot.

On 8 February 1934, the 21st Territorial Division of Rome was renamed Infantry Division "Granatieri di Sardegna". In 1935-36, the regiment's I Battalion deployed to East Africa for the Second Italo-Ethiopian War, where the battalion fought in the Second Battle of Tembien. The regiment also provided eleven officers and 130 troops to units deployed to East Africa for the war. For its service and conduct in Ethiopia the I Battalion was awarded, as were all other infantry units that had served in the war, a Military Order of Italy, which was affixed to the flag of the 3rd Regiment "Granatieri di Sardegna".

On 6 April 1939, a provisional regiment with elements drawn from all three grenadier regiments was formed for the Italian invasion of Albania. In the night from 7 to 8 April 1939, a battalion of the provisional regiment was airlifted to Tirana, while the rest of the regiment followed by sea a few days later. During the same year, the Royal Italian Army reorganized its divisions as binary divisions and consequently, the 3rd Regiment "Granatieri di Sardegna" left the 21st Infantry Division "Granatieri di Sardegna" and became an autonomous unit. On 25 July 1939, the 3rd Regiment "Granatieri di Sardegna" moved from Viterbo to Tirana, where it replaced the provisional regiment, which was repatriated and disbanded in Rome on 28 July 1939.

In Albania the regiment was renamed Grenadiers of Albania Regiment (3rd Regiment "Granatieri di Sardegna"), which in 1940 was changed to 3rd Regiment "Granatieri di Sardegna e d'Albania".

=== World War II ===
At the outbreak of World War II the 3rd Regiment "Granatieri di Sardegna e d'Albania" consisted of a command, a command company, three grenadier battalions, a support weapons battery equipped with 65/17 infantry support guns, and a mortar company equipped with 81mm Mod. 35 mortars. On 1 August 1940, the regiment fielded 3,091 men (118 officers, 80 non-commissioned officers, and 2,893 soldiers). In fall 1940, the regiment formed, together with the Regiment "Lancieri di Aosta" and Regiment "Lancieri di Milano", the Littoral Grouping, which, as per tradition for Italian grenadier units, was deployed on the extreme right of the Italian front for the planned Italian invasion of Greece.

On 28 October 1940, Italy invaded Greece and the Littoral Grouping quickly reached the Kalamas river in Greece. In November 1940, the Littoral Grouping fought in the Battle of Elaia–Kalamas against Greek forces. In 1941, the 3rd Regiment "Granatieri di Sardegna e d'Albania" fought on Mount Mali i Golikut, in the Kurvelesh region and on the slopes of Mount Scindeli. After the German invasion of Greece and the Greek surrender, the regiment was assigned to the 11th Army and moved to Athens as occupation force. For its conduct during the Greco-Italian War the 3rd Regiment "Granatieri di Sardegna e d'Albania" was awarded a Gold Medal of Military Valor, which was affixed to thee regiment's flag.

While the 3rd Regiment "Granatieri di Sardegna e d'Albania" was on occupation duty in Athens, the regiment's depot in Tirana formed the XXXII Anti-tank Battalion, which was consisted of three companies equipped with 47/32 mod. 35 anti-tank guns. The XXXII Anti-tank Battalion was assigned to the II Army Corps, which in summer 1942 deployed to the Eastern Front. In December 1942, the II Army Corps, and with it the XXXII Anti-tank Battalion, were destroyed during the Red Army's Operation Little Saturn.

In the evening of 8 September 1943, the Armistice of Cassibile, which ended hostilities between the Kingdom of Italy and the Anglo-American Allies, was announced by General Dwight D. Eisenhower on Radio Algiers and by Marshal Pietro Badoglio on Italian radio. Germany reacted by invading Italy and by disarming the Italian occupation forces outside of Italy. Shortly after the announcement of the armistice the 3rd Regiment "Granatieri di Sardegna e d'Albania" was disbanded by German forces.

=== Cold War ===
During the 1975 army reform the Italian Army disbanded the regimental level and newly independent battalions were granted for the first time their own flags. On 31 December 1975, the 80th Infantry Regiment "Roma" was disbanded and the next day the regiment's II Battalion in Orvieto became an autonomous unit and was renamed 3rd Grenadiers Battalion "Guardie". The battalion was assigned to the Central Military Region and consisted of a command, a command platoon, and three recruits training companies. On 1 November 1976, the Infantry Division "Granatieri di Sardegna" was reorganized as Mechanized Brigade "Granatieri di Sardegna" and the 3rd Grenadiers Battalion "Guardie" was transferred from the Central Military Region to the brigade, as the brigade's recruits training battalion. On 12 November 1976, the President of the Italian Republic Giovanni Leone assigned with decree 846 the flag and traditions of the 3rd Regiment "Granatieri di Sardegna" to the battalion.

=== Recent times ===
On 20 October 1992, the 3rd Grenadiers Battalion "Guardie" lost its autonomy and the next day the battalion entered the reformed 3rd Regiment "Guardie" as I Grenadiers Battalion. On the same day, the flag and traditions of the 3rd Regiment "Granatieri di Sardegna" were transferred from the battalion to the 3rd Regiment "Guardie". On 30 April 2002, the 3rd Regiment "Guardie" was disbanded and the flag of the 3rd Regiment "Granatieri di Sardegna" was transferred to the Shrine of the Flags in the Vittoriano in Rome for safekeeping.

== Command and Tactical Supports Unit "Granatieri di Sardegna" ==
On 1 December 1948, the Italian Army formed the Connections Battalion "Granatieri di Sardegna" in Rome, which was assigned to the Infantry Division "Granatieri di Sardegna". The battalion consisted of a command, a command platoon, and three connections companies — one for the division's headquarters, one for the division's infantry regiments, and one for the division's artillery regiments. On 1 October 1952, the Connections Speciality became an autonomous speciality of the Engineer Arm, with its own school and gorget patches. On 16 May 1953, the speciality adopted the name Signal Speciality and consequently, on 1 June 1953, the Connections Battalion "Granatieri di Sardegna" was renamed Signal Battalion "Granatieri di Sardegna". In March 1954, the battalion was reduced to a company consisting of a command, a command platoon, two Marconisti platoons, a signals center platoon, and a phone signals platoon. On 1 April 1959, the company was expanded to battalion and now consisted of a command, a command platoon, the 1st Signal Company, and the 2nd Signal Company.

During the 1975 army reform the Infantry Division "Granatieri di Sardegna" was disbanded and with its units the Mechanized Brigade "Granatieri di Sardegna" and Motorized Brigade "Acqui" formed. Consequently, on 30 September 1975, the Signal Battalion "Granatieri di Sardegna" was disbanded and its personnel used to form the Signal Company "Granatieri di Sardegna". On 30 October 1976, the company was disbanded and its personnel formed two signal platoons, which were assigned to the Command and Signal Unit "Granatieri di Sardegna". On 1 November 1977, the two signal platoons entered the reformed Signal Company "Granatieri di Sardegna".

On 4 October 1993, the Engineer Company "Granatieri di Sardegna" entered the Command and Signal Unit "Granatieri di Sardegna", which on the same day was renamed Command and Tactical Supports Unit "Granatieri di Sardegna".

On 1 October 2022, the name, flag and traditions of the 3rd Regiment "Granatieri di Sardegna" were assigned to the Command and Tactical Supports Unit "Granatieri di Sardegna" of the Mechanized Brigade "Granatieri di Sardegna". On the same day, the unit was renamed 3rd Granatieri Command and Tactical Supports Unit "Guardie".

== Organization ==
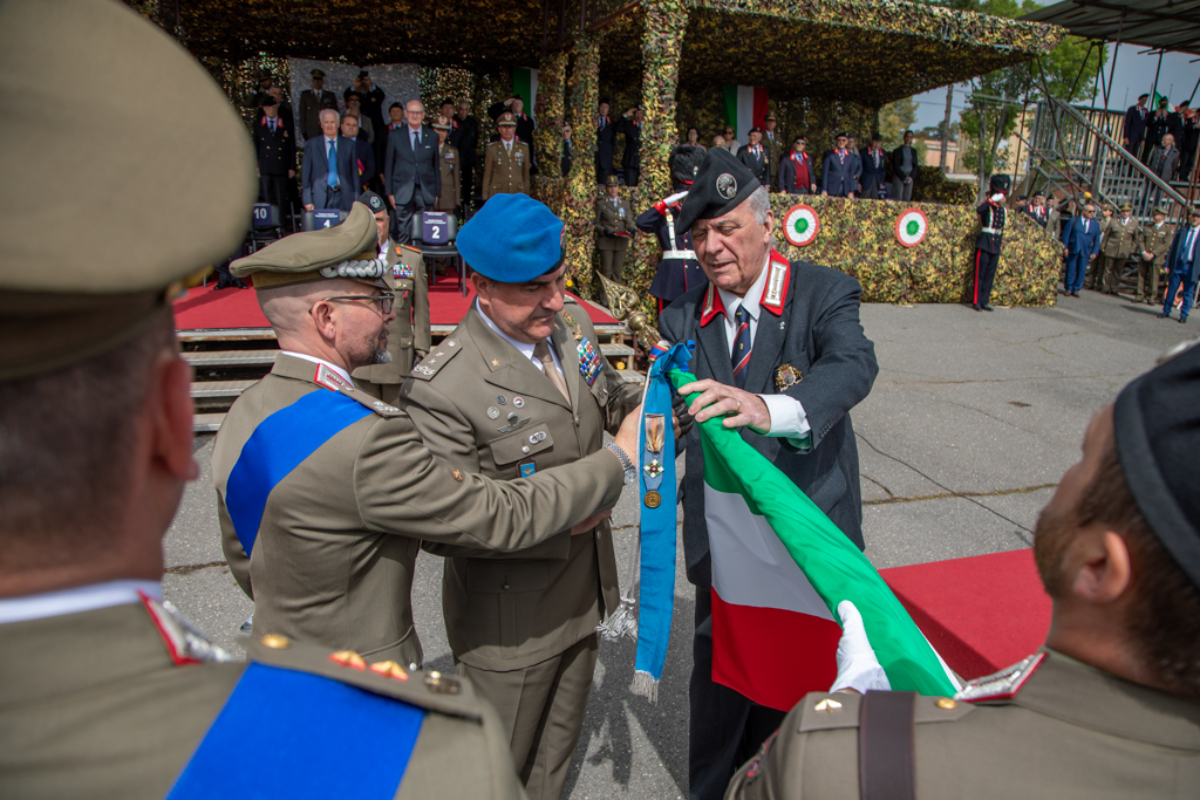
The Silver Cross of Army Merit awarded to the Command and Tactical Supports Unit "Granatieri di Sardegna" is affixed to the flag of the 3rd Regiment "Granatieri di Sardegna"

As of 2024 the 3rd Granatieri Command and Tactical Supports Unit "Guardie" is organized as follows:

- 3rd Granatieri Command and Tactical Supports Unit "Guardie", in Rome
  - Command and Logistic Support Company
  - Signal Company

== See also ==
- Mechanized Brigade "Granatieri di Sardegna"
