= DeWitt Coleman =

American World War I pilot (1892–1918)

DeWitt T. Coleman Jr.
- Born: October 29, 1892; New York City, U.S.
- Died: October 27, 1918 (aged 25); Vittorio Veneto, Italy
- Cause of death: Killed in action
- Burial place: Brookside Cemetery, Englewood, New Jersey
- Military career
- Allegiance: United States of America
- Branch: United States Army Air Service
- Service years: 1917-1918
- Rank: Flight lieutenant
- Nickname: Coleman DeWitt
- Unit: (Italian) 6th Squadron
- Conflicts: World War I; Battle of Vittorio Veneto †
- Awards: Gold Medal of Military Valor

DeWitt T. Coleman Jr. (October 29, 1892 - October 27, 1918) was an American real estate agent and pilot during World War I who was struck down by Austrian forces during the Battle of Vittorio Veneto and was posthumously awarded Italy's Gold Medal of Military Valor and was the only foreign aviator to have been decorated with the award following his actions during the First World War, and among the very few foreigners to receive the second highest Italian military honor.

== Biography ==
DeWitt T. Coleman Jr. was born in New York City in 1892 to DeWitt T. Coleman Sr. (1864–1939) and Leona M. Tupper (1871–1929). Coleman Sr. was born in Brooklyn and Leona was from New York State. In 1900, the Coleman's moved to Tenafly, New Jersey and DeWitt graduated from Englewood Highschool and was employed as a real estate agent in Palisades Township and Tenafly.

In 1917, DeWitt was volunteered to fight in the United States Army during World War I. DeWitt joined the United States Army Air Service section of the engineers. After the training course, he was sent first to England, then to France and finally to Italy to the training camp in Foggia. In Puglia he obtained his military pilot's licence, quickly becoming an instructor and chief pilot. He was then appointed lieutenant and in April, 1918 he was sent to the Veneto on the Italian front where, at the helm of a Caproni Ca.44 of the 6th Squadron, he took part in numerous aerial bombing actions.

During the Battle of Vittorio Veneto, on 27 October 1918, he was attacked by five Austrian fighters. Instead of landing, he decided to fight against the enemy aircraft. He managed to shoot down two of them, but was then hit and crashed with his own aircraft in flames. His remains were sent back to New Jersey on July 1, 1921, and for his service, he was posthumously awarded Italy's second highest military award, the Gold Medal of Military Valor shortly after his death in October 1918.
