= Antonio Cicirello =

Italian officer (1911–1936)

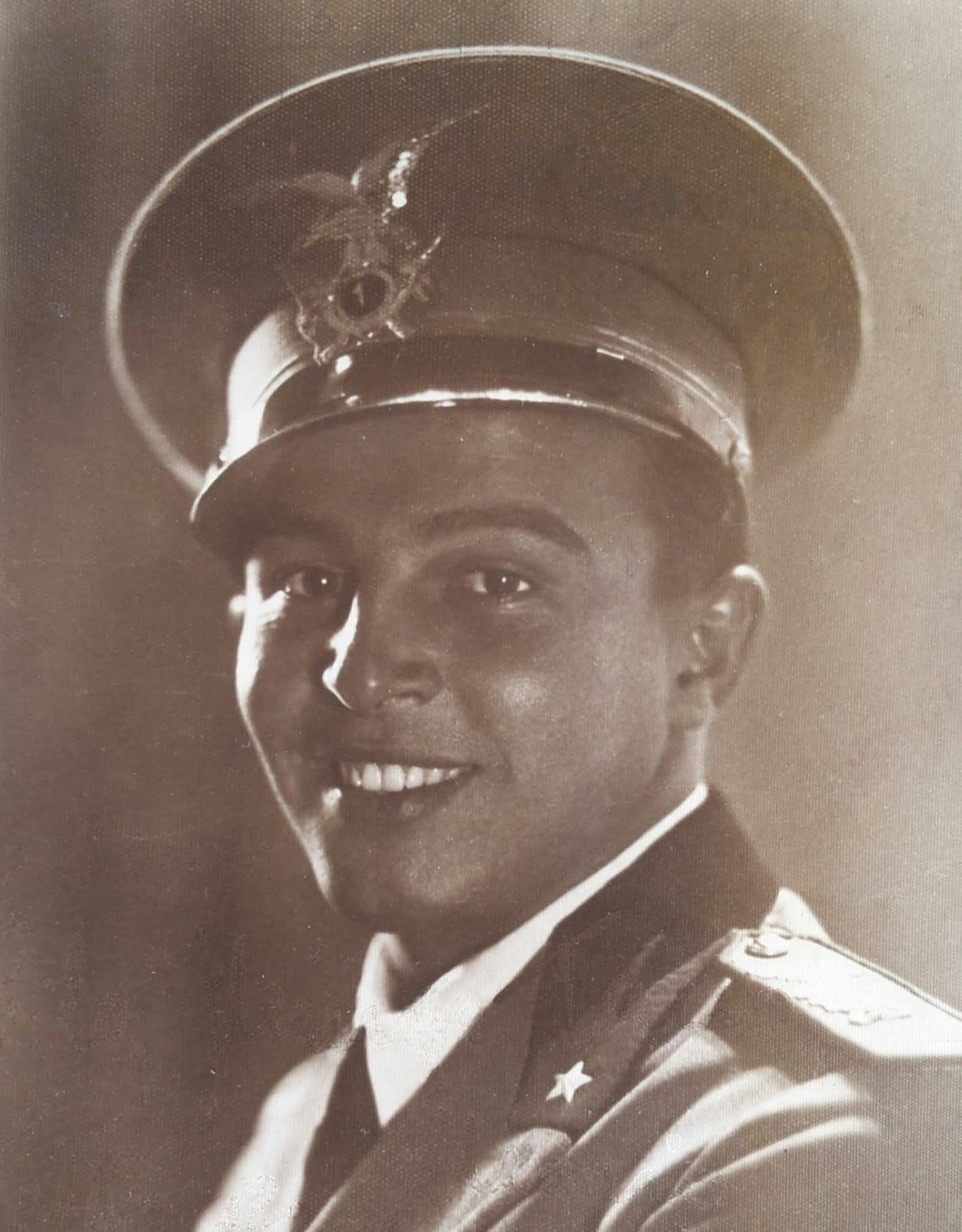
- Born: October 4, 1911; Callao, Peru
- Died: February 27, 1936 (aged 24); Tembien, Ethiopian Empire
- Military career
- Allegiance: Italy
- Branch: Royal Italian Army
- Service years: 1934–1936
- Rank: Second lieutenant
- Conflicts: Second Italo-Ethiopian War †
- Awards: Gold Medal of Military Valor

Antonio Cicirello (4 October 1911 – 27 February 1936) was an Italian Peruvian who served in the Royal Italian Army. He was decorated with the Gold Medal of Military Valour after being killed in action during the Second Italo-Ethiopian War.

== Biography ==
Born in Callao, Peru, to Italian immigrants Francesco and Adelina Cicirello, he returned to Italy to pursue a military career. He attended the School for Reserve Officer Cadets in Milan, specializing in Alpine troops, and graduated in June 1934 with the rank of second lieutenant in the infantry corps. He was assigned to the 1st Alpini Regiment of the Alpini.

After being discharged in January 1935, Cicirello was recalled to service in April of the same year due to the mobilization connected with the conflict in East Africa. He was assigned to the Alpini battalion "Pieve di Teco" of the 7th Alpini Regiment and deployed to Eritrea, arriving at Massawa on 17 January 1936. During the Second Battle of Tembien, he distinguished himself by moving to the most dangerous points of the fighting on Uork Amba, and encouraging his men under intense combat. While personally operating a machine gun against a determined enemy assault, he was killed in action on 27 February 1936. For his conduct he was posthumously awarded the Gold Medal of Military Valor.
