= Giorgio Marincola =

Somali anti-fascist partisan

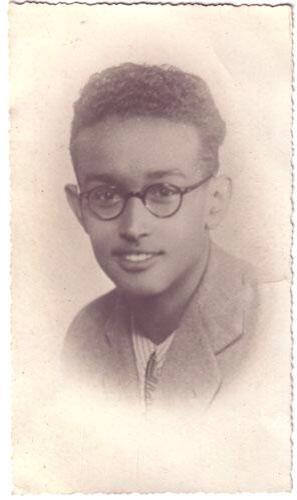
- Born: 23 September 1923; Mahaday, Italian Somalia
- Died: 4 May 1945 (aged 21); Stramentizzo, Castello-Molina di Fiemme, Italy
- Organization: Giustizia e Libertà
- Known for: Partisan
- Parents: Giuseppe Marincola (father); Aschirò Hassan (mother)
- Relatives: Isabella Marincola (sister); Rita Marincola (half-sister); Ivan Marincola (half-brother)
- Awards: Gold Medal of Military Valour

Giorgio Marincola (23 September 1923 – 4 May 1945) was a Somali-Italian partisan who was killed in the last days of the Second World War. He is believed to be the only Somali to have earned the Gold Medal of Military Valour, Italy's second highest military award for gallantry.

== Biography ==
Born in Somalia to an Italian father, Giuseppe Marincola (1891–1956), and a Somali mother, Aschirò Hassan (1901–?), he was brought to Italy with his sister, Isabella Marincola (1926–2010) in 1926 and initially sent to Calabria to live with his paternal uncle and aunt. In 1933, he came to Rome to live with his father and sister and began middle school. During Marincola's stay in the South, his father had married and he had two new siblings, Rita (born 1928) and Ivan (born 1929).

== Legacy ==
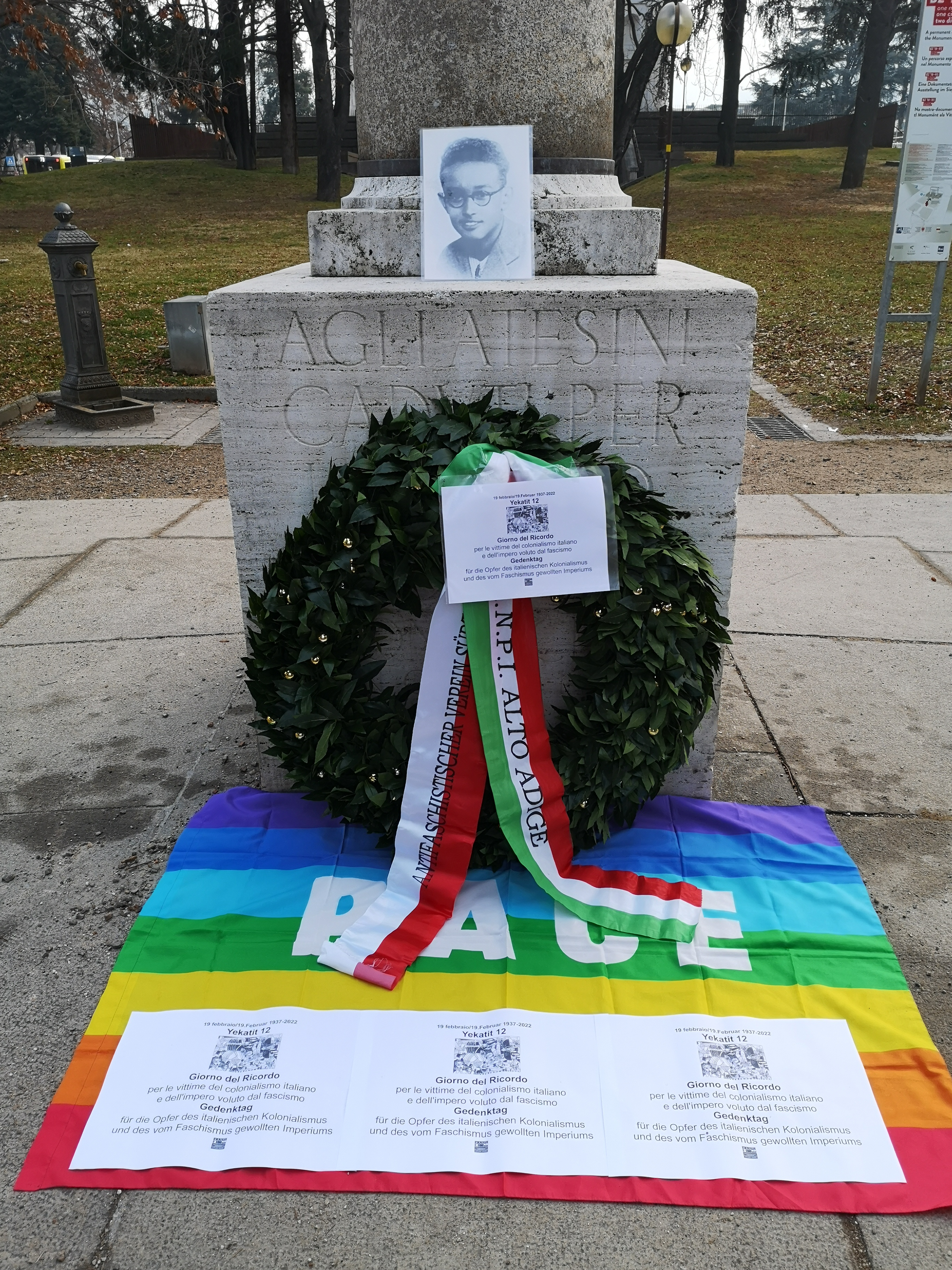
Monument to Marincola with ANPI's commemoration in Bolzano, 2022

On 2 October 1952, signed by decree of the Prime Minister Alcide De Gasperi, Giorgio Marincola was posthumously awarded the Gold Medal of Military Valour. The citation for the award reads:

Teenage university student, immediately after the armistice he joined the liberation struggle, greatly distinguishing himself in the Roman underground units through determination, talent and bravery. After the liberation of the capital, eager to continue the struggle, he joined a military mission and in August 1944 he was parachuted into Biella. He rendered valuable services in the organizational and information fields and in numerous armed skirmishes he demonstrated firm conviction and legendary courage, causing injuries. Captured by the enemy and forced to broadcast propaganda on the radio, despite the expectation of extreme reprisals, with inner strength he took the opportunity to proclaim loyalty to the legitimate government. After harsh imprisonment, freed by an Allied mission, he refused to go to safety to Switzerland and preferred to continue to fight with the Trentino partisans. He fell bravely in a skirmish with the German SS when the struggle for liberation was just triumphantly concluded.
— Castel di Fiemme (Trento), 4 May 1945

In the summer of 2020, in the wake of the protests triggered by the Black Lives Matter movement, Mayor Virginia Raggi proposed a record in the Capitoline Assembly, which was approved, to name an under construction station of the Rome Metro (later renamed) after Marincola.
