= Mohammed Ibrahim Farag =

Ibrahim Farag Mohammed
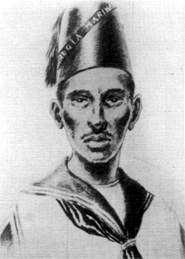
- Born: 1908; Massaua, Italian Eritrea (now Massaua, State of Eritrea)
- Died: April 4, 1941 (aged 32–33); Red Sea, off the coast of Sudan
- Military career
- Allegiance: Kingdom of Italy
- Branch: Regia Marina
- Service years: 1925–1941
- Rank: Boluk-bashi
- Unit: Naval Askari
- Conflicts: Italian Somali Wars, World War 2
- Awards

Mohammed Ibrahim Farag (Massawa, 1908 – Red Sea, April 4, 1941) was an Eritrean serviceman of the Italian Royal Navy. He was one of two Eritrean servicemen decorated with the Gold Medal of Military Valor. He also received the War Cross of Military Valor.
