= Andrea Adorno =

Italian Army officer

Andre Adorno
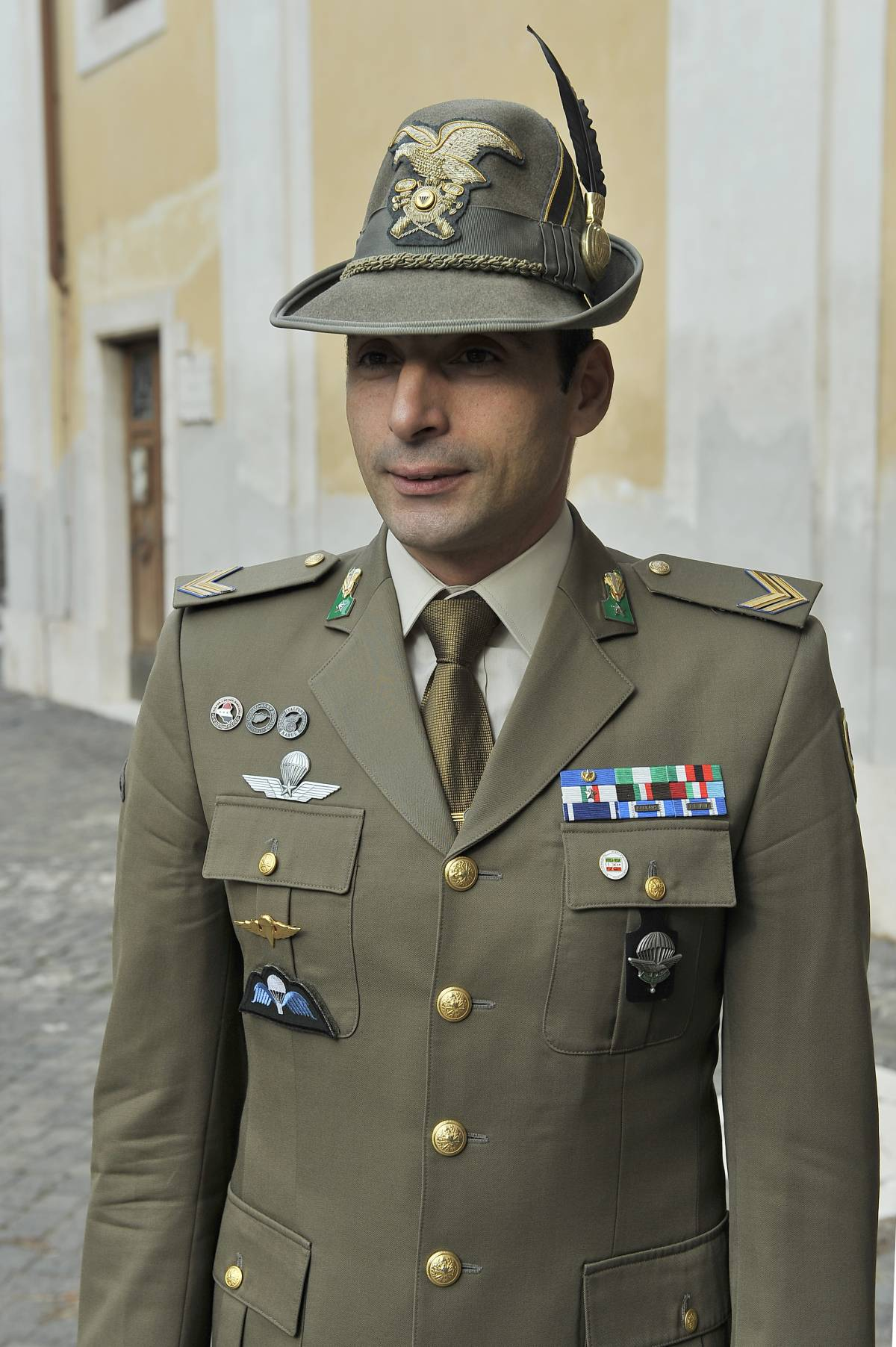
- Born: 1980 (age 45–46); Catania
- Military career
- Allegiance: Italy
- Branch: Alpini
- Rank: Sergeant Major
- Awards: Gold Medal of Military Valour

Andrea Adorno (1980, Catania) is an Italian Army soldier, recipient of the Gold Medal for Military Valor. He is the first Italian officer to receive the medal while still serving in the military.

== Career ==
Adorno served in the 4th Alpini Paratroopers Regiment, where he was deployed in the Balkans, Afghanistan and Iraq. From 2011 to 2018 he served in the 62nd Infantry Regiment "Sicilia".

On 16 July 2010, he was awarded the Gold Medal of Military Valour for his service in Afghanistan.

"Alpine paratrooper, during the operation «Maashin IV», aimed at disrupting the Afghan insurgency, after conquering the objective, he was invested with his unit by overwhelming enemy fire. With uncommon courage and absolute contempt for danger, he reached a tactical foothold from which he reacted with his own weapon to the adversary's action. Upon realizing that the enemy was about to fire on the soldiers of another squad of his platoon, he did not hesitate to interpose himself between them and the threat, interdicting the action. Seriously wounded in a leg, he stoically maintained his position guaranteeing the security necessary for the reorganization of his unit. Fulgid example of elective military virtues."
