= Siege of Pizzighettone =

1733 siege

- Part of the War of the Polish Succession
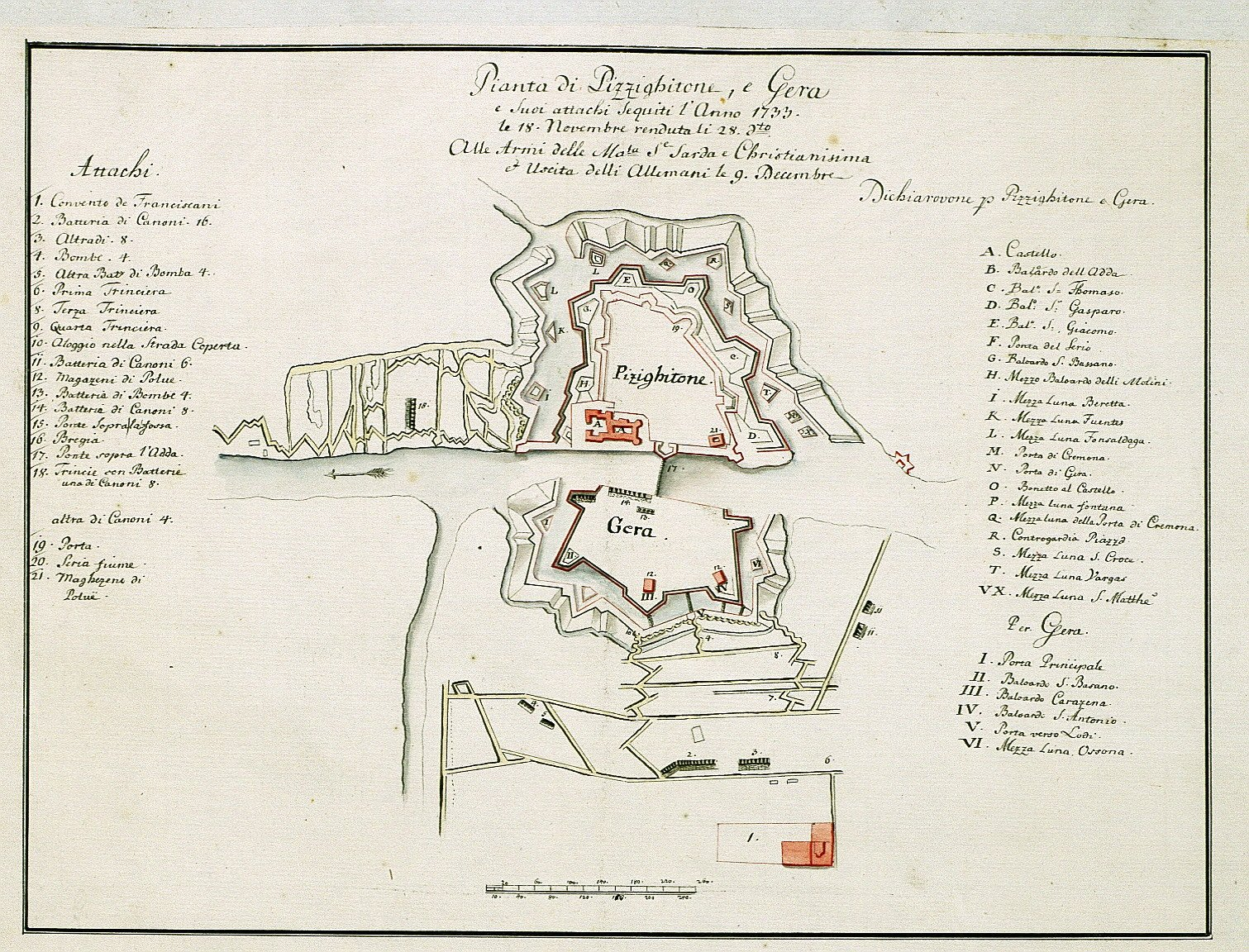
- An Italian military map depicting Pizzighettone and Gera, 1733
Date	11 November – 9 December 1733
Location	near Pizzighettone, then in the Duchy of Milan, present-day Italy
Result	Franco-Sardinian victory

Belligerents
Kingdom of France; Kingdom of Sardinia	Austria

Commanders and leaders
Duke of Villars	Graf Livingstein

Strength
15,000 infantry 4,000 cavalry	3,700 men

The siege of Pizzighettone was the first major military engagement of the northern Italian campaigns of the War of the Polish Succession.

Troops from France and the Kingdom of Sardinia began blockading the Habsburg Milanese fortress at Pizzighettone on 11 November 1733, commencing siege operations on 15 November. On 30 November the commander of the Austrian garrison negotiated a capitulation in which he promised to withdraw toward Mantua on 9 December if no relief arrived. As no reinforcements appeared by that time, the fortress' garrison withdrew with full honors on 9 December.
