= Giuseppe Caimi =

Italian footballer and soldier

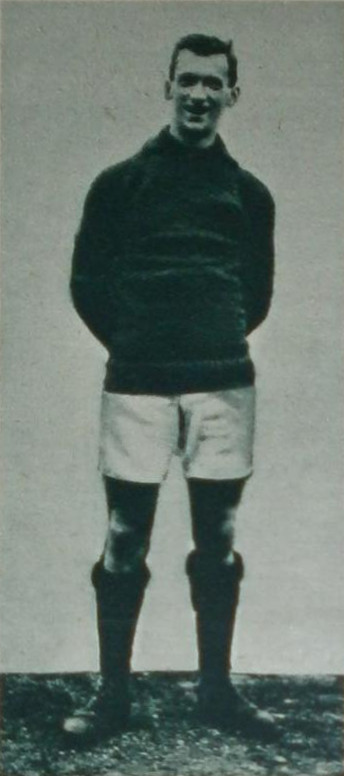
- Giuseppe Caimi ca. 1910.

Personal information
- Date of birth: 19 December 1890
- Place of birth: Milan, Kingdom of Italy
- Date of death: 26 December 1917 (aged 27)
- Place of death: Ravenna, Kingdom of Italy
- Position: Midfielder

Senior career*
Years	Team	Apps	(Gls)
1911–1913	Inter Milan	23	(2)
Total		23	(2)
- * Club domestic league appearances and goals

Giuseppe Caimi (19 December 1890 – 26 December 1917) was an Italian footballer and a soldier in the Royal Italian Army. Caimi spent two seasons with Inter Milan, making 23 league appearances, before he was drafted into the army at the outbreak of the First World War.

== Playing career ==
=== Inter Milan ===
Caimi began his professional football career with Inter Milan in 1911 and made 16 appearances in the league in his debut season, helping Inter to fourth place. He played less frequently in his second season, making 7 appearances, and scoring once, as Inter finished third in the league.

=== International ===
Caimi was selected for the Italian Olympics squad in 1912. Although he was named on the bench in each of Italy's three games, he did not play in any of them.

== Military service ==
Alpini Lieutenant Giuseppe Caimi

Upon the outbreak of the First World War, Caimi was drafted into the Royal Italian Army, fighting as part of the 7th Alpini Regiment. During his time in the army, he earned two Medaglia d'Argento al Valore Militare. He was seriously wounded in a battle on Monte Valderoa on 14 December 1917, and died of his wounds on 26 December. As a result of his actions in that battle, he was posthumously awarded the Medaglia d'Oro on 23 October 1921.
