= Gold Medal of Military Valor =

Italian medal

Gold Medal of Military Valor Medaglia d'oro al valor militare
- Gold Medal of Military Valor (Royal version & Republican version)
- Type: Military decoration
- Awarded for: Deeds of outstanding gallantry in war
- Country: Italy
- Eligibility: Junior officers and soldiers
- Established: 21 May 1793
- Ribbon bar of the medal

Precedence
- Next (higher): Military Order of Italy
- Next (lower): Gold Medal for Army Valor

The Gold Medal of Military Valor (Italian: Medaglia d'oro al valor militare, MOVM) is an Italian medal established on 21 May 1793 by King Victor Amadeus III of Sardinia for deeds of outstanding gallantry in war by junior officers and soldiers.

The face of the medal displayed the profile of the king, and on its reverse was a flag decoration and the words "al valore" ("for valor").

On 14 August 1815, Victor Emmanuel I of Sardinia replaced it with the Military Order of Savoy, now known as the Military Order of Italy.

Charles Albert of Sardinia revived it on 26 March 1833, and added to it the Silver and bronze medals. These had, on their faces, the coat of arms of Savoy with laurel branches, the royal crown, and the words "for military Valor". On the reverse were two laurel branches enclosing the name of the decorated soldier, and the place and date of the action.

With the proclamation of the Republic on 2 June 1946, the coat of arms of the House of Savoy was replaced with the emblem of the Italian Republic.

For actions performed by individuals during World War I, the Gold Medal was awarded some 368 times, as well as 37 times to military units, and once to the Unknown Soldier. Only four of the individual awards went to foreigners, one of these being Tsar Nicholas II of Russia. The other three were for acts of gallantry in which the recipient was killed in action or died from his injuries (the Frenchmen John O'Byrne and Roland Morillot, and the American Coleman deWitt). The Gold Medal of Military Valor was one of the most parsimoniously awarded medals of World War I, granted less frequently than even the Victoria Cross which was awarded 628 times.

During World War II the medal was awarded to soldiers of the Royal Italian Army; after these forces were reorganized following the Armistice with Italy in 1943, it was awarded to members of the Allies-supporting Italian Co-Belligerent forces. The Axis-affiliated Italian Social Republic created another design of the medal, with a Gladius replacing the arms of Savoy, for members of the Esercito Nazionale Repubblicano from 1943 to 1945. This version of the award was not given recognition by the postwar Italian government.

The Gold Medal for Military Valor is still awarded by the Italian state, and it, along with Silver and bronze medals for Military Valor as well as the War Cross of Military Valor (which can only be awarded in time of war) was established by the Royal Decree of 4 November 1932, in which the purpose of these medals is defined as, "to distinguish and publicly honour the authors of heroic military acts, even ones performed in time of peace, provided that the exploit is closely connected with the purposes for which the Armed Forces are constituted, whatever may be the condition or quality of the author."

== Notable recipients ==
The first recipient was Domenico Millelire of the Royal Sardinian Navy on 6 April 1793 and the latest recipient was in 2014 Chief Corporal-Major Andrea Adorno of the 4th Alpini Paratroopers Regiment for combat operations in Bala Murghab, Afghanistan in 2010.

=== Individuals ===
- Giorgio Marincola
- Andrea Adorno
- Cesare Airaghi
- Abele Ambrosini
- Francesco Azzi
- Irma Bandiera
- Francesco Baracca
- Cesare Battisti
- Giuseppe Baudoin
- Emanuele Beraudo di Pralormo
- Annibale Bergonzoli
- Edoardo Bianchini
- Carmelo Borg Pisani
- Junio Valerio Borghese
- Carlo Emanuele Buscaglia
- Giuseppe Caimi
- Nicola Calipari
- Inigo Campioni
- Carla Capponi
- Sebastiano Castagna
- Salvo D'Acquisto
- Francesco De Rosa
- Furio Niclot Doglio
- Luigi Durand de la Penne
- Emilio Faà di Bruno
- Carlo Fecia di Cossato
- Fabio Filzi
- Giovanni Fornasini
- Giuseppe Galliano (twice awarded)
- Joaquín García Morato
- Maurizio Giglio
- Luigi Giorgi (twice awarded)
- Luigi Gorrini
- Giuliano Gozi
- Amedeo Guillet
- Filippo Illuminato
- Trentino La Barba
- Antonio Locatelli (thrice awarded)
- Orlando Lorenzini
- Franco Martelli
- Giulio Martinat
- Luigi Mascherpa
- Umberto Masotto
- Corrado Mazzoni
- Domenico Millelire
- Tito Minniti
- Ettore Muti
- Federico Tommaso Paolini
- Luigi Arbib Pascucci
- Pietro Pedranzini
- Sandro Pertini
- Luigi Reverberi
- Luigi Rizzo (twice awarded)
- Giovanni Romero
- Fulco Ruffo di Calabria
- Teseo Tesei
- Virginia Tonelli
- Enrico Toti
- Leandro Verì
- Luigi Viviani

==== Foreigners decorated ====
- Charles Yorke, 4th Earl of Hardwicke (Great Britain, 1849)
- Wilhelm I (Prussia, 1866)
- John Joseph Gabriel O'Byrne (France, 1914)
- Roland Morillot (France, 1915)
- Nicholas II (Russia 1916)
- DeWitt Coleman (USA, 1918)
- Antonio Cicirello (Peru, 1936)
- John von Thun und Hohenstein (Austria, 1938)
- Joaquín García Morato (Spain, 1939)
- Frrok Gjonmarkaj Dodë (Albania, 1940)
- Unatù Endisciau (Ethiopia, 1941)
- Ibrahim Farag Mohammed (Eritrea, 1941)
- Hans-Joachim Marseille (Germany, 1942)
- Joachim Müncheberg (Germany, 1943)
- Pore Mosulishvili (Soviet Union, 1944)
- Daniil Varfolomeevič Avdeev (Soviet Union, 1944)
- Fyodor Andrianovič Poletaev (Soviet Union, 1944)
- Olivier Guinet (France, 1945)

=== Military units ===
The first military unit awarded a Gold Medal was the Regiment "Dragoni di Sua Maestà" on 21 April 1796 for the unit's conduct during the Battle of Mondovì. Although at the time the Medal was exclusively awarded for personal bravery, King Victor Amadeus III of Sardinia ordered the regiment's standard to be decorated with two medals for saving his army from Napoleon's attack. Until 1859, when the rules for awarding the Gold Medal were expanded to include cities and military units, only the Brigade "Cuneo" was awarded a Special Gold Medal of Military Valor by King Charles Felix of Sardinia for suppressing the Revolt of 1821. The first unit to be awarded the Gold Medal after 1859 was the French Imperial 3rd Zouaves Regiment for its conduct in the Battle of Palestro. The latest unit awarded the Gold Medal was the Jewish Brigade in 2017 for the brigade's service during the Italian Campaign of World War II.

The following list contains only the military units, which were awarded the Gold Medal of Military Valor twice. In total 112 gold medals were awarded to units of the Italian army: 105 to regiments and 7 to battalions.

- Regiment "Dragoni di Sua Maestà" (1796 Battle of Mondovì, the only cavalry unit to be awarded twice)
- 1st Regiment "Granatieri di Sardegna" (1860 Siege of Gaeta, 1917 Tenth Battle of the Isonzo)
- 5th Infantry Regiment "Aosta" (1859 Battle of San Martino, 1917-18 Italian Front)
- 6th Infantry Regiment "Aosta" (1859 Battle of San Martino, 1917-18 Italian Front)
- 9th Infantry Regiment "Regina" (1859 Battle of Palestro, 1915-16 Italian Front)
- 10th Infantry Regiment "Regina" (1860 Battle of Castelfidardo, 1915-16 Italian Front)
- 13th Infantry Regiment "Pinerolo" (1915-18 Italian Front, 1941 Greco-Italian War)
- 47th Infantry Regiment "Ferrara" (1915-17 Italian Front, 1940-41 Greco-Italian War)
- 48th Infantry Regiment "Ferrara" (1915-17 Italian Front, 1940-41 Greco-Italian War)
- 80th Infantry Regiment "Roma" (1941–42, 1942-43 Eastern Front)
- 84th Infantry Regiment "Venezia" (1911 Italo-Turkish War, 1943 Resistance to German forces in Yugoslavia)
- 151st Infantry Regiment "Sassari" (1915–16, 1918 Italian Front)
- 152nd Infantry Regiment "Sassari" (1915–16, 1918 Italian Front)
- 3rd Bersaglieri Regiment (1941–42, 1942 Eastern Front; the unit is also the custodian of the medal awarded to the III Bersaglieri Cyclists Battalion in 1915–18 on the Italian Front)
- 6th Bersaglieri Regiment (1942, 1942-43 Eastern Front)
- 8th Bersaglieri Regiment (1941-42 Western Desert Campaign, 1943 Tunisian Campaign)
- 5th Alpini Regiment (1940-41 Greco-Italian War, 1942-43 Eastern Front)
- 8th Alpini Regiment (1940-41 Greco-Italian War, 1942-43 Eastern Front)
- 9th Alpini Regiment (1940-41 Greco-Italian War, 1942-43 Eastern Front)
- 3rd Alpine Artillery Regiment (1940-41 Greco-Italian War, 1942-43 Eastern Front, the only artillery unit to be awarded twice)

The 4th Alpini Regiment currently also displays two Gold Medals of Military Valor on its flag, however the two medals were awarded to the regiment's Alpini Battalion "Aosta", and the Alpine Skiers Battalion "Monte Cervino".

=== Locations ===
The first geographic entity to be awarded a Gold Medal of Military Valor was the city of Vicenza in 1866 for its five days long resistance to Austrian assaults during the First Italian War of Independence. Vicenza is also the only city to be awarded the medal twice: the second time for its participation in the Italian resistance movement during World War II.

The latest city to be awarded was Varzi for the creation and defence of the Partisan Republic of Alto Tortonese between September and December 1944.

Examples:

- Region of Friuli-Venezia Giulia
- Province of Alessandria
- Province of Asti
- Province of Pordenone
- Ascoli Piceno
- Bassano del Grappa
- Lanciano
- Marzabotto
- Milan
- Modena
- Naples for the Four days of Naples in 1943
- Parma
- Varzi
- Vicenza

A full list of regions, provinces and cities, which were awarded for their bravery can be found at it:Città decorate al valor militare per la guerra di liberazione.

=== University of Padua ===
The University of Padua is the only educational institution which was awarded a Gold Medal of Military Valor. The university received it on 2 November 1945 for its furious resistance to German occupation in 1943–1945.

== See also ==
- Medal of Military Valor
- Silver Medal of Military Valor
- Bronze Medal of Military Valor
- List of military decorations
