= Luigi Arbib Pascucci =

Italian tank commander

Second Lieutenant Luigi Arbib Pascucci was an Italian tank commander during World War II. He fought with the Ariete Tank Division in North Africa. Not much is known about his early life, but his most famous actions took place in the Desert War of North Africa. Luigi fought in the Second Battle of El Alamein, where he sacrificed his life to save his comrades in an abrupt tank battle.

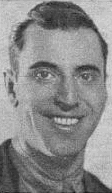

== World War II ==
On 4 November 1942 the armoured company that Pascucci was leading took part in the fighting against the British 22nd Armoured Brigade near Bir El Abd, just west of El Alamein. The next day his company was ordered to hold the left flank of the regiment against the British 8th Armoured Brigade during the Ariete Division's retreat to Fuka. Pascucci was outnumbered by the British, and many of his company's tanks were deemed obsolete against the British armour. Nevertheless, he succeeded in holding the flank long enough to allow the rest of the division to retreat safely. However, Pascucci's success in allowing the rest of the division to retreat safely was paradoxical for the young Second Lieutenant. Pascucci's company was inevitably cut off from the main body of the Italian force. He still needed time to regroup; Pascucci decided that a last-ditch counter-attack would improve the situation. He ignored enemy fire and led the remaining eleven M13/40 tanks of his company into an offensive attack directly at the centre of the British armoured Brigade. The counter-attack broke the British line and sent the 8th Armoured tanks into disarray. Pascucci then continued to pursue the fleeing British tanks. Pascucci was killed by the British during a running tank battle. He was found dead in his knocked-out tank after the battle. In recognition of his sacrifice, he was posthumously awarded the Medaglia d'oro al valor militare (Gold Medal of Military Valour), Italy's highest award for bravery. Pascucci's tank was a Fiat M13/40; a medium Italian tank, this tank was numerous in the desert war; while its armament (a 32-calibre long 47mm gun) was ideal for 1940 and more potent than the 40mm guns of contemporary English tanks its riveted armor of poor-quality steel was sub-par and the insufficient tropicalization of its engine components resulted in a high rate of mechanical breakdowns. In 1942 even its main gun was no longer competitive, the standard having quickly moved to high-velocity 50, 57 and 75mm weapons; only the introduction of HEAT rounds (in Italian E.P. - Effetto Pronto) kept it capable of dealing some damage against the Allied Grants and Shermans.

== Trivia ==
In the video game World of Tanks, a medal (granted following an in-game achievement) is named after Pascucci.
