= German occupation of Rome =

German attack on Rome during World War II (1943)

- Part of the Italian campaign (World War II)
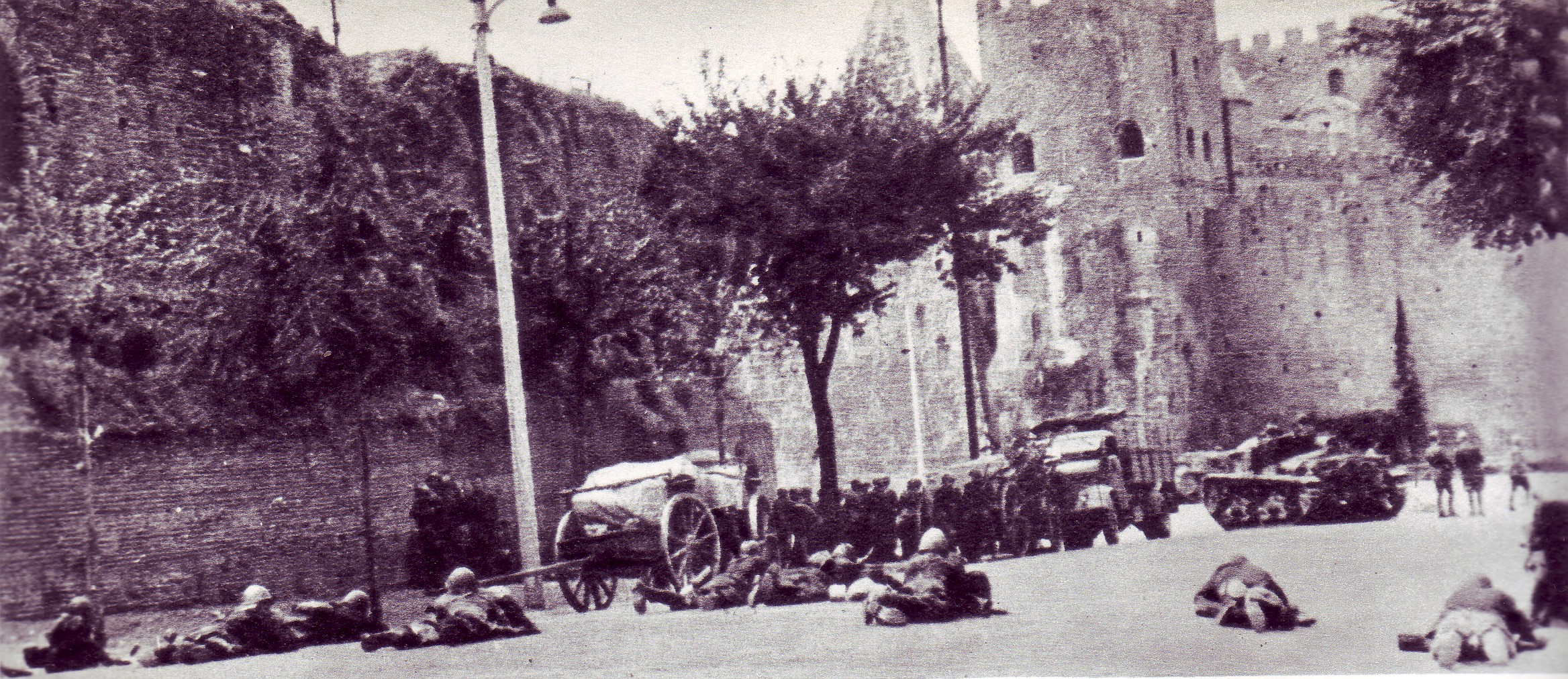
- 10 September 1943: Italian soldiers prepare to clash with Germans near Porta San Paolo.
Date	8–10 September 1943
Location	Rome
Result	German victory

Belligerents
Germany	Italy: Italian Royal Army; Italian resistance movement; I Caimani del Bell'orizzonte

Commanders and leaders
Albert Kesselring; Kurt Student	Mario Roatta; Giacomo Carboni

Strength
25,000 soldiers and 135 armored vehicles	88,000 soldiers and 381 armored vehicles

Casualties and losses
109 dead and 510 wounded	More than 1,000 dead, including 659 military personnel, 121 civilians (51 women) and about 250 unidentified people

The failed defense of Rome (also referred to as the German occupation of Rome) refers to the events that took place in the Italian capital and the surrounding area, beginning on 8 September 1943, and in the days immediately following the Armistice of Cassibile and the immediate military reaction of the German Wehrmacht forces deployed to the south and north of the city, in accordance with the operational directives established by Adolf Hitler in the event of Italian defection (Operation Achse).

Due to the absence of an organic plan for the defense of the city and a coordinated conduct of military resistance to the German occupation, as well as the simultaneous flight of Victor Emmanuel III along with the court, the head of the government and the military leadership, the city was quickly conquered by Nazi Germany's troops, which were vainly and disorganizedly opposed by the troops of the Royal Army and civilians, lacking any coherent orders, leaving about 1,000 dead on the battlefield.

From many quarters the rapid collapse of the Italian forces was blamed on the military and political leadership, who were accused of willfully failing to arrange what was necessary for the city to be adequately defended.

== Historical context ==
=== The fall of fascism and the armistice of Cassibile ===
General Vittorio Ambrosio, chief of the General Staff of the Italian armed forces, gave the first operational directives for the concentration of forces around Rome on 21 July 1943, even before the dismissal of Benito Mussolini following the events of 25 July; on that date, in fact, the so-called “Motorcycle Army Corps” was formed, which, consisting of three mobile divisions, was to protect the capital; General Giacomo Carboni assumed command of this new formation. The provisions of the Supreme Command stipulated that General Carboni's mobile unit was officially to defend Rome in the event of Allied landings on the Lazio coast, but in reality General Ambrosio, a participant in King Victor Emmanuel III's plans to remove Mussolini, intended above all to have well-equipped troops to prevent possible German-backed "Fascist countermeasures".

The "failed defense" occurred as a result of a series of contexts (actions and decisions of the political and military leadership) that rendered the fighting futile, which in any case began independently as early as the evening of 8 September and on the 10th also recorded the participation of civilians.

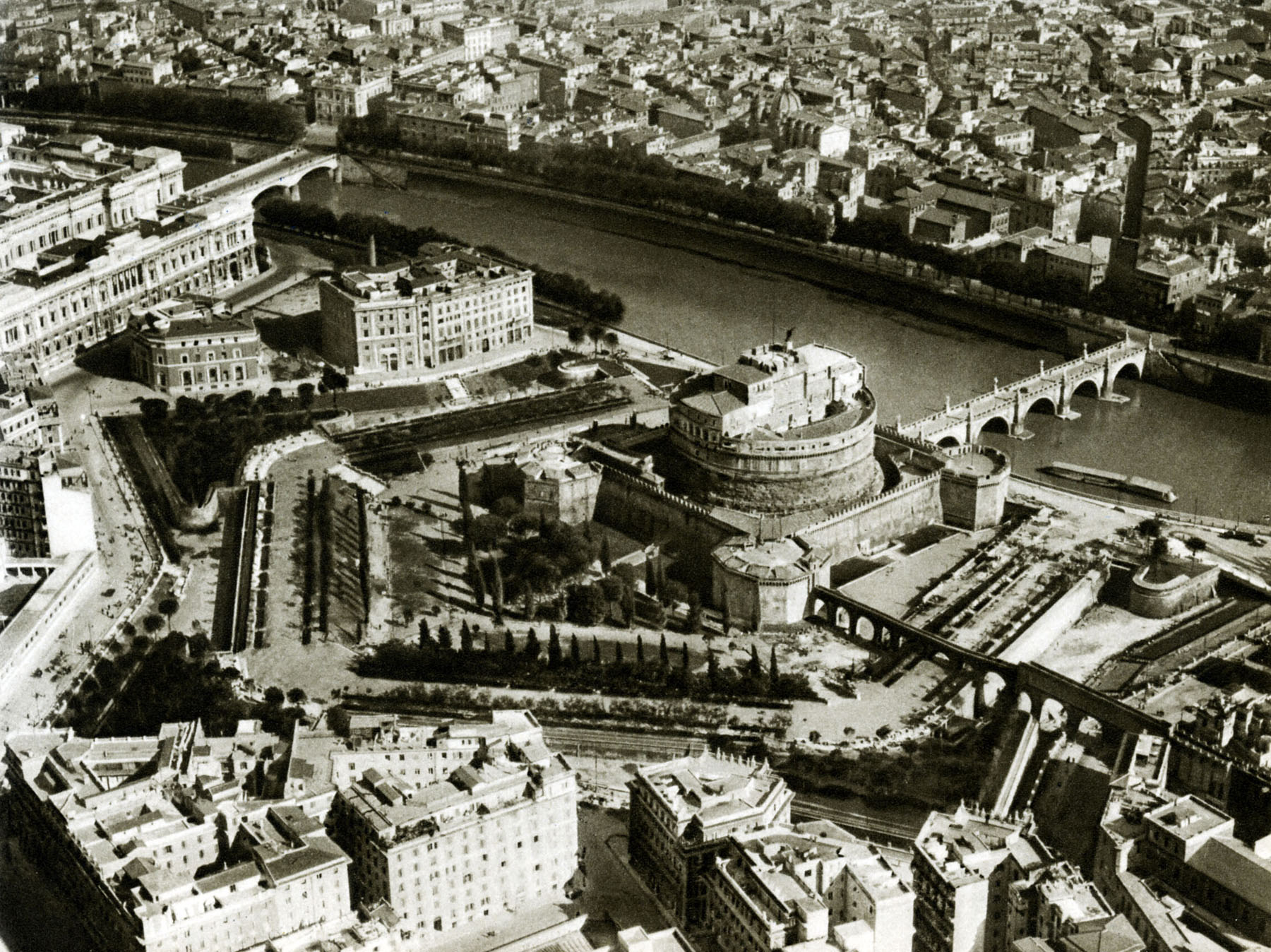
The center of Rome in an aerial view from 1938

Beginning on 9 September 1943, some units of the Regular Army attempted to prevent the Germans from occupying Rome; alongside the Italian soldiers fought a few hundred civilians, who largely rushed in a spontaneous and uncoordinated manner in order to attempt a last, and almost desperate, defense of the city; among the civilian casualties (241 according to the official tally, about 400 according to another assessment) the best known is Raffaele Persichetti. According to other estimates, 414 Italian soldiers and 183 civilians were killed in the fighting in those days, supported by units and divisions of the Motor Armored Corps and the Capital Defense, which were also joined by handfuls of private citizens.

After suffering some losses, the Germans briefly took over the capital. The unacceptable risk on the German side of seeing its forces involved for a long time in the battle for Rome, instead of being free to move quickly to the Allied beachhead at Salerno was skillfully avoided by Kesselring by engaging in negotiations with the Italian military authorities and taking advantage of the chaos within them brought about by the abandonment of command posts by most politicians and generals, followed by a deceptive "peaceful cohabitation" agreement, soon betrayed with the complete occupation of the capital by the Wehrmacht. Rome came nominally under the government of the Italian Social Republic, which was formed on 23 September 1943, but in fact was in the hands of the German military authorities, who intended in this way to exploit its great political and military value to the full. The political climate and the feelings of the population were oriented in an anti-fascist and anti-Nazi direction.

The Germans, well aware of the political value of Rome, with the presence of the Vatican, attempted to make propagandistic use of the merely formal and never recognized "open city" declaration issued by the Badoglio government, which had unilaterally declared Rome an "open city" thirty hours after the second Allied bombardment of the capital on 13 August 1943. On 11 September the military commander, General Calvi di Bergolo, issued a communiqué stating that German troops were to remain outside the city's territory; however, on the same day Field Marshal Kesselring declared that Rome was part of the war territory, that the city was subject to the German rules of war, that "strike organizers, saboteurs and sharpshooters [would] be shot," and that the Italian authorities were to "prevent all acts of sabotage and passive resistance."

=== Cancellation of Operation Giant 2 ===
The Allies, on the day the armistice was declared, were to proceed with the launch of an airborne division (Operation Giant 2) at four airfields near the capital (Cerveteri, Furbara, Centocelle and Guidonia). On the evening of 7 September two American officers (Maxwell Taylor and William Gardiner) secretly arrived in Rome to agree on the details of the operation and officially announce that an armistice was to be signed at 6:30 p.m. the next day. Prime Minister Marshal Pietro Badoglio, purposely woken up and given the late hour, argued that the Italian deployment could not hold out for more than six hours against the German troops and sent a radiogram for General Eisenhower calling for the cancellation of Operation Giant 2 and the postponement of the declaration of the armistice. In response, on the morning of 8 September General Eisenhower sent an ultimatum radiogram to Marshal Badoglio and demanded the return of the two American officers; moreover, after suspending - as requested - Operation Giant 2 at the scheduled time, he announced the stipulation of the armistice between Italy and the Allied forces from the airwaves of Radio Algiers.

=== Delaying tactics of Chief of Staff Vittorio Ambrosio ===
The Proclamation of Armistice issued by Marshal Badoglio on the evening of 8 September 1943, did not provide for any action against German forces present at the national territory and abroad, although it ambiguously concluded as follows: "Every act of hostility against the Anglo-American forces must cease on the part of the Italian forces everywhere. They will, however, react to any attacks from any other source.”

As early as the end of August, Chief of the Defence Staff Vittorio Ambrosio had drafted for the armed forces the secret directive "O.P. Memoir 44," which was signed by Army Chief of Staff Mario Roatta and made known to army commanders between 2 and 5 September 1943. This circular ordered “to disrupt at any cost, including by massive attacks on armed protection units, the railways and main Alpine railroads” and to “act with large units or mobile formations against German troops.” Circular O.P. 44 was to be destroyed by fire immediately after notification and its implementation was conditional on subsequent orders.

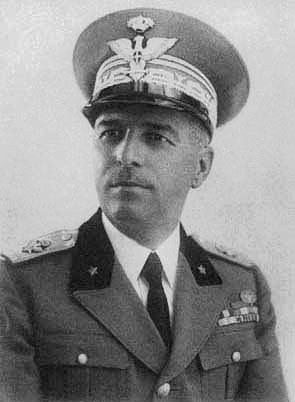
General Vittorio Ambrosio, chief of the General Staff

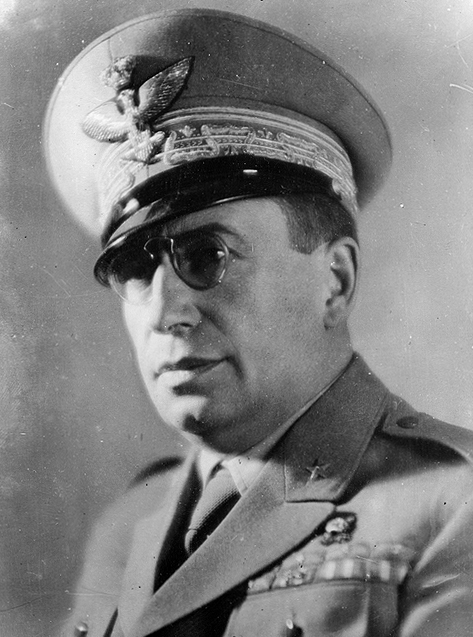
General Mario Roatta, chief of the Army General Staff

The proclamation had been broadcast over the radio at 7:42 p.m. At around 9 p.m. the king with the queen accompanied by their son Umberto and numerous aides-de-camp, ordinance officers, service personnel and a voluminous luggage, had moved to the Ministry of War; Marshal Badoglio and Duke Acquarone were already on the scene, and General Ambrosio arrived shortly afterwards. Early reports of possible German reactions seemed to be reassuring, and at first the conveners made no decisions; at 10 p.m. Badoglio retired to rest while General Ambrosio summoned General Carboni to the ministry and made arrangements so as not to hinder the peaceful passage of German troops northward through the lines of his army corps. In the first few hours among the Italian leaders, particularly General Ambrosio and General Roatta, the illusory belief prevailed that in the absence of hostile acts, the German army would give up occupying the capital and instead fall back without a fight to the north by spontaneously evacuating much of the Italian territory. General Carboni initially manifested great optimism and assured General Ambrosio that the Germans were beating a retreat; reports were coming from the German embassy of a precipitous evacuation in progress; the commander of the armored corps took no operational action and did not alert his units.

On the other hand, the situation became much more worrisome from 11 p.m. when information began to reach the command of General Roatta's Army General Staff, which had moved from Monterotondo to the Ministry of War in Via XX Settembre, about the attacks of the German troops; continuous communications about attacks also arrived from the commands of the forces stationed in the occupied territories, and all commanders asked what conduct they should take toward the Germans. General Ambrosio, however, decided not to immediately activate the famous secret directive "O.P. Memoir 44", and at 0:20 a.m. on 9 September he sent teletype No. 24202 to all armed forces confirming the need for extreme prudence and caution and ordering them not to take "initiative of hostile acts against the Germans." According to Ruggero Zangrandi, earlier General Ambrosio had sent a phonogram to Field Marshal Kesselring urging him to suspend the “hostile acts” of German troops in order to avoid a “conflict between the two armies”; only at 0:45 a.m. did the chief of staff send a late and insufficient disposition ordering, “to acts of force react with acts of force.”

The German 2nd Parachute Division, which could count on 14,000 men, began its advance from the Pratica di Mare Air Base and took possession of the Mezzocamino military depot, while fighting had already begun since 10:10 p.m. near the Magliana Bridge.

Later, the Chief of Staff felt that the order to the armed forces for implementation from Circular Op. 44 should be signed by Marshal Badoglio, but he was unable to track him down. He made a timid attempt around 5:00 a.m., to no avail. According to Ruggero Zangrandi, Badoglio would have absolutely vetoed the directive, although the marshal would later rule out that he had ever been asked for any authorization.

=== General Roatta's order ruling out the defense of Rome ===
At 4:00 a.m. on 9 September, with the battle in progress, in a meeting with Marshal Badoglio, Prince Umberto, Minister of War Antonio Sorice, Chief of Staff Ambrosio, the King's aide-de-camp Paolo Puntoni and others, General Mario Roatta prospected the necessity of the removal of the King, the government and the military commands from the Capital, renouncing the defense of Rome, in view of the worsening situation. At 5:15 a.m., General Roatta, in the presence of General Giacomo Zanussi, gave General Giacomo Carboni, commander of the Motorized-Armored Army Corps placed in defense of Rome, the order to move the 135th Armored Cavalry Division "Ariete II" and the 10th Infantry Division "Piave" to Tivoli and to dispose of a front line excluding the defense of the Capital. Roatta also informed Carboni that in Tivoli he would receive further orders from the General Staff, which would temporarily set up in Carsoli. Meanwhile (5:10 a.m. and later), Victor Emmanuel III and his family, Prime Minister Marshal Badoglio, Chiefs of Staff Ambrosio and Roatta and military ministers (except General Antonio Sorice) were already on the run, heading for Brindisi.

Shortly after 7:30 a.m., General Carboni went to Tivoli to organize the new troop deployment and receive further orders. Unable to locate Roatta he continued to Arsoli where he learned that the column of sovereigns and Marshal Badoglio was now far away and that Roatta's 5:15 a.m. order had been confirmed. Carboni, therefore, arranged to set up his command in Tivoli, that is, far from Rome.

=== Autonomous initiatives of Marshal Caviglia and General Calvi di Bergolo ===
On the morning of 8 September, officially because of "private matters," Marshal Enrico Caviglia had arrived in Rome and obtained an audience with the king at 9:00 a.m. the next day. On the 9th, however, having been informed of the king's absence, Caviglia headed to the Ministry of War and, by virtue of his hierarchically higher rank, independently assumed the role of deputy to the head of the government, with the consent of Antonio Sorice, minister of war in the Badoglio government. The senior marshal immediately took steps to contact the Germans for a cease-fire and, as the fighting raged, had the radio announce that “the city was quiet and that negotiations were being held with the German authorities.”

On the afternoon of 9 September, General Giorgio Carlo Calvi di Bergolo, the king's son-in-law, and Colonel Giuseppe di Montezemolo, sent by Caviglia to Frascati, met with the German commander Albert Kesselring, who demanded, as conditions for the continuation of negotiations, the surrender of the entire Italian Motorised Army Corps. As a result of these contacts, between 4 p.m. and 5 p.m. on 9 September, the Grenadiers of Sardinia were verbally ordered from Rome to leave the disputed Magliana Bridge for an agreed transit of German troops to the north. In the evening, the new positions on which the grenadiers had established themselves were again overrun by the German division, which continued to advance toward the center of Rome. During the night, the police seized most of the weapons previously distributed to civilians by General Giacomo Carboni.

By the morning of the 10th, the streets of the now besieged capital were plastered with posters warning the population that negotiations with the Germans were well under way. The surrender agreement was signed at the War Ministry at 4 p.m. on 10 September between Lt. Col. Leandro Giaccone, on behalf of General Calvi di Bergolo, and Field Marshal Kesselring.

== Troops deployed around Rome ==
Immediately after the armistice announcement, made by Pietro Badoglio via radio at 7:42 p.m. on 8 September 1943, the Germans began operations aimed at the occupation of Italian territory, including the capital, and the neutralization of Italian troops deployed on all fronts, according to the previously drawn up plans of Operation Achse.

Around the capital, on the eve of the German occupation there was in fact a strong contingent of Italian troops who, however, left without coherent orders and without a plan of defense, were overwhelmed or disarmed with relative ease by German troops inferior in numbers though not in armaments.

By the early hours of 9 September, the Italian units arrayed on the coast had already been neutralized by German attacks, and the head of the government Pietro Badoglio and the king (who held the position of commander of the armed forces) were fleeing toward Pescara. General Mario Roatta, Chief of Staff of the Army, upon leaving to follow the king, ordered the retreat to Tivoli of all divisions of the capital's defense force, excluding only the Grenadiers of Sardinia, which was already under attack, in effect giving up effective defense of the city.

On the morning of 10 September the German vanguards invaded Rome, counterattacked at various points in the urban belt and, in some cases, close to the center, by the spontaneous and uncoordinated reaction of individual military divisions and civilians in arms who, together, resisted the organized and coordinated assault of the German troops, leaving 1,167 dead among the military and about 120 civilians on the field, including dozens of women and even a nun engaged as a nurse on the front lines.

=== Italian forces ===
The deployment of Italian troops around and in the city of Rome just before the German attack included:

Rome Army Corps, in charge of “internal defense” and consisting of the

12th Infantry Division “Sassari”, on:

Command Company
151st Infantry Regiment “Sassari”
152nd Infantry Regiment “Sassari”
34th Artillery Regiment
XII 81 mm Mortar Battalion
XII Self-propelled 47/32 Battalion
V Infantry Sapper Battalion
CXII Mixed Engineer Battalion

2nd Chemical Battalion.
8th Engineer Regiment
XXI Engineer Battalion
Carabinieri units of the squadron group of the Rome Territorial Legion and Carabinieri Cadet Battalion
Units of the Guardia di Finanza
Depot and Training Battalion, 2nd Bersaglieri Regiment
Depot and Training Squadron Group, “Genoa Cavalry” Regiment
Depot, 81st Infantry Regiment “Torino”
“Cheren” column of the Italian African Police.
Motorized Assault Battalion.
Numerous logistics, training and garrison units within the city of Rome, including anti-aircraft defense personnel, airmen, sailors and financiers.

Motorized-Armored Army Corps, in charge of “external defense” and consisting of the

135th Armored Division “Ariete II,” deployed around Lake Bracciano between the Monterosi-Manziana junction to the north and the La Storta junction to the south, on:

Command Squadron
10th Armored Regiment Lancieri di Vittorio Emanuele II
16th Motorized Cavalry Regiment of Lucca
8th Regiment “Lancieri di Montebello.”
135th Armored Artillery Regiment
235th Self-propelled Artillery Regiment
CXXXV Anti-Tank Self-Propelled Guns Battalion
XXXV Mixed Engineer Battalion

10th Infantry Division "Piave," distributed in an arc immediately north of the city, between the locality of Ottavia on the Via Trionfale, the Giustiniana on the Via Cassia and the two banks of the Tiber River, between the Via Flaminia and Via Salaria near Castel Giubileo, on:

Command Company
57th Infantry Regiment “Abruzzi”
58th Infantry Regiment
20th Artillery Regiment
X 81 mm Mortar Battalion
X Anti-Tank Battalion
X Mixed Engineer Battalion

136th Armored Division “Centauro II”, deployed in an arc east of the center, along the Via Tiburtina, between the towns of Lunghezza and Monte Celio, just west of Tivoli, on:

Command Company
131st Tank Regiment
Motorized Legionary Regiment
136th Artillery Regiment
136th Mixed Engineer Battalion
18th Bersaglieri Regiment

21st Infantry Division “Grenadiers of Sardinia,” arranged in an arc immediately on the southern flank of the city, between Magliana and Tor Sapienza, to control the Aurelia, Ostiense, Appia and Casilina roads, on:

Command Company
1st Regiment "Grenadiers of Sardinia"
2nd Regiment “Grenadiers of Sardinia”
13th Regiment Artillery “Grenadiers of Sardinia”
XXI 81mm Mortar Battalion
CCXXI Anti-Tank Battalion
XXI Mixed Engineer Battalion

Army Corps Headquarters Motorised Department
1st Fast Artillery Regiment “Eugene of Savoy.”
Depot and Training Battalion, 4th Tank Regiment
11th Engineer Regiment

17th Army Corps, in charge of “coastal defense” and consisting of the

103rd Infantry Division "Piacenza," deployed in the southwestern quadrant of the Roman countryside, between Via Ostiense and Via Appia, on the juncture between Ostia and Velletri, on:

Command Company
111th Infantry Regiment
112th Infantry Regiment
36th Artillery Regiment
CXII 81mm Mortar Battalion
CXII Anti-Tank Battalion
CXI Mixed Engineer Battalion

220th Coastal Division, deployed between Orbetello and Fiumicino, on:

Command Company
111th Coastal Infantry Regiment
152nd Coastal Infantry Regiment
Four Groups of infantry squadrons "Genoa Cavalry"
CCCXXV Coastal Infantry Battalion
CVIII Coastal Artillery Group

221st Coastal Division, deployed between Fiumicino and Anzio, on:

Command Company
4th Coastal Infantry Regiment
8th Coastal Infantry Regiment
An Infantry Squadron Group “Savoia Cavalry”
Sabaudia Artillery School
Coast Artillery School of Torre Olevola
Coast Artillery School of Gaeta

10th Armored Regiment

These units were reinforced on the morning of 9 September by the arrival of:

elements of the 7th Infantry Division “Lupi di Toscana,” deployed on the Via Aurelia near Ladispoli on the northern Tyrrhenian coast.
elements of the 13th Infantry Division “Re,” on the Via Cassia in La Storta, just north of the capital.

These units were part of the influx of the respective divisions, traveling from the north to reinforce the Italian force to protect the capital, which were caught by the armistice still en route and disbanded before reaching their destination.

The total Italian forces available for the defense of Rome amounted to a total of 88,137 men, 124 tanks, 257 self-propelled vehicles, 122 armored cars and Saharan trucks, and 615 artillery pieces. This was a group of forces of heterogeneous composition and quality but sizeable and comprising well-equipped units (such as the Ariete II and the Sassari) or at least solidly framed units (such as the Grenadieri di Sardegna or the 10th Arditi Regiment), which if used in a decisive and unified manner could have validly countered the German forces in the area.

=== German forces ===
The German troops, in addition to personnel in transit to the south and an under-staffed number of police, liaison and support personnel present in the city and at military installations and routes of communication with the front (then in Calabria, but in the meantime the Allied landing in Salerno was also taking place), were in fact present with only two large units, organized as follows:

11th Airborne Army Corps (General Kurt Student)

2nd Parachute Division (General Walter Barenthin), deployed in the vicinity of Pratica di Mare Air Base, facing the "Piacenza," on:

2nd Parachute Regiment
6th Parachute Regiment
7th Parachute Regiment
2nd Parachute Artillery Regiment
2nd Parachute Anti-Tank Battalion
2nd Parachute Engineer Battalion
The division had been airborne without warning from Provence immediately after 25 July and had effectively assumed control of the important airfield immediately south of Rome.
On 8 September 1943 the 2nd Battalion of the 6th Regiment was detached to the Foggia airfield.
In contrast, the I Battalion of the 7th Regiment and the self-propelled company of the Anti-Tank Battalion were detached to Frascati.

3rd Panzergrenadier Division (General Fritz-Hubert Gräser), deployed north of Rome in front of “Ariete II,” between Orvieto and Lake Bolsena, on:

8th Grenadier Regiment
29th Grenadier Regiment
3rd Artillery Regiment
103rd Self-propelled Battalion
103rd Reconnaissance Battalion
3rd Anti-Tank Battalion
3rd Engineer Battalion
Kampfgruppe Büsing (detached from the 26th Panzer-Division).
This was a newly reconstituted unit (June 1943, after being annihilated at Stalingrad), still undergoing training and with partially incomplete staffing, equipment, and supplies.

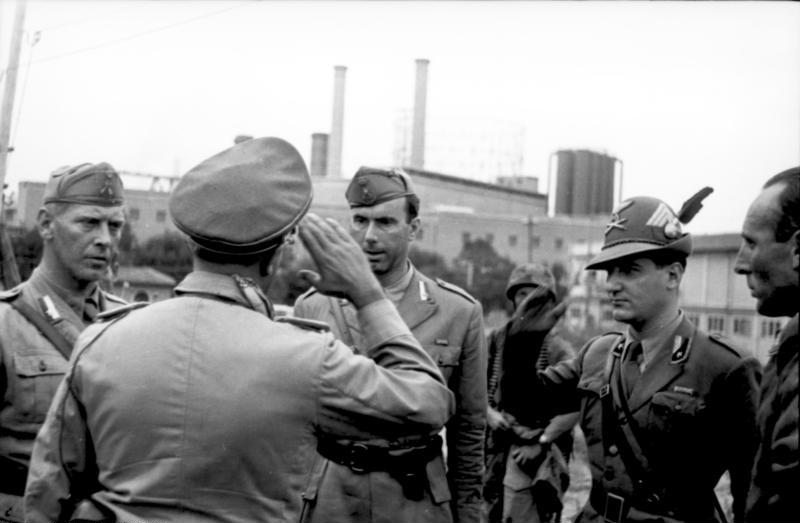
Italian officers of the Sassari Division negotiate an end to fighting in the Porta San Paolo area.(10 September 1943, beside the General Markets on Via Ostiense, near the outlet of the new Ostiense flyover. Approximately 41°52′2.18″N 12°28′50.83″E

To these units should be added the support and protection personnel of Field Marshal Albert Kesselring's German Southern Italy Command located at Villa Torlonia in Frascati, which, however, had been completely destroyed in a heavy Allied aerial bombardment carried out from 12 noon to 2 p.m. on 8 September 1943 by 130 U.S. B-17s. The bombing claimed the lives of some 500 civilians and 200 German soldiers, and devastated the historic town, but left the German commander and most of his staff unharmed. It took several hours, however, to fully re-establish contact with the eight German divisions (including the two deployed south and north of the capital) at that time under Kesselring's orders, although those around Rome were well connected by radio and field telephones.

The two German divisions could thus count on a total of 25,033 men, 71 tanks, 54 self-propelled vehicles, 196 armored cars and armored vehicles, and 165 artillery pieces.

These forces constituted an unevenly deployed ensemble, with the concentration of almost all heavy equipment north of Rome framed in a division of suboptimal quality, and a division of high quality but with only light armament to the south.

== The fighting ==
The fighting on 8 and 9 September 1943

The pincer movement of the two German divisions converging on the city from the south and north, respectively, overwhelmed in a short time the reaction of the few units that, on the initiative of individual officers and with the support of the civilian population, had attacked them from La Storta, at Montagnola and at Porta San Paolo, and the Germans took control of the capital in a short time, while the large Italian units as a whole - twice as numerous as the enemy in numbers - remained paralyzed in the absence of coherent orders, and thus fell prey to the former ally, without even being able to fight it.

Nevertheless, the units that on their own initiative opposed the invader did not spare themselves in the extreme defense of the city: 1,167 were the fallen soldiers and, among them, 13 were decorated with the Gold Medal for Military Valor, and 27 with the Silver Medal for Military Valor.

=== Monterosi, Bracciano, Manziana ===
On the Via Cassia, the Ariete Armored Division was preparing a defensive stronghold, for the protection of which Second Lieutenant Ettore Rosso and a group of sappers from the CXXXIV Mixed Engineer Battalion were laying a mine field. Upon the arrival of the Grosser kampfgruppe of the 3rd Panzergrenadier-Division, consisting of about thirty armored vehicles and two motorized infantry battalions, Rosso placed two trucks across the road to block the pass. The Germans then intimated to clear the road within fifteen minutes: instead of obeying, Rosso, along with four volunteers he had kept with him after sending the rest of the unit back, completed the defensive works and, as the Germans advanced, opened fire and then blew up the barrage, involving the Italians in the blast; in the time it took the Germans to reorganize, the stronghold was prepared for defense. For the episode, Lieutenant Rosso was awarded the Gold Medal of Military Valor and the chosen sappers, Pietro Colombo, Gino Obici, Gelindo Trombini and Augusto Zaccanti were awarded the Silver Medal of Military Valor.

In the ensuing clash, the 2nd Cavalry Regiment of Lucca and the 3rd Group of the 135th Artillery Regiment on 149/19 howitzers thwarted the German advance, with losses on both sides; the balance was four tanks lost, 20 killed and about fifty wounded on the Italian side, about as many men and a few more tanks on the German side; the German advance was halted for the rest of the day.

This and other episodes of resistance by units of Ariete Division II in the area of Bracciano and Manziana blocked the attacks of the 3rd Panzergrenadier-Division, which, partly as a result of the order to retreat and concentrate the entire Motorized-Armored Army Corps in the Tivoli area on the eastern side of Rome, preferred to limit itself to bypassing the defensive perimeter of the capital from the western side and heading undisturbed south toward the Salerno area to counter Anglo-American landings.

=== Monterotondo ===
In 1943 Palazzo Orsini Barberini was the headquarters of the General Staff of the Royal Italian Army for a few months.

At dawn on 9 September 1943, following the armistice with the Anglo-Americans, the Germans with a deployment of 800 paratroopers from Foggia, led by Major Walter Gericke attempted the capture of Army Chief of Staff Mario Roatta, convinced of his presence in the palace: he had instead left the previous evening, immediately after Badoglio declared the armistice.

The location was hotly contested by the Italian army units (among them the units of the “Piave” and “Re” divisions and the 2nd Arab Assault Company) present in the vicinity, by the garrison Carabinieri and also by armed citizens who had intervened in the meantime, and cost the Germans 33 dead and 88 wounded while the Italians had 125 killed and 145 wounded, including 14 Carabinieri. At the time of the surrender stipulated in Rome, the German paratroopers, barricaded in the palace they had conquered, were under a tight siege by Italian troops.

As a result of these events, decorations were awarded to Vittorio Premoli of the 57th Infantry Regiment “Piave” (Gold Medal of Military Valor), to Carabiniere Giuseppe Cannata, who after strenuous defense of a roadblock was shot dead (Silver Medal of Military Valor), to young Ortensi (Silver Medal of Military Valor), to Carabinieri Lieutenant Raffaele Vessichelli (commander of an autonomous group mobilized with the task of defense and security of the Palazzo Orsini Barberini), Major Lorenzo Bellin, Sergeant Ettore Minicucci, Carabinieri officer Fausto Garrone (Bronze Medal of Military Valor) and Carabiniere Cesare Tassetto (Badge of Honor - wounded in war).

=== South of Rome ===
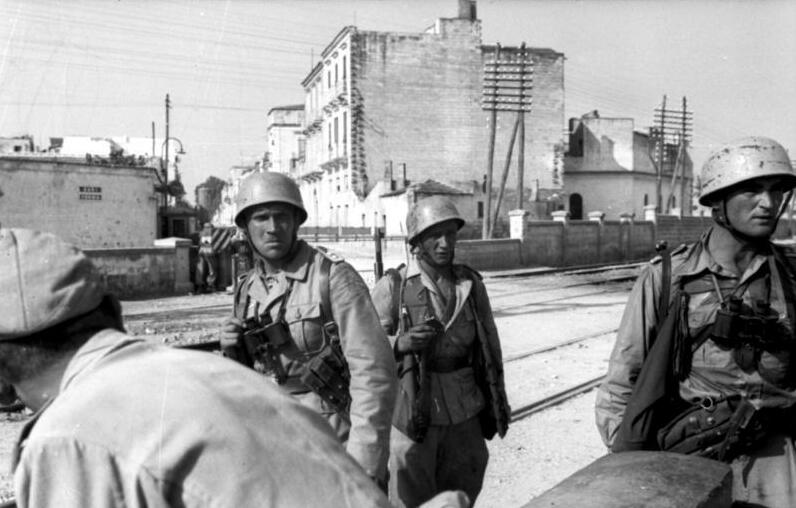
German Fallschirmjäger of the 2nd Parachute Division in the area south of Rome.

Upon the announcement of the armistice (7:45 p.m. 8 September), the German 2nd Parachute Division, stationed at the Pratica di Mare Air Base and with a strength of about 14,000 men, moved immediately, heading toward the capital and leaving the Piacenza Division, stationed at Lanuvio, Albano and Ardea, on its right. At 8:30 p.m. German paratroopers seized the Mezzocammino Army Depot, with millions of liters of fuel, lightly guarded by the 2nd Chemical Battalion. Continuing to advance on the routes converging on Rome from the coast, the Germans faced the defensive perimeter arranged by the Grenadier Division of Sardinia under the energetic command of General Gioacchino Solinas.

The arc covered by the “Granatieri” stretched from Via di Boccea to Via Collatina in 11 strongholds. The Germans, to stall for time, immediately attempted negotiations, but Solinas replied that he would grant “harmless passage” to the north only on condition of the release of the Mezzocammino depot, weapons and captured prisoners. As the Germans hesitated, he ordered the fire, which started at exactly 10:10 p.m. from a mortar battery installed on Exposition Hill E42 (Caposaldo No. 5), which controlled access to the Magliana Bridge (the only Tiber crossing point outside the urban circle).

The battle was ignited at strongholds Nos. 5, 6 (Tre Fontane), 7 and 8. The first Italian casualty was 21-year-old PAI (Italian African Police) guard Amerigo Sterpetti, fighting near the Magliana Bridge, who was to be awarded the Silver Medal of Military Valor. The bridge was lost at 1:00 a.m., recaptured and lost again in the night, and finally recaptured by the Italians at 7:00 a.m. on 9 September by a contingent also composed of Lancieri di Montebello, Carabinieri and PAI guards.

Beginning on the evening of the 9th, following contacts made between the Italian and German high commands, the "Grenadier" division began its orderly retreat to positions further inland, so as to leave the disputed Magliana Bridge for an agreed transit of German troops to the north. In total, the grenadiers and other aggregated formations had left 27 dead at the Magliana Bridge, including, in addition to Sterpetti, gold medalists Orlando De Tommaso and Vincenzo Pandolfo.

However, the new positions on which the grenadiers had established themselves were again overrun by the German division, which, contrary to agreements, continued to advance toward the center of Rome. Fighting resumed around the Esposizione hill (present-day EUR district), where there were another 16 casualties, on the Via Laurentina (4 casualties), in the Tre Fontane locality and at the Ostiense Fort (so-called "Montagnola di San Paolo") where, as a result of contradictory orders from the high commands, the Italian troops failed to arrange an organized defense. The more experienced and better commanded German troops thus had a good time overpowering or outflanking the Italian outposts one after another. On the morning of 10 September, between Tre Fontane, Forte Ostiense and Montagnola, the military counted another 42 casualties.

Around noon on the 10th, the defensive line of the “Grenadiers” had been reduced to the Aurelian Walls, near Porta San Paolo, Porta San Sebastiano and Porta San Giovanni. The extreme resistance was fueled by the intervention of the Lancieri di Montebello, the 4th Tank Infantry Regiment, the Genova Cavalry, the II Bersaglieri and the Allievi Carabinieri, with civilian volunteers also participating in the fighting.

By the time the Italian forces' surrender agreement was signed and a cease-fire established, German troops were now breaking into the historic center unchallenged: the last significant fighting took place at the archaeological promenade, while attempts by other divisions of the "Ariete II" and "Centauro" to reach the theater of fighting to the south were interrupted by the arrival of the outcome of negotiations between the high commands.

== Civilian participation in the defense of Rome ==
=== Distribution of weapons to civilians on the night of 8 September ===
At 8:30 p.m. on 8 September 1943, Communists Luigi Longo and Antonello Trombadori (a former officer of the Bersaglieri, wounded in the Albanian War) and Catholic Adriano Ossicini met with General Giacomo Carboni, commander of the Motorized-Armored Army Corps post of Rome, to have a shipment of weapons delivered to them to distribute to the population in preparation for the German attack. The weapons were loaded onto three trucks and deposited during the night at cellars and businesses, including the backroom of barber Rosica in Via Silla 91 (Prati district), the historical museum of the bersaglieri in Porta Pia, Scattoni's workshop in Via Galvani (Testaccio) and Collati's bicycle workshop in Campo de' Fiori. Weapons stored in Via Galvani were used at Porta San Paolo by adherents of the Catholic Communist Movement, while much of the remaining cargo was seized on the night of 9-10 September by the police on the orders of Commander Carmine Senise.

=== Contacts between antifascist politicians and remaining authorities ===
At dawn on 9 September 1943, while the Grenadier Division was engaged in the defense of the Magliana Bridge, in the city that had been abandoned to itself, political groups struggled to get their bearings on the situation and to make contact with government organs.

At 8 a.m. on 9 September, at the headquarters of the National Combatant Association, located in Piazza Grazioli, a large number of people discussed how to deal with the Germans. Before any action was taken, retired General Sabato Martelli Castaldi and two other officers went to the Quirinal, to communicate verbally the intention to organize the defense of Rome. Arriving at the Quirinal at around 8:45 a.m., they discovered that the king, Badoglio, the minister of war and the highest ranks of the army had already fled, heading for Pescara.

In the early morning hours, after a meeting of Labour Democracy, Meuccio Ruini and Ivanoe Bonomi were sent to the Viminale (then the seat of government) to ask for information.

After arrangements made during the night, members of the Action Party, including Raffaele Persichetti and Pilo Albertelli, also met. During the meeting, the delegates received a call from the Cesare Battisti Hospital (today: Carlo Forlanini Hospital), informing them of the fighting raging near the Magliana Bridge. The conveners decided to take action, but they were out of weapons.

Actionist Vincenzo Baldazzi managed to get hold of some weapons and saw to it that they were distributed among civilians, although he was almost arrested by the police.

=== First garrison at the basilica of St. Paul ===
At 9:00 a.m. a group of Actionists passed through the Imperial Fora, heading for the Basilica of St. Paul to fight the Germans; 24-year-old Carla Capponi, a Communist sympathizer, joined them and offered to fight, but was unable to obtain weapons.

A field hospital was set up; some nuns assisted the wounded and began to line up the first corpses. Unable to fight, Carla Capponi went back along Via Ostiense and, near the general markets, met a group of women with basins filled with boiled potatoes for the soldiers. The provisions were distributed around two o'clock, three o'clock in the afternoon, in the rear of the Basilica. Capponi and the other women did their best throughout the afternoon and the entire night to assist the wounded.

=== Creation of the National Liberation Committee ===
At 4:30 p.m., in Via Carlo Poma, the CLN - National Liberation Committee - was formed.

In the afternoon, a group of civilians including medical student Rosario Bentivegna, a future Gappist, attempted an action against the infantry barracks on Viale Giulio Cesare to obtain weapons, but were defeated. However, the assault convinced a squadron of the regiment to deploy the next day at Porta San Paolo, under the command of Lieutenant Maurizio Giglio.

=== Fort Ostiense ===
The clashes on 10 September 1943

The Gaetano Giardino Institute, attached to Fort Ostiense, housed about four hundred war orphans and mentally handicapped children, cared for by thirty-five Franciscan nuns, under the direction of Don Pietro Occelli.

On 10 September eight hundred grenadiers were barricaded in the courtyards and dungeons of the fort. Shortly after 6:00 a.m. a dense and sustained rifle fire announced that the Germans were now established at EUR, in the present Palace of Italian Civilization, in the Exposition office building and on the shelves of the parish basilica of Saints Peter and Paul. The grenadiers returned fire with Carcano rifles and machine gun fire, but suffered casualties.

The first wounded were taken to the Institute's infirmary and were cared for by the nuns. At 7:00 a.m. from a clearing of the Palace of Italian Civilization a mortar of German paratroopers began to shell the bastion of the fort, where the grenadiers were stationed. Some paratroopers crossed today's Via Cristoforo Colombo and Via Ostiense and, with some flamethrowers, set fire to the first structures of the religious institute.

Don Pietro Occelli, the institute's director, took it upon himself to announce the surrender by raising a white sheet over a pole.

Meanwhile, the nuns provided blouses, shirts and other clothing to the surviving soldiers in order to save them from capture. Sister Teresina di Sant'Anna, born Cesarina D'Angelo, a native of Amatrice, was arranging the corpse of an Italian soldier in the chapel of Fort Ostiense; a German soldier passing by was attracted by the shining of a gold chain that a fallen man had around his neck and tried to snatch it. Sister Teresina grabbed the metal crucifix she was about to place on the soldier's chest and repeatedly struck the soldier in the face, who pounced on the nun. At that instant other people appeared in the chapel and the soldier ran away. Sister Teresina, already seriously ill, would die eight months later, on 8 May 1944, in a clinic on Via Trionfale.

=== The Montagnola ===
Having occupied the fort, the battle continued around two small strongholds, in the fields around the Montagnola and the house of baker Quirino Roscioni, a veteran of the Great War. From those positions, grenadiers, sappers and a few commoners sustained incessant fire from the German troops and, with some carabinieri stationed in the houses on Via Pomposa, fought the Germans on Via Laurentina, preventing them from entering Via Ostiense as far as Porta San Paolo.

Having run out of ammunition, Quirino Roscioni fled to the nearest parish, but was killed along with his sister-in-law by machine gun fire.

=== Porta San Paolo ===
Advancing beyond the Montagnola, German troops marched onto the Via Ostiense where, late in the morning, improvised squads from the Communist Party, Bandiera Rossa and the Republican Party fought between the Basilica of San Paolo, the general markets and the Rome-Pisa railroad bridge.

Aladino Govoni, future military commander of Bandiera rossa and captain of the grenadiers was on temporary leave for family reasons; after rushing unarmed to the Magliana, he had his service pistol brought to him and fought on the Ostiense. With him was a 16-year-old boy, Antonio Calvani, who had run away from home to follow him. During the fight, Calvani took possession of the jacket and weapons of a fallen grenadier and began firing on the enemy. Wounded several times, he continued fighting and died.

Porta San Paolo became the last bastion of resistance, protected by barricades and car wrecks. Fighting there were the Granatieri di Sardegna Division, commanded by General Gioacchino Solinas, the Carabinieri of the Rome Territorial Legion, the Lancieri di Montebello, the Genova Cavalry squadron, and some divisions of the Sassari Division.

Seventeen-year-old Maurizio Cecati died there. He was perhaps the first fallen in the liberation struggle to be recognized as a partisan; he was awarded a posthumous medal.

Actionist Vincenzo Baldazzi, with some volunteers, stationed himself near the Pyramid of Cestius. There, at the height of Via delle Conce, two German tanks were destroyed. Meanwhile, in Trastevere, lawyer Ugo Baglivo, also of the Action Party, armed only with a tricolor flag, attempted to organize other volunteer formations to flank the military.

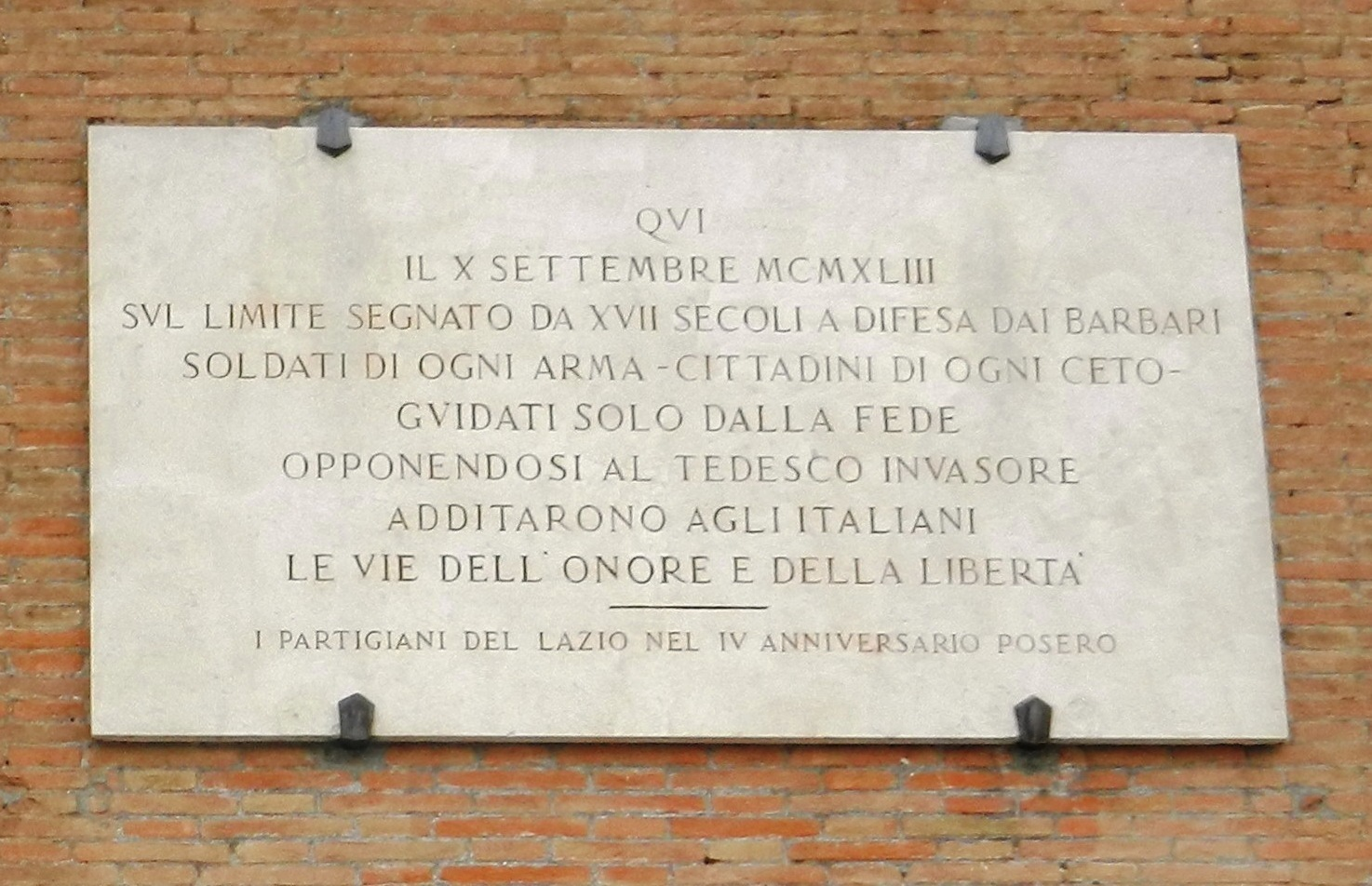
Memorial plaque of the Battle of Porta San Paolo (10 September 1943)

Sandro Pertini led the first groups of armed socialists alongside the grenadiers, throwing stones at the Germans; for such actions, Pertini would also be awarded the Gold Medal of Military Valor. With him were union leader Bruno Buozzi, future ministers Emilio Lussu, Mario Zagari and Giuliano Vassalli, Giuseppe Gracceva (future commander of the Matteotti Brigades in Rome) and Alfredo Monaco.

Also taking part in the fighting were Romualdo Chiesa, Alcide Moretti and Adriano Ossicini of the Catholic Communist movement; Fabrizio Onofri of the PCI and students Mario Fiorentini and Marisa Musu, future Gappisti. Young Giaime Pintor also called on the people to support the resistance of the armed units.

Sabato Martelli Castaldi and Roberto Lordi arrived at Porta San Paolo and joined the fighters. They would both be part of the Resistance.

At about 12:30 p.m., on the line of fire at Porta San Paolo, actionist Raffaele Persichetti, a disabled veteran and retired officer, rushed in civilian dress and deployed against the superior German forces in command of a squad that had been left without a commander. Around 2 p.m. he was seen leaving with his jacket stained with blood; at his side was Adriano Ossicini. Nearby was Maria Teresa Regard, a student member of the Communist Party and future Gappist; rushing to provide food for the fighters along with Maria Michetti and other women, she saw Persichetti fall in Viale Giotto. Persichetti would be awarded the Gold Medal of Military Valor in memoriam and the street next to Porta San Paolo would be dedicated to him.

At 5 p.m., the Germans took Porta San Paolo; while Second Lieutenant Enzo Fioritto tried to slow them down with a desperate action, the will to fight still animated a crowd of demonstrators led by actor Carlo Ninchi from the side of the Testaccio district.

At the same time Filippo Caracciolo and Emilio Lussu, armed with a Beretta 7.65, rushed in, attempting to rejoin Baldazzi's formation, but were immediately forced to fall back by the advancing enemy. Ossicini led the survivors of his squad through the non-Catholic cemetery to Campo Testaccio, where the patriots dispersed.

Carla Capponi also fled to the archaeological walk. At home, her mother had already taken in two straggling soldiers.

=== Porta San Giovanni ===
The surrender to the Germans was signed at 4 p.m., but the center of Rome was still the scene of war.

In a last-ditch defense, some grenadiers blocked the arches of Porta San Giovanni with streetcars from the nearby Santa Croce depot, gathering about a hundred men, including military and civilians. The number of casualties is unknown. The battle lasted two hours, until the final breakthrough of the enemy, who captured the last survivors.

=== Final resistance ===
Near the Palazzo Massimo, fourteen-year-old Carlo Del Papa, joining a platoon of soldiers, destroyed an enemy tank by throwing a grenade. Moving to Via Gioberti to support an Italian armored car, he lost his life alongside infantryman Agostino Minnucci.

Arriving in Piazza dei Cinquecento, the Germans, together with some former fascist militiamen, occupied the Continental Hotel, where they placed their machine guns in the windows. In the square, soldiers and armed civilians fired on the hotel. A streetcar driver, a porter and three young men came out of their positions to hit - successfully - the windows of the third and fourth floors. The streetcar driver threw two hand grenades toward the building, but was machine-gunned and died after being dragged under cover by his comrades. Other young men, in turn, came out into the open to throw more grenades, but one of them was shot dead. The last shots toward the Continental were fired by some students, who were stationed between the arcades of the square and were killed as a result of the firefight. A girl who had come to provide aid also died. The shooting ceased at 9 p.m., but some shots would be heard around the city on the morning of 11 September as well.

A total of 183 civilians died in the defense of Rome, including 27 women.

== The surrender ==
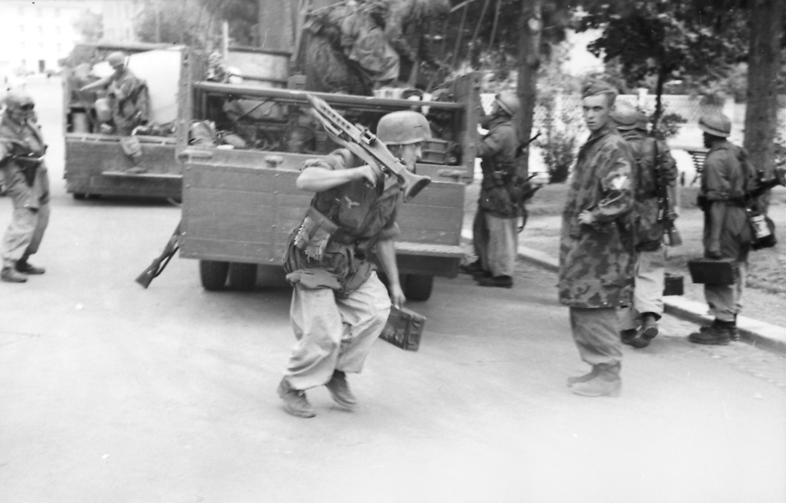
German paratroopers in Corso Trieste during the disarming of the Piave Division, following the end of the fighting.

The surrender document was signed on 10 September at 4 p.m. by Lieutenant Colonel Leandro Giaccone, while on behalf of Field Marshal Albert Kesselring signed his chief of staff, General Siegfried Westphal. The agreement stipulated that Rome would remain an open city, but the city was subsequently occupied by German troops who quickly rushed in from both the south and the north. Immediately thereafter, all units of the Royal Army in the area were disarmed and disbanded, excluding part of the Piave Division, which remained in arms to ensure law and order under the “Open City Command of Rome” (entrusted to General Giorgio Carlo Calvi di Bergolo), until these troops were also disarmed by the Germans on 23 September 1943, after the proclamation of the Italian Social Republic.

== Historical consequences ==
Among the consequences of the German occupation of Rome was the deportation of numerous civilians, as well as the Ardeatine massacre and other acts of violence. The fact that King Victor Emmanuel III and the political and military leadership had fled to Brindisi did not, in the eyes of the population, relieve the officers in charge of coordinating the defense of the capital of responsibility, especially considering that, in a memo delivered on 24 April 1943 to members of the British cabinet by Foreign Secretary Anthony Eden, it was stated that “the series of Axis defeats in Russia and North Africa and the difficult condition of its expeditionary force in Tunisia were prompting the Italians to hope for a quick victory of the Allies in order to get out of the war.” However, there were Italian troops around Rome totaling more than 80,000 men, which could have countered the Germans in their goal of securing control of the Italian capital and to make a quick influx of troops and reinforcement materials at that time essential to repel the Allied landing at Salerno.

=== The commission of inquiry ===
Regarding these events, a commission of inquiry was created on 19 October 1944, and on 5 March 1945 it communicated its findings to Prime Minister Ivanoe Bonomi and Minister of War Alessandro Casati. The commission was chaired by Undersecretary of War Mario Palermo, and for this reason also called the “Palermo Commission,” and composed of generals Pietro Ago and Luigi Amantea. Both of these generals had been appointed senators during Fascism and had joined the Italian Social Republic during the German occupation of Rome.

A large part of the minutes were covered by state secrecy, due to military defense requirements, and only made public in 1965. They consist of 190 files containing minutes of interrogations, service reports, and questionnaires compiled on the basis of statements made by about a hundred informants who were contacted. Part of the material consists of reports originally produced for the “Commission for the Examination of the Conduct of General Officers and Colonels” or for the General Staff, SIM or other military bodies.

As for the military responsibility for the fall of Rome, Generals Mario Roatta and Giacomo Carboni were indicted, tried and acquitted on 19 February 1949.

== Honors ==
=== Individual Gold Medals of Military Valor ===
- Sgt. Maj. Udino Bombieri (10th Regiment “Lancieri di Vittorio Emanuele II”)
- Capt. Orlando De Tommaso (Legione Allievi Carabinieri)
- Capt. Francesco Vannetti Donnini (4th Regiment “Genova Cavalry”)
- Sub Lt. Vincenzo Fioritto (4th Tank Regiment)
- Capt. Romolo Fugazza (8th Regiment “Lancieri di Montebello”)
- Capt. Nunzio Incannamorte (DC Self-propelled Artillery Group)
- Capt. Vincenzo Pandolfo (1st Regiment “Grenadiers of Sardinia”)
- Sub Lt. Luigi Perna (1st Regiment “Grenadiers of Sardinia”)
- Lt. Raffaele Persichetti (1st Regiment “Grenadiers of Sardinia”)
- Infantryman Vittorio Premoli (57th Regiment “Piave” Infantry)
- Sub Lt. Ettore Rosso (CXXXIV Mixed Engineer Battalion)
- Capt. Camillo Sabatini (8th Regiment “Lancieri di Montebello”)
- Capt. Renato Villoresi (13th Regiment “Grenadiers of Sardinia”)

To which are added 28 Silver Medals, 21 Bronze Medals and 6 Distinguished Service Crosses, all awarded in memoriam.

=== Silver Military Valor Medals to the Flag ===
- 1st Regiment “Grenadiers of Sardinia.”
- 8th Regiment “Lancieri di Montebello.”

=== Bronze Military Valor Medal to the Flag ===
- 2nd Regiment “Grenadiers of Sardinia.”

== See also ==
- Motorized-Armored Army Corps (Italy)
- Italian campaign (World War II)
- Operation Achse
- Operation Avalanche
- Italian resistance movement
- Porta San Paolo

== Bibliography ==
- Kesselring, Albert (2007). Soldato fino all'ultimo giorno [Soldier to the last day] (in Italian). Gorizia: LEG.
- Stato Maggiore Esercito - Ufficio Storico. Le operazioni delle unità italiane nel settembre-ottobre 1943 [The operations of Italian units in September-October 1943] (in Italian). Roma.
- Solinas, Gioacchino. I granatieri di Sardegna nella difesa di Roma [Grenadiers of Sardinia in the defense of Rome] (in Italian). E.F.C.
- Pisanò, Giorgio. Storia della Guerra civile in Italia [History of the Civil War in Italy] (in Italian). CED.
- Cavallero, Ugo (1948). Comando Supremo [Supreme Command] (in Italian). Cappelli.
- Zangrandi, Ruggero (1971). L'Italia tradita. 8 settembre 1943 [Italy Betrayed. September 8, 1943] (in Italian). Mursia.
- Roatta, Mario. Memoria sulla difesa di Roma, relazione all'Ufficio Operazioni dello Stato Maggiore Esercito, Brindisi, 18 gennaio 1944 [Memoir on the defense of Rome, report to the Operations Office of the Army General Staff, Brindisi, Jan. 18, 1944] (in Italian).
- Di Benigno, Jo (1945). Occasioni mancate, Roma in un diario segreto [Missed opportunities, Rome in a secret diary] (in Italian). S.E.I.
- Sanzi, Alfredo (1946). Il generale Carboni e la difesa di Roma visti ad occhio nudo [General Carboni and the defense of Rome as seen with the naked eye] (in Italian). Vogliotti.
- Westphal, Siegfrid (1958). Decisioni fatali [Fatal decisions] (in Italian). Longanesi.
- Dollmann, Eugen (1959). Roma nazista [Nazi Rome] (in Italian). Longanesi.
- Pieri, Piero (1960). Roma nella prima decade del settembre 1943, in "Nuova rivista storica" [Rome in the first decade of September 1943, in “New Historical Magazine”] (in Italian).
- Bertoldi, Silvio (1962). Le guerre parallele [The parallel wars] (in Italian). Sugar.
- Giovannetti, Alberto (1962). Roma città aperta [Rome: open city] (in Italian). Libreria Vaticana.
- D'Assergio, Antonio (1963). Memoria sulla difesa di Roma [Memoir on the defense of Rome] (in Italian). Penne.
- Piscitelli, Enzo (1965). Storia della resistenza romana [History of the Roman resistance] (in Italian). Laterza.
- Castellano, Giuseppe (1967). Roma kaputt (in Italian). Casini.
- Pafi, Benedetto; Bruno Benvenuti (1985). Roma in Guerra [Rome at War] (in Italian). Roma: Edizioni Oberon.
- Majanlahti, Anthony; Guerrazzi, Amedeo Osti (2010). Anthony Majanlahti - Amedeo Osti Guerrazzi, Roma occupata 1943-1944. Itinerari, storia, immagini, Il Saggiatore, Milano, 2001 [Occupied Rome 1943-1944. Itineraries, history, images] (in Italian). Il Saggiatore. ISBN 978-88-428-1626-3.
- Portelli, Alessandro (1999). L'ordine è già stato eseguito. Roma, le Fosse Ardeatine, la memoria [The order has already been carried out. Rome, the Fosse Ardeatine, the memory] (in Italian). Roma: Donzelli Editore. ISBN 978-88-7989-457-9. Riedizione: Milano, Feltrinelli Editore, 2012, ISBN 978-88-07-723421.
- Ranzato, Gabriele (2000). "Roma". In Enzo Collotti, Renato Sandri e Frediano Sessi (ed.). Dizionario della Resistenza [Dictionary of Resistance] (in Italian). Vol. I. Torino: Einaudi. pp. 412–23.
- De Felice, Renzo (1997). Mussolini l'alleato. II. La guerra civile 1943-1945 [Mussolini the ally. II. The Civil War 1943-1945] (in Italian). Torino: Einaudi.
- Simonetti, Fabio (2016). Via Tasso: Quartier generale e carcere tedesco durante l’occupazione di Roma [Via Tasso: German headquarters and prison during the occupation of Rome] (in Italian). Roma: Odradek.
