= Gioacchino Solinas =

Italian general

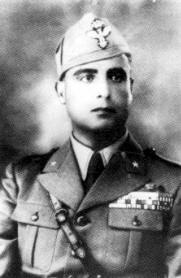
- Born: 1 September 1892; Bonorva, Kingdom of Italy
- Died: 22 April 1987 (aged 94); Sassari, Italy
- Military career
- Allegiance: Kingdom of Italy; Italian Social Republic
- Branch: Royal Italian Army; Italian Social Republic
- Service years: 1912–1945
- Rank: Major General
- Commands: 16th Colonial Brigade; 5th Bersaglieri Regiment; 44th Infantry Division Cremona; 21st Infantry Division Granatieri di Sardegna; 205th Regional Military Command
- Conflicts: World War I; Pacification of Libya; Italian occupation of Ethiopia; World War II; Greco-Italian War; Italian campaign on the Eastern Front; Italian occupation of Corsica; Operation Achse
- Awards: Silver Medal of Military Valor (three times); Bronze Medal of Military Valor; War Cross for Military Valor; War Merit Cross (twice); Order of the Crown of Italy

Gioacchino Solinas (1 September 1892 in Bonorva – 22 April 1987 in Sassari) was an Italian general during World War II. He is best known for his leadership of the Grenadiers of Sardinia during the defense of Rome after the Armistice of Cassibile; he later joined the Italian Social Republic.

== Biography ==
He was born in Bonorva, province of Sassari, on 1 September 1892, and entered the Royal Academy of Infantry and Cavalry of Modena on 8 November 1910, graduating with the rank of infantry second lieutenant. On 19 May 1912 he was assigned to the 2nd Bersaglieri Regiment; during the First World War, with the rank of captain, he distinguished himself at the command of the 8th Company of the 10th Bersaglieri Regiment. Having been wounded in the jaw, after recovering he was transferred to the service of the 2nd Marching Machine Gun Regiment.

At the end of the war he was transferred to the Royal Corps of Colonial Troops of Cyrenaica, participating in the pacification of the colony, during which he was awarded a Silver Medal of Military Valor and a War Cross for Military Valor. At the end of the operations, having been promoted to major, he was transferred to the military garrison of Zara as battalion commander, serving under Giovanni Messe, who praised his qualities. He was later promoted to colonel and transferred to Italian East Africa, where in 1939 he became commander of the 16th Colonial Brigade stationed in Gondar. He further distinguished himself during counter-guerrilla operations in Ethiopia, for which he was awarded a second Silver Medal for military valor.

He returned to Italy before the country entered World War II on 10 June 1940, after which he distinguished himself at the command of the 5th Bersaglieri Regiment of the 131st Armoured Division Centauro on the Greek-Albanian front, where he was promoted to brigadier general on the field. In 1941 he was appointed deputy commander of the 3rd Cavalry Division Principe Amedeo Duca d'Aosta, participating in the fighting on the Eastern Front with the Italian Expeditionary Corps in Russia. He was repatriated on 28 October 1941 due to his debilitated health (he suffered from reiterated malaria attacks, having contracted this illness in Greece, and had developed sciatica due to the hardships of the fighting on the Eastern Front) and was hospitalized in Milan until August 1942, when he recovered and on 21 August was appointed commander of the divisional infantry of the 44th Infantry Division Cremona, stationed in Macomer. On 10 November 1942 he assumed command of the entire division, which on the following day was transferred to Corsica as an occupation force following Operation Anton. After the fall of Fascism, on 25 July 1943, he was recalled to Rome by General Giacomo Carboni, commander of the Motorized-Armored Army Corps, who on 4 August 1943 appointed him commander of the 21st Infantry Division Granatieri di Sardegna.

On the evening of September 8 he learned of the signing of the Armistice of Cassibile, and immediately asked for orders from the higher commands, without receiving any information. He was then informed that the 103rd Infantry Division Piacenza and the 220th Coastal Division, which formed the outer protective belt south of Rome, had been disarmed by German troops, and shortly thereafter a German officer presented himself at his headquarters and demanded the surrender of his division. Solinas rejected the demand, and threatened that if the Germans did not return a checkpoint they had seized by 10 pm, he would ordered to open fire on a Wehrmacht column on the Via Ostiense. The checkpoint was not returned, and after the ultimatum expired the Grenadiers of Sardinia opened fire on the Germans, starting the battle for the defense of Rome. The fighting continued till 4:10 pm on 10 September, when General Giorgio Calvi di Bergolo and Marshal of Italy Enrico Caviglia signed a ceasefire with Field Marshal Albert Kesselring. The division was then dissolved and Solinas, wanted by the Germans for his order to fire on them, was forced to go into hiding.

In spite of this, after the establishment of the Italian Social Republic he was contacted by Marshal of Italy Rodolfo Graziani, Minister of National Defense of the RSI, who offered him the position of military commander of Lombardy (205th Regional Military Command), which he accepted in November 1943. This was a merely administrative assignment, as Solinas was not given command of combat troops. Nonetheless, the government of the Italian Social Republic accused him of collaboration with the National Liberation Committee for having removed "officers animated by Fascist faith" from service in the National Republican Army, and he was eventually dismissed in 1944 at the explicit request of Benito Mussolini.

After the end of the war Solinas was arrested by the partisans of the "Matteotti" Brigades, and on 11 July 1945 he was sentenced by the Extraordinary Court of Assize of Milan to twenty years in prison for collaborationism, for having joined the RSI and accepted the regional command of Lombardy. He defended himself by arguing that in the ten months in which he had held the post he had exonerated from service 30,000 soldiers, permitted the repatriation of 6,500 soldiers interned in Switzerland and covered 3,500 desertions, declaring that "no arrest has ever been ordered by me, no extraordinary court has been summoned, no roundup of partisans has been ordered", in addition to point out that he had been dismissed by the Salò government. He appealed the sentence and in 1946 he was absolved by the Court of Cassation of Rome. He then retired to private life, publishing in 1967 a memoir book about the defense of Rome, and dying in Sassari on April 22, 1987.
