= I Caimani del Bell'orizzonte =

Youth-led Italian resistance group that operated in Rome

The Caimans of the Beautiful Horizon
- I Caimani del Bell'orizzonte
- Active: 1943—1944
- Country: Kingdom of Italy
- Allegiance: Italian Student Revolutionary Association (1943); Partisans of Mount Scalambra (1944)
- Type: Partisan group
- Role: Partisan guerrilla; Sabotaging unit
- Part of: Decentralized leadership
- Engagements: Battle of Porta San Paolo

One of the active groups within the wider Italian resistance movement during World War II, specifically in the Italian Civil War, were "I Caimani del Bell'orizzonte" (English: The Caimans of the Beautiful Horizon), a group of anti-fascists from the Montesacro area, Val Melaina area and the Tufello area and that operated in the surrounding areas. The anti-fascist revolutionary group was part of the Italian Student Revolutionary Association and openly participated in urban warfare against German forces and Italian republican collaborationists. The group had a young demographic between 14 years old and 20 years old, being composed of a significant number of de facto child soldiers.

== History ==
=== Background ===
Following the Armistice of Cassibile, Germany pursued what is known as Operation Achse. Utilising the troops previously stationed in Southern, Central and Northern Italy they pursued the occupation of Italian territory, including the city of Rome. This created resistance to the occupying forces, which affected the entirety of the city of Rome, including the area of Monte Sacro and surrounding quarters.

=== Creation of the group ===
In the autumn of 1943 the Italian Student Revolutionary Association had been created, an anti-fascist association founded specifically to fight the Germans and Italian collaborationists within Rome.

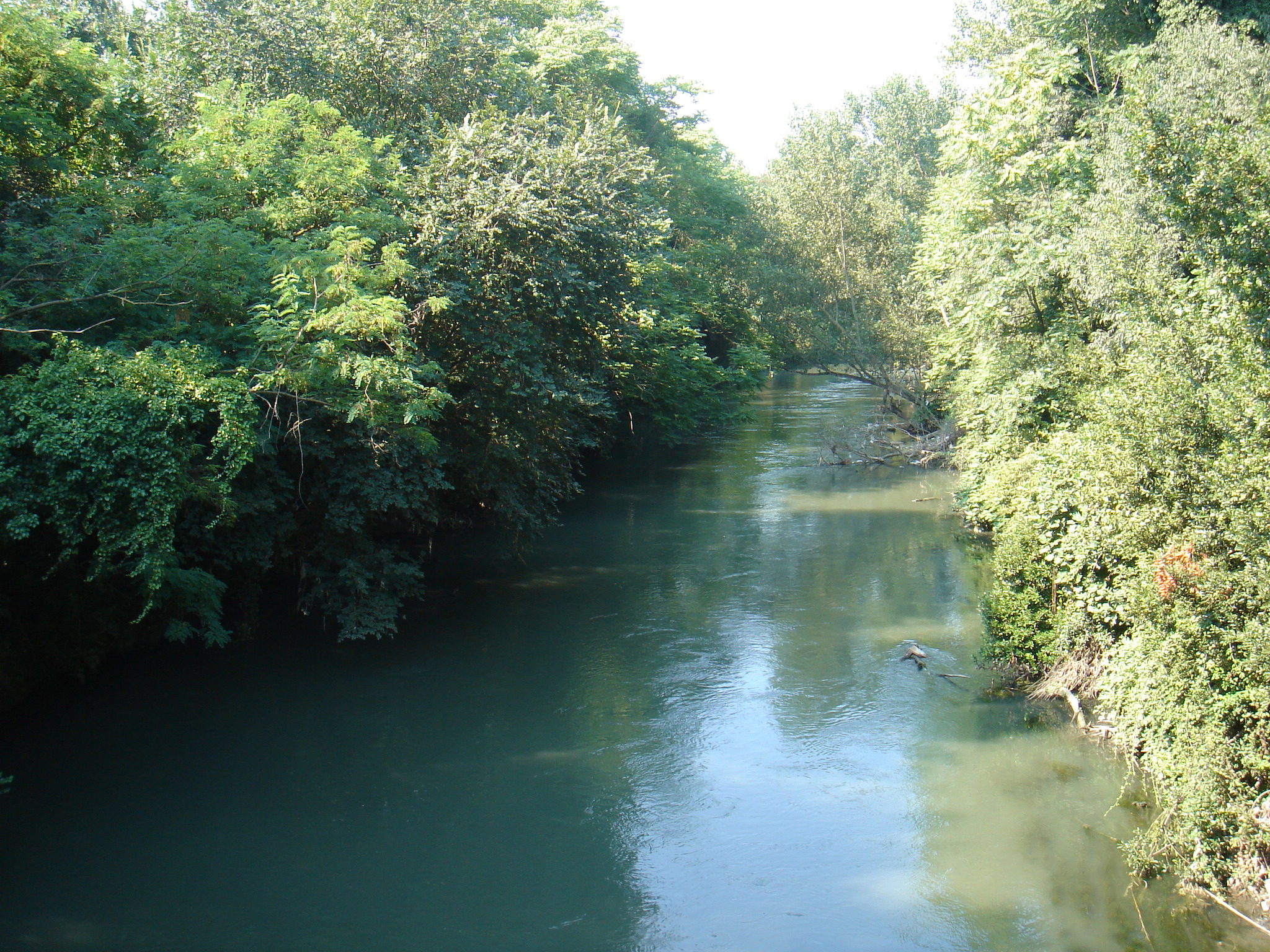
Image of the Aniene river in the approximate area of Porta Nomentana

In the area of Montesacro there was a group of friends from within the quarter and the surrounding ones (Tufello and Val Melania) who used to hang out at the local "Bonelli bar", play football together and swim around in an area of the Aniene adjacent to the Ponte Nomentano. This group had created a swimming team that would was named "I Caimani del Bell'orizzonte", named after the very beach they had swim from. Another thing shared by this group of teenagers was their anti fascistic ideals, and thus, they joined the Italian Student Revolutionary Association as a sub-group operating in their local areas and even outside of it.

The group at the time of the creation of the organized sub-group within the Italian Student Revolutionary Association included students between 13 years old and 20 years old. Known members included: Alvaro Vannucci, Dario Funaro, Giuseppe Gnasso, Corrado Fulli, Mario Belotti, Mario Condigliani and De Anna, most of them from the local Orazio High School.

The youngest member was Dario Funaro, who was only 13 years old at the time of the creation of the sub-group.

=== Operations ===
==== Battle of Porta San Paolo ====
The group participated in the Battle of Porta San Paolo, firing on the Germans massing in the nearby areas.

The group was given two days to get the necessary supplies in order to participate in the battle, and on 10 September 1943 they did so. They used trams which were flipped over as shields and as a position to fire German troops from.

Despite failing in stopping the Germans, the next day, the Caimans gathered along the river, aware of Montesacro's strategic role in resisting the occupation. They began sabotage actions, such as using four-pointed nails to block German convoys.

==== Other actions ====
They pursued sabotaging operations around Rome and also gathered large amounts of ammunition and weaponry in nearby abandoned warehouses and barracks in the proximity of Ponte Nomentano, near their headquarter in Bell'Orizzonte.

The Caimans also participated in propaganda actions, such as dropping leaflets at the Rex cinema during a screening celebrating fascism, risking arrest and death. In January 1944, they participated in the armed boycott of the resumption of university exams, ensuring the safety of student demonstrations.

They found allies in the Democrazia del lavoro and having survived the major raid of February 1944 that decapitated the student revolutionary association (which had already joined different like-minded groups by then), they joined the partisan bands on Mount Scalambra.

In June 1944, they marched toward Rome to participate in the liberation of the city. During the fighting at Ponte Tazio and Piazza Sempione, they confronted retreating German units, helping prevent the bridge's complete destruction. After the liberation, some attempted to enlist in the Liberation Army: Corrado Fulli and De Anna left for the North; others, like Vannucci and Gnasso, were rejected because they were too young. De Anna later died of wounds sustained in combat.

== Legacy ==
A street between Viale Jonio and Via Alberto Savinio was named after the Caimani del Bell'orizzonte in a ceremony in which the students of the Orazio High School participated in 2024. A song named "per una nuova esistenza" ("for a new existence") was composed by singer Trio Monti, and a mural made by the students of the High School, with the help of Manuela Merlo and professor Ugo Claudio Gallici was produced. An awarded movie was also produced, named "Caimani", directed and screened by Andrea Rusich.
