= Giorgio Calvi di Bergolo =

Italian general (1887–1977)

Giorgio Carlo Calvi di Bergolo
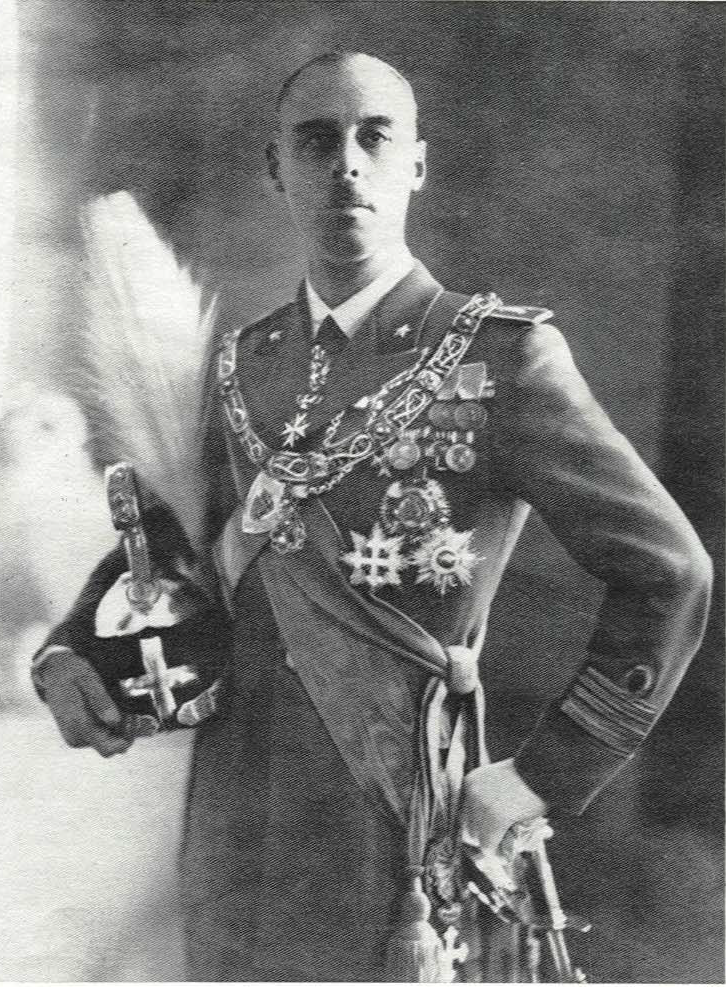
- Born: 15 March 1887; Athens, Greece
- Died: 25 February 1977 (aged 89); Rome, Italy
- Military career
- Allegiance: Kingdom of Italy
- Branch: Royal Italian Army
- Rank: Major general
- Commands: Regiment "Nizza Cavalleria" (1st); Libyan Cavalry Group; 131st Armored Division "Centauro"; 136th Armored Legionary Division "Centauro"; Open City of Rome
- Conflicts: World War I; Battles of the Isonzo; World War II; Western Desert campaign; Tunisian campaign; Battle of Kasserine Pass; Battle of El Guettar
- Awards: Silver Medal of Military Valor; Bronze Medal of Military Valor (three times); War Cross for Military Valor; Order of the Crown of Italy; Iron Cross; Order of Dannebrog

Giorgio Carlo Calvi, Count of Bergolo (Athens, 15 March 1887 – Rome, 25 February 1977) was an Italian general during World War II and the husband of Princess Yolanda of Savoy, the eldest daughter of King Victor Emmanuel III.

== Biography ==
He was born into a family of the Piedmontese nobility, as the eldest son and second child of Giorgio Lorenzo Calvi Conte di Bergolo (1852-1924) and his wife, Baroness Anna Guidobono-Cavalchini-Roero-San Severino (1862-1929). His elder sister, Matilda Emilia Francesca Maria Calvi dei conti di Bergolo (1885-1949) married Prince Aage of Denmark. Giorgio pursued a military career as a cavalry officer and participated in the First World War as a bombardier officer, fighting on the Karst Plateau and earning a Silver Medal of Military Valor, three Bronze medals and War Cross for Military Valor. After the end of the war, he taught horse riding (of which he had been a champion in his youth) at the Royal Cavalry School in Pinerolo.

On 9 July 1923 he married Princess Yolanda of Savoy, eldest daughter of King Victor Emmanuel III, against the wishes of old Queen Mother Margherita, who would have preferred a higher match for her granddaughter (Queen Margherita had hoped to marry her to Edward, Prince of Wales). However, Queen Elena was reportedly supportive of the match, and the King even briefly considered creating him Duke of Montemagno. The marriage was held in the Pauline Chapel; they had five children, Maria Ludovica (born in 1924), Giorgio (born and died in 1925), Vittoria (born in 1927), Guja (born in 1930) and Pier Francesco (born in 1933).

In 1935 he was appointed inspector of cavalry in Libya, and from 1937 to 1940 he commanded the Regiment "Nizza Cavalleria" (1st). In June 1940, after Italy's entry into World War II, he was given command of the Libyan Cavalry Group; he was promoted to brigadier general on 1 October 1940, and in February 1941 he became chief of staff of the liaison office with Panzer Army Africa, a post he held for a year. On 1 March 1942 he replaced General Gavino Pizzolato at the command of the 131st Armored Division "Centauro" (then stationed in Piedmont), which he led during the Tunisian campaign from late 1942 (when he was promoted to major general) to April 1943, earning success at the battle of Kasserine Pass in February 1943; in a later incident he temporarily assumed command of a German battalion who had been left without commander and was awarded the Iron Cross. On 7 April 1943, after the division had suffered heavy casualties in the battle of El Guettar and most of its surviving units had been attached to other Italian and German divisions, Calvi di Bergolo was repatriated.

After the fall of Fascism on 25 July 1943, Calvi di Bergolo was given command of the 136th Armored Legionary Division "Centauro", formerly the 1st CC.NN. Armored Division "M", stationed near Tivoli. This Division was composed of hand-picked fanatical Blackshirts, that had been trained by Waffen-SS instructors and were equipped with German armored vehicles, such as Panzer IIIs, Panzer IVs, and Stug IIIs. Calvi di Bergolo, who replaced MVSN General Alessandro Lusana, was tasked with "defascistizing" the Division, replacing its most fanatical Fascist officers with officers loyal to the Badoglio government. Nevertheless, when on 2 September 1943 he was summoned by General Giacomo Carboni and asked about the reliability of his unit in the event of a change of sides, he replied that it was unlikely that his men would accept it. Disappointed with the response, Carboni decided to prepare for the replacement of Calvi di Bergolo with his deputy, General Oscar Gritti. On 7 September, when the Armistice of Cassibile had already been secretly signed, Carboni again asked the same question to Calvi di Bergolo, who decided to ask his officers directly; they confirmed that they would never take up arms against the Germans. At that point Bergolo was replaced with Gritti.

After the proclamation of the Armistice on 8 September, the start of Operation Achse and the flight of the king and government from Rome, Calvi di Bergolo made contact with the German commander Albert Kesselring, on behalf of Marshal Enrico Caviglia, for the cessation of the fighting that had broken out in and around the capital. These negotiations ended on 10 September 1943, at 16:00, with the signing of the surrender of Rome, whose status as an "open city" was initially recognized by the Germans, who agreed to appoint Calvi di Bergolo as its military commander and to allow the 10th Infantry Division "Piave" to keep its arms, with the task of maintaining public order under the control of the Command of the open city. On 11 September Calvi di Bergolo issued a statement according to which German troops would have to remain outside of the city; on the same day, however, Field Marshal Kesselring declared that Rome was to be considered war zone, was subject to the German code of war, and that "strike organizers, saboteurs and snipers [would be] shot" and that Italian authorities should "prevent any act of sabotage and passive resistance". The deal was soon broken by the Germans, who during the following weeks occupied the entire city and disarmed the Piave, whose men were sent to Germany as Italian military internees. On 23 September, after the establishment of the Italian Social Republic, which he refused to join, Calvi di Bergolo was arrested by the Germans along with police chief Carmine Senise, PAI General Riccardo Maraffa (who had been appointed commander of all police forces of the open city of Rome), General Umberto di Giorgio (former commander of the territorial defence of Rome), General Ugo Tabellini (commander of the Piave) and Count Vittorio Cini, and transferred to northern Italy. He was then imprisoned in a hotel in Hirschegg, Austria, along with some members of the royal family and former Prime Minister Francesco Saverio Nitti, but was later allowed to return to Italy and placed under house arrest in Casale Monferrato, enjoying better treatment than the other arrested generals, apparently due to the respect he had earned from the Germans during his service in North Africa. From there he escaped to Switzerland, where he rejoined his wife and children, who had fled there after the Armistice.

He returned to Italy in May 1945, after the end of the war, and left active service in the Army. In 1946, following the abolition of monarchy in Italy, Calvi di Bergolo and Yolanda followed Victor Emmanuel III and Queen Elena into exile in Egypt. They returned to Italy in 1955; Calvi di Bergolo then led a retired life in a castle in Monferrato and later in a villa in Capocotta. He died in Rome in 1977.
