= 136th Armored Legionary Division "Centauro" =

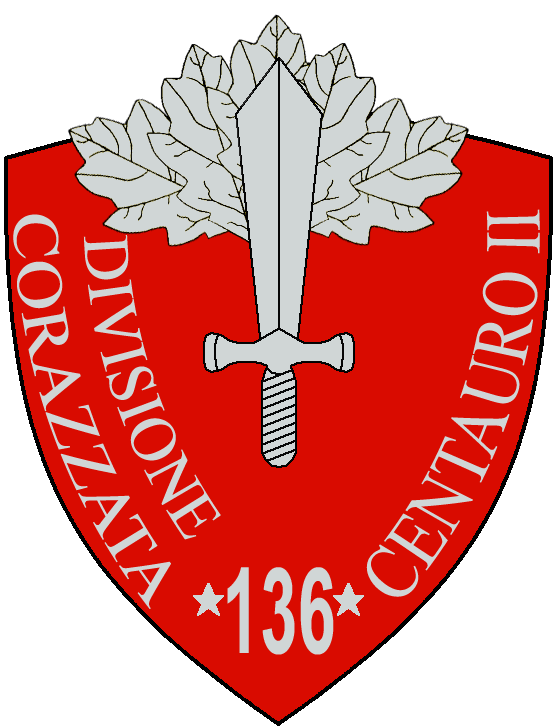
- 136th Armored Legionary Division "Centauro" insignia
- Active: 1943
- Country: Kingdom of Italy
- Branch: Royal Italian Army
- Type: Armored
- Size: Division
- Engagements: World War II

Insignia
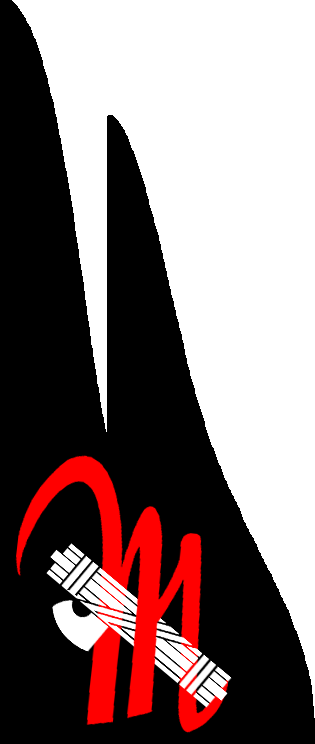
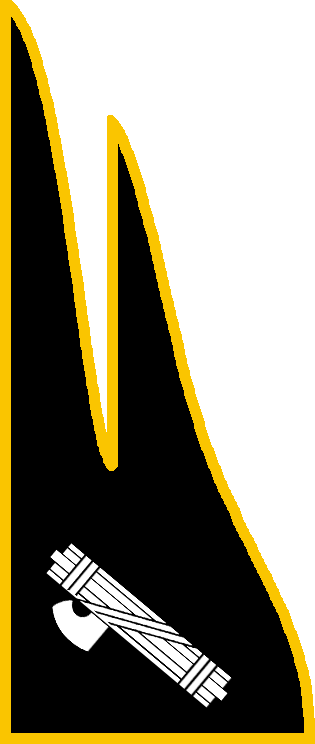
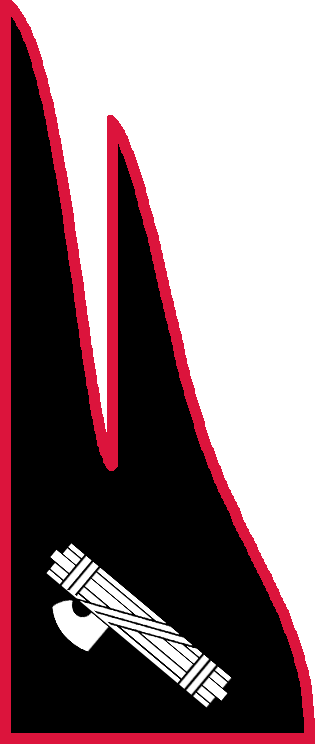
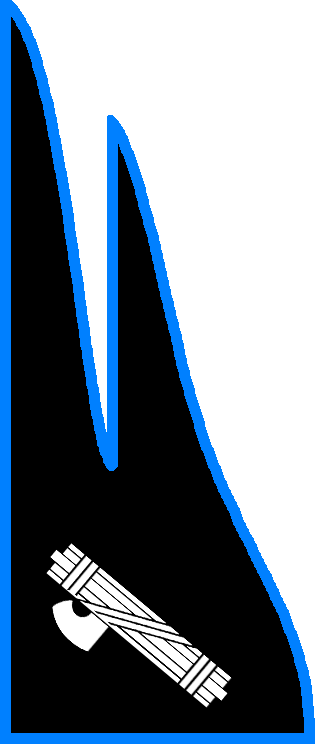
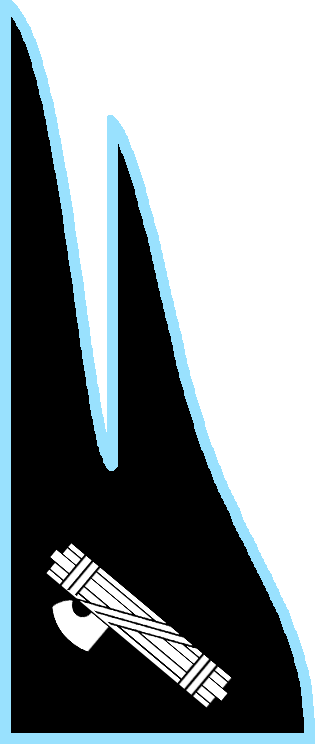
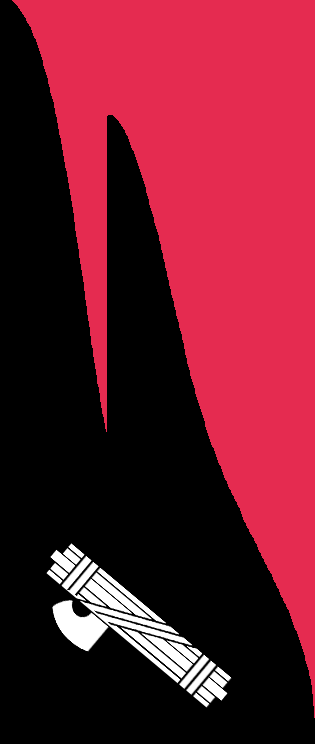
- Identification symbol: 136th Armored Division "M" gorget patches

The 136th Armored Legionary Division "Centauro" (Italian: 136ª Divisione legionaria corazzata "Centauro", colloquially also known as "136th Armored Division "Centauro II") was an armored division of the Royal Italian Army during World War II. The division had been formed in June 1942 as 1st CC.NN. Armored Division "M" (M for Mussolini), but was renamed after the fall of the fascist regime in July 1943. In September 1943 it was in training near Rome and was disbanded by the Germans after the announcement of the Armistice of Cassibile.

== History ==
=== 1st CC.NN. Armored Division "M" ===
The 1st CC.NN. Armored Division "M" (Italian: 1ª Divisione corazzata Camicie Nere "M") was formed after the Hitler-Mussolini summit at Schloss Klessheim in April 1943. The division was intended as Mussolini's personal guard division and therefore composed of hand-picked fanatical Blackshirts, who had already seen combat on the Eastern Front in the Soviet Union. Most of the division's Blackshirts had served with the CC.NN. Grouping "3 Gennaio" in the Italian Army in Russia. For the formation of the division the Germans provided forty Waffen-SS instructors and the heavy equipment. The activation ceremony was held on 25 June 1943 in Chiusi and by August 1943 the division consisted of about 5,700 men. After the fall of Mussolini on 25 July 1943 the division was integrated into the Royal Italian Army on 15 August 1943 and renamed 136th Armored Legionary Division "Centauro", in commemoration of the 131st Armored Division "Centauro", which had distinguished itself and was destroyed during the Tunisian campaign.

=== 136th Armored Legionary Division "Centauro" ===
The 136th Armored Legionary Division "Centauro" (Italian: 136ª Divisione legionaria corazzata "Centauro") entered the Royal Italian Army on 15 August 1943. The division's name was chosen to commemorate the 131st Armored Division "Centauro", which had been destroyed in May 1943 at the end of the Tunisian campaign. On 15 August the division's new commander Giorgio Calvi di Bergolo, the son-in-law of King Victor Emmanuel III, began to purge the division's fascist officers and plans were drawn up to integrate regular army units into the division to dilute its fascist personnel. The units chosen for the latter task were the 18th Bersaglieri Regiment and XIX Tank Battalion M. The division was part of the Motorized-Armored Army Corps, which was tasked to defend Rome against German forces, but after the Armistice of Cassibile was announced on 8 September 1943 the division's, with the exception of the 18th Bersaglieri Regiment remained passive and did not fight the invading German forces. The Germans disbanded the division on 12 September 1943 and used its equipment to replenish the 1st Fallschirm-Panzer Division Hermann Göring.

== Organization ==
=== 1st CC.NN. Armored Division "M" ===
1st CC.NN. Armored Division "M" organization in 1943

- 1st CC.NN. Armored Division "M"
  - Headquarters
    - Command Company
    - 228th Carabinieri Section
    - 306th Field Post Office
  - CC.NN. Battalion Group "M" "Montebello"
    - Command Company
    - VI CC.NN. Assault Battalion "M"
    - XII CC.NN. Support Weapons Battalion "M"
      - 1 × Anti-tank Company (47/32 mod. 35 anti-tank guns), 1 × Mortar Company (81mm mod. 35 mortars)
    - XXX CC.NN. Assault Battalion "M"
  - CC.NN. Battalion Group "M" "Tagliamento"
    - Command Company
    - XLI CC.NN. Support Weapons Battalion "M"
      - 1 × Anti-tank Company 47/32 mod. 35 anti-tank guns), 1 × Mortar Company (81mm mod. 35 mortars)
    - LXIII CC.NN. Assault Battalion "M"
    - LXXIX CC.NN. Assault Battalion "M"
  - CC.NN. Artillery Grouping "M" "Valle Scrivia" (formed on 25 June 1943 by the depot of the 53rd Artillery Regiment "Arezzo" in Chieti)
    - Command Unit
    - I Group (3 × batteries with 4 × 8.8 cm Flak anti-aircraft guns per battery, towed by Sd.Kfz.7)
    - II Group (3 × batteries with 4 × 8.8 cm Flak anti-aircraft guns per battery, towed by Sd.Kfz.7)
  - CC.NN. Tank Group "M" "Leonessa"
    - 1st Tank Company (12 × Panzer IV Ausf. G)
    - 2nd Tank Company (12 × Panzer III Ausf. N)
    - 3rd Self-propelled Company (12 × Sturmgeschütz III Ausf. G)
  - CCV Sapper Battalion (Royal Italian Army)
  - Mixed Engineer Unit (Royal Italian Army)
  - Medical Section (Royal Italian Army)
  - Supply Section (Royal Italian Army)

=== 136th Armored Legionary Division "Centauro" ===
136th Armored Legionary Division "Centauro" organization in 1943

- 136th Armored Legionary Division "Centauro"
  - Headquarters
    - Command Company
    - 228th Carabinieri Section
    - 306th Field Post Office
  - 18th Bersaglieri Regiment (arrived in Rome on 8 September 1943 and joined the division the next day)
    - Command Platoon
    - LXVIII Bersaglieri Battalion
      - 1st Armored Car Company (AB 41 armored cars)
      - 4th Bersaglieri Motorcyclists Company
    - LXIX Bersaglieri Battalion
      - 5th Self-propelled Company (Semovente da 47/32 self-propelled guns)
      - 6th Anti-aircraft Company (20/65 mod. 35 anti-aircraft guns)
  - 131st Tank Infantry Regiment, in Siena (reformed on 1 September 1943; planned to join the division once its became fully operational)
    - Tank Group "Leonessa"
    - XIX Tank Battalion M, in Siena (M15/42 tanks and Semovente da 75/34 self-propelled guns)
  - Motorized Legionary Regiment (remnants of the "Montebello" and "Tagliamento" battalion groups after the purging of fascists)
    - Command Company
    - I Battalion
    - II Battalion
  - 136th Armored Artillery Regiment (remnants of the "Valle Scrivia" grouping after the purging of fascists)
    - Command Unit
    - I Group (3 × batteries with 4 × 8.8 cm Flak anti-aircraft guns per battery and 1 × battery with 8 × 20/65 mod. 35 anti-aircraft guns)
    - II Group (3 × batteries with 4 × 8.8 cm Flak anti-aircraft guns per battery and 1 × battery with 8 × 20/65 mod. 35 anti-aircraft guns)
  - CXXXVI Mixed Engineer Battalion
  - CCV Sapper Battalion
  - Transport Unit
  - Medical Section
  - Supply Section

== Commanding officers ==
The division's commanding officers were:

1st CC.NN. Armored Division "M":

- Console Generale Alessandro Lusana (25 June 1943 - 15 August 1943)

136th Armored Legionary Division "Centauro":

- Generale di Divisione Giorgio Calvi di Bergolo (16 August 1943 - 10 September 1943)
