= Riccardo Maraffa =

Riccardo Marraffa

Chief of the Italian African Police
- In office January 1937 – July 1943
- Preceded by: Office created
- Succeeded by: Quirino Armellini

Personal details
- Born: 20 December 1890 Biljana, Austro-Hungarian Empire
- Died: 11 December 1943 (aged 52) Dachau, Nazi Germany

Military service
- Allegiance: Kingdom of Italy
- Branch/service: Royal Italian Army
- Years of service: 1911–1937
- Rank: Colonel
- Battles/wars: World War I; Second Italo-Ethiopian War

Riccardo Marraffa (20 December 1890 – 11 December 1943) was an Italian soldier and civil servant, founder of the Italian African Police, which he commanded from 1936 to 1943.

== Biography ==
Maraffa was born in Biljana, present-day Slovenia (then part of the Austro-Hungarian Empire), on December 20, 1890, the son of career soldier and oil prospection entrepreneur Cataldo Rocco, from Ceglie Messapica, and Carlotta Giuseppina Gallin, from Udine. He began his military career in the Royal Italian Army with the rank of artillery second lieutenant, on October 16, 1911. He fought in the First World War and after the war, with the rank of Major, he commanded the 10th Siege Artillery Regiment; in 1935, during the Second Italo-Ethiopian War, he was appointed head of the Military Office of the Ministry of Colonies, and later assigned to sections 1st and 3rd of the High Colonial Council. In 1936, after promotion to Colonel, he was assigned to the Royal Academy of Turin, but in January 1937 he left the Army and was given command of the newly established Italian Africa Police (PAI), with the rank of Major General.

The PAI was conceived by Maraffa as an organization with a military organization but with a civilian structure, organized on the model of the British colonial police. The police force was made up of Italian and African personnel, equipped with uniforms, vehicles and weapons of higher quality than those of other Italian law enforcement agencies of the time. He was probably one of the first to study the use of the helicopter for police tasks. In 1943, after the end of the Tunisian campaign and the loss of all Italian colonies in Africa, the personnel of the Italian Africa Police in Italy, made up exclusively of Italian personnel, passed under the control of the Italian police chief Carmine Senise and was placed at the disposal of the Army Corps of Rome, participating in the fighting in defense of the capital against the German troops following the Armistice of Cassibile.

After the German takeover, on 13 September 1943 General Maraffa assumed command of all the police forces of the Open City of Rome, with full powers for the maintenance of public order; he welcomed hundreds of officers and soldiers of the dissolved Royal Italian Army units into his police force, thus preventing their deportation to Germany as Italian Military Internees. After the establishment of the Italian Social Republic, however, he refused to swear loyalty to the new Fascist puppet state and was therefore arrested by the Gestapo and sent to the Dachau concentration camp, where he died less than two months later, on 11 December 1943, after suffering a heart attack.
