= Italian African Police =

Police service of Italian African colonies

Italian African Police Polizia dell'Africa Italiana
- Emblem

Agency overview
- Formed: 1 June 1936
- Dissolved: 12 January 1945

Jurisdictional structure
- National agency (Operations jurisdiction): Italy
- Operations jurisdiction: Italy
- Legal jurisdiction: Italy/Italian East Africa/Italian Libya
- General nature: Gendarmerie

Operational structure
- Headquarters: Rome
- Sworn members: 7,672 officers
- Agency executive: General Riccardo Maraffa General Quirino Armellini, Commandanti (Commandant)
- Parent agency: Ministry of Italian Africa

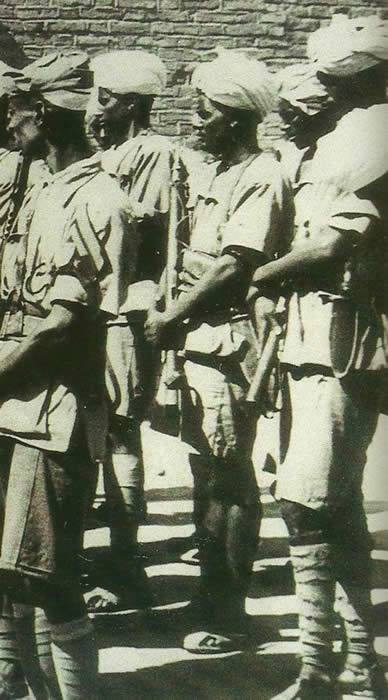
African members of the PAI (Polizia dell'Africa Italiana) in 1938

The Italian African Police (Italian: Polizia dell'Africa Italiana, or PAI), was the provost and police force of Italian North Africa and Italian East Africa from 1 June 1936 to 1 December 1945.

== Characteristics ==
Towards the end of the war in Ethiopia (late 1936 and early 1937), Italy created a corps of Polizia Coloniale ("Colonial Police") for law enforcement in Italian North Africa (Africa Settentrionale Italiana, or ASI; Libya). The corps was created by reorganization of public safety units operating in Libya. By March 1938, it was issuing license plates. The corps was later expanded to operate in Ethiopia and the rest of Italian East Africa (Africa Orientale Italiana; AOI).

In 1939, the corps was renamed Polizia dell'Africa Italiana ("Police of Italian Africa"; PAI). At this time, the corps was supplied with motor vehicles (including armored cars, light tanks, motorcycles, motor-tricycles, and automobiles). The PAI received about 1,000 vehicles and as many motorcycles.

The new corps was initially subordinated to the Ministry of the Colonies and, then, to the "Ministry of Italian Africa" (then held by Alessandro Lessona). Its first commander, from 1937 to 1943, was General Riccardo Maraffa, replaced for a brief period in 1943 by General Quirino Armellini.

The PAI had a reputation for discipline, high training standards, and being well-equipped. Even after the collapse of AOI, the PAI were able to keep the peace in Addis Ababa, the capital of Ethiopia.

During World War II, the Italian colonies in Africa were conquered by the Allies; PAI in the colonies were captured. Some PAI were stationed in Italy, for training and administrative functions.

In September 1943, Italy surrendered to the Allies, but German forces occupied northern and central Italy, and established a puppet government, the Repubblica Sociale Italiana (Italian Social Republic; RSI). The RSI then moved the remnant PAI to the city of Rome, where they helped enforce RSI control and maintain public order.

On 4 June 1944, Rome was liberated by the Allies. The PAI was disbanded and its equipment was given to the regular State Police (Polizia di Stato).

== Origin ==
The Royal Decree of 10 June 1937, n. 1211, established its organic regulations, for which it was a militarily organized civil body and making it part of the Italian Armed Forces, with functions of political, judicial and administrative police.

== Organization ==
The force was a racially mixed organization, made up of Italian agents and many native askaris. It was located in police headquarters of major cities like Tripoli, Benghazi, Asmara, Addis Ababa, Mogadishu, Gondar, or in small commissariats otherwhere.

The PAI training school was in Tivoli.

Part of the PAI personnel was mounted on Moto Guzzi motorcycles, with many armed with the Beretta M1938A 9mm sub-machine gun.

== Strength ==
At the outbreak of World War II the PAI had 7,672 men, of which 6,345 were in AOI (Eritrea, Ethiopia and Italian Somalia) and 1,327 were in ASI (Italian Libya). The bulk of the force consisted of indigenous personnel who were trained and equipped to the same standard as Italian personnel. There were 5,146 indigenous personnel, 4,414 from AOI and 732 from ASI.

== World War II ==
The PAI fought during World War II in the Italian colonies and in Italy.

=== Africa ===
During World War II, the PAI fought as a combat unit alongside the Royal Italian Army. For the garrison of the Libyan littoral way, at the outbreak of the conflict two companies on motorcycles and an armored car were assigned to the Exploring Unit of the CAM (Corpo armato di manovra) Battalion "Romolo Gessi". They had little fortune since, after a sudden enemy attack, numerous soldiers were hit by friendly fire from German aircraft. The battalion repaired in Tripolitania and was converted into a mixed company. Several units participated in war actions, at Tripoli, Benghazi, Barce, but the details regarding effective employment are insufficient.

=== Defense of Italy ===
After the Armistice of Cassibile, the evening of 8 September 1943 the PAI participated to the defense of Rome engaging the first conflict with the Germans at Mezzocammino, near Castelfusano, with troops of Carabinieri, in aid to a garrison of Grenadiers of Sardinia. On the other side of Rome, at the same time, some troops protected the escape of the King Victor Emmanuel III along the Via Tiburtina, the King and the Prime Minister Pietro Badoglio; once accomplished the task, they were sent along the Via Laurentina. On 9 September the PAIRS, with the Bersaglieri and cadet police officers, forced for a while the Germans to retreat from the Magliana area; however, after some hours, they had in turn to withdraw in direction of Fort Ostiense, which was later stormed by the Germans.

The commander and founder of the PAI, General Marraffa, was captured by the Nazis and deported to the Dachau concentration camp, where he died.

=== Salò Republic ===
Later, there was a reorganization attempt in northern Italy, with the opening of a PAI school at Busto Arsizio in the autumn of 1943. However, the troops were absorbed by the Republican Police Corps of the Italian Social Republic, and finally by the National Republican Guard.

== Ranks ==
Ranks were as for the Royal Italian Army with enlisted rank being the older style larger pattern of red chevrons worn on both upper sleeves.

PAI Rank

- Allievo guardia
- Guardia di Polizia
- Guardia scelta
- Vice brigadiere
- Brigadiere
- Aspirante ispettore
- Ispettore aggiunto
- Ispettore
- Primo ispettore
- Ispettore capo
- Vice questore
- Questore
- Ispettore generale
- Capo della polizia dell'Al

Italian Army Rank

- Soldato
- Caporale
- Caporale maggiore
- Sergente
- Sergente maggiore
- Aspirante
- Sottotenente
- Tenente
- Capitano
- Maggiore
- Tenente Colonnello
- Colonnello
- Generale di Brigata
- Generale di Divisione

== Uniform ==
Personnel wore the standard Italian khaki tropical uniform but with a blue aiguillette fixed from the right shoulder strap to the second button down the front of his tunic. Personnel also wore a small gold PAI badge on the front of their headgear and small brass fasces pinned directly to their collars.

Motorcycle mounted personnel wore a brown leather crash helmet, light khaki breeches with brown leather boots and leather leggings to protect the lower legs.

== See also ==
- Carabinieri
- Zaptie
- Dubats
- Law enforcement in Italy
- Polizia
- East African campaign (World War II)
