= Motorized-Armored Army Corps (Italy) =

The Motorized-Armored Army Corps (Italian: Corpo d'Armata Motocorazzato) was a Royal Italian Army army corps established on 25 July 1943 led by general Giacomo Carboni.

== History ==
The corps was established after the deposition of Benito Mussolini and was formed with the most efficient divisions of the Royal Italian Army. Its mission was to defend Rome from Allied invasion, but after the signing of the Armistice of Cassibile in September 1943 its new task was to defend Rome from the Germans. After the Badoglio Proclamation, units of the corps fought against German units, but due to the lack of orders from the highest political and military authorities, the corps disbanded in the days following 11 September 1943.

== Units ==
- 10th Infantry Division "Piave"
- 21st Infantry Division "Granatieri di Sardegna"
- 135th Armored Cavalry Division "Ariete"
- 136th Armored Legionary Division "Centauro"

=== Other units ===
- 18th Bersaglieri Regiment, from 9 September 1943 part of Centauro II division
- 1st Fast Artillery Regiment
- 1st Anti-aircraft Artillery Grouping
- 11th Army Corps Engineer Grouping
