= 21st Infantry Division "Granatieri di Sardegna" =

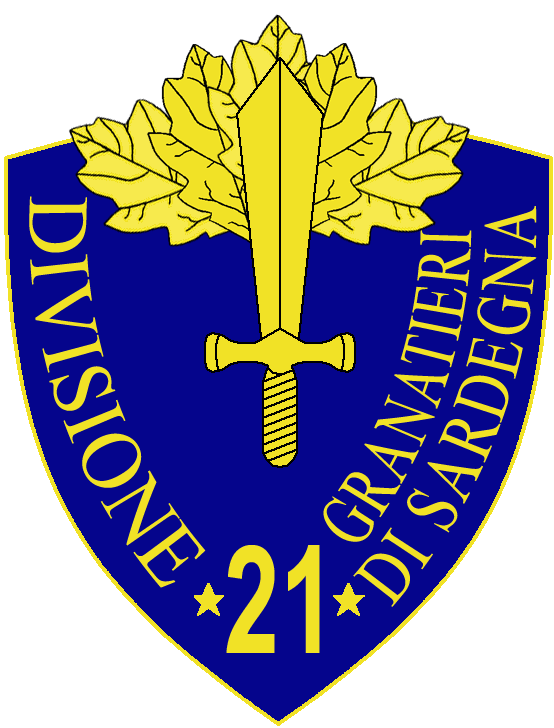
- 21st Infantry Division "Granatieri di Sardegna" insignia
- Active: 1939–1943
- Country: Kingdom of Italy
- Branch: Royal Italian Army
- Type: Infantry
- Size: Division
- Engagements: World War II German occupation of Rome

Commanders
- Notable commanders: General Alfredo Guzzoni; General Gioacchino Solinas

Insignia
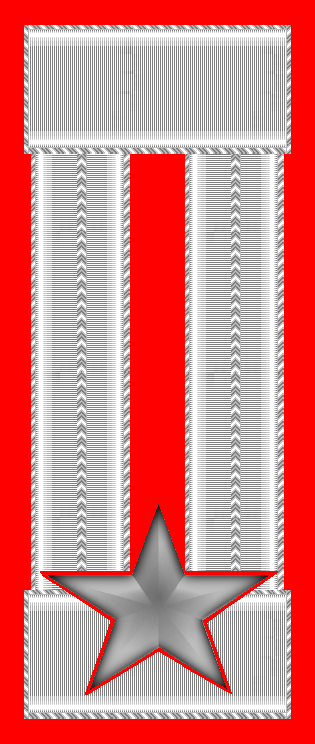
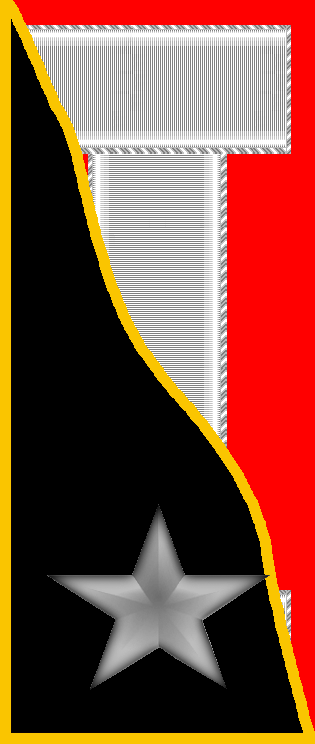
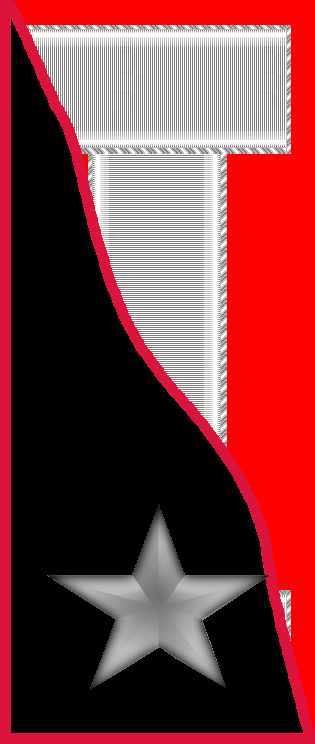
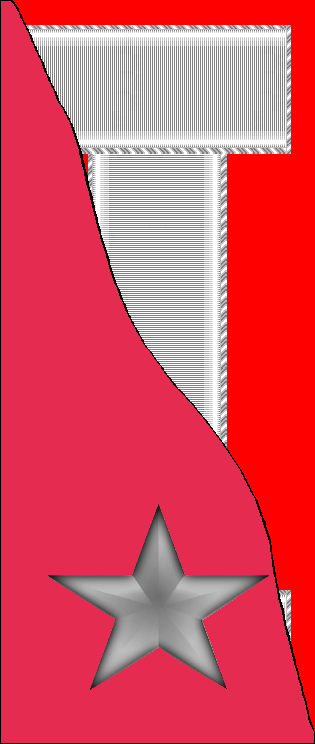
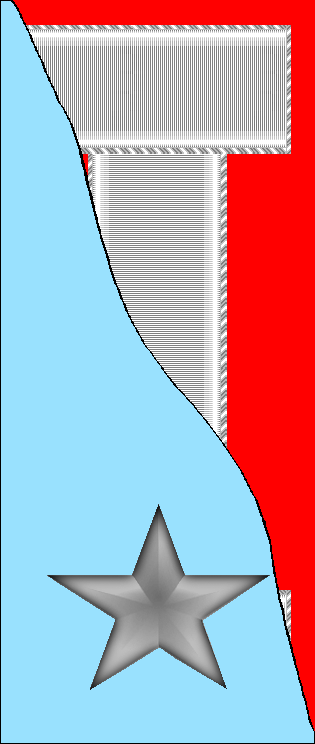
- Identification symbol: Granatieri di Sardegna gorget patches

The 21st Infantry Division "Granatieri di Sardegna" (Italian: 21ª Divisione di fanteria "Granatieri di Sardegna") was an infantry division of the Royal Italian Army during World War II. The division's name translates as "Grenadiers of Sardinia", referring to the Kingdom of Sardinia ruled by the Italian Royal House of Savoy before the unification of Italy as Kingdom of Italy.

== History ==
The division's lineage begins with the royal guard Brigade "Guardie" established on 1 November 1815. On 20 January 1816 the brigade absorbed all grenadier units of the Royal Sardinian Army and was renamed Brigade "Granatieri Guardie". At the time the brigade consisted of four grenadier battalions. In 1831 the infantry brigades of the Royal Sardinian Army were split and formed each two infantry regiments, except for the Brigade "Granatieri Guardie", which did instead added the Regiment "Cacciatori Guardie" with its two Cacciatori battalions.

The brigade's new structure was:

- Brigade "Guardie"
  - 1st Grenadier Regiment
    - 4x Grenadier battalions
  - 2nd Cacciatori Regiment
    - 2x Cacciatori battalions

On 22 March 1848 the brigade was reorganized into two grenadier regiments, the first being formed by the 1st Grenadier Regiment, with the I and III battalions of the 1st Grenadier Regiment and the I battalion of the 2nd Cacciatori Regiment; and the second being formed by the 2nd Cacciatori Regiment, with the II and IV battalions of the 1st Grenadier Regiment and the II battalion of the 2nd Cacciatori Regiment. On 14 October of the same year the two Cacciatori battalions were again assigned to a newly raised Cacciatori Regiment, which on 20 April 1850 became an autonomous unit with the name Regiment "Cacciatori di Sardegna". On the same date the brigade changed its name to Brigade "Granatieri".

The Regiment "Cacciatori di Sardegna" was disbanded on 19 March 1852 and its two battalions returned to the two regiments of the Brigade "Granatieri", which on the same day changed its name to Brigade "Granatieri di Sardegna".

=== World War I ===
The brigade fought on the Italian front in World War I. On 1 December 1926 the brigade assumed the name XXI Infantry Brigade and raised the 3rd Regiment "Granatieri di Sardegna" in Viterbo. The newly formed regiment was given the traditions of the Regiment "Cacciatori di Sardegna". The brigade was the infantry component of the 21st Territorial Division of Rome, which also included the 13th Field Artillery Regiment. On 8 February 1934 the division changed its name to Infantry Division "Granatieri di Sardegna". On 7 April 1939 the I and III battalion of the 3rd Regiment "Granatieri di Sardegna" were airlifted to the Albanian capital Tirana as spearhead of the Italian invasion of Albania. In fall 1939 the 3rd Regiment "Granatieri di Sardegna" left the division and permanently moved to Tirana, where it assumed the name 3rd Regiment "Granatieri di Sardegna e d'Albania". At the same time the XXI Infantry Brigade was dissolved and the grenadier regiments came under direct command of the division, which changed its named to 21st Infantry Division "Granatieri di Sardegna".

=== World War II ===
In June 1940 during the invasion of France the division was as at Asti as reserve of the 7th Army, but due to the quick conclusion of the Battle of France the division was not involved in any operations.

==== Yugoslavia ====
On 8 May 1941 the Granatieri di Sardegna was transferred to the Province of Ljubljana in Yugoslavia and participated in 1942 in encircling Ljubljana with barbed wire as an anti-partisan measure. It was also stationed at Kočevje.

In September 1942 the division moved to Croatia and in the second half of November 1942 it moved back to Rome to defend the city in case of an Allied attack. During this time the division was reformed as a Type 43 Infantry Division, which included the addition of an additional air-defense capabilities, and more modern field guns.

==== Defense of Rome ====
After the announcement of the Armistice of Cassibile on 8 September 1943 the division was tasked to defend Rome from Italy's former allies the Germans. Together with the 12th Infantry Division "Sassari" and 135th Armored Cavalry Division "Ariete", the Carabinieri Legion "Rome", and other minor units the Granatieri di Sardegna fought the German 2nd Fallschirmjäger Division during Operation Achse. The Granatieri deployed initially along the Via Ostiensis, before falling back to Porta San Paolo at the outskirts of Rome on 10 September 1943. At Porta San Paolo the division was joined by remnants of the Sassari division, the cavalry Regiment "Lancieri di Montebello" and hundreds of civilian volunteers. The future Italian president Sandro Pertini brought a detachment of Socialist resistance fighters to Porta San Paolo, where they received the weapons of fallen grenadiers. Civilians at Porta San Paolo included communist leader Luigi Longo, lawyer Giuliano Vassalli, writer Emilio Lussu, unionist leaders Vincenzo Baldazzi, Mario Zagari, retired Air Force generals Sabato Martelli Castaldi and Roberto Lordi, and 18-year-old future partisan leader Marisa Musu. Around 12:30 the Catholic Communist movement arrived with reinforcements including famed actor Carlo Ninchi. However, by 17:00 the Germans broke the line of the Italian defenders, who had suffered 570 dead. Soon after the Italian military units surrendered to the Germans as the flight of the Italian King Victor Emmanuel III from Rome made further resistance senseless. Before surrendering the Italian soldiers handed thousands of their weapons over to the civilian population, which was quick to form an organized resistance movement in the city.

For their role in the defence of the Rome the 1st Granatieri di Sardegna Regiment and the Regiment "Lancieri di Montebello" (8th) were both awarded a Silver Medal of Military Valor, while the 2nd Regiment "Granatieri di Sardegna" and the 13th Artillery Regiment "Granatieri di Sardegna" were both awarded a Bronze Medal of Military Valor.

==== Grouping "Granatieri di Sardegna" ====
At the same time the autonomous Grouping "Granatieri di Sardegna" with three grenadier battalions in Corsica refused German demands to surrender and together with the 20th Infantry Division "Friuli", 44th Infantry Division "Cremona", 225th Coastal Division, 226th Coastal Division and French Partisans began to fight the Germans. The German Sturmbrigade Reichsführer SS and 90th Panzergrenadier Division and the Italian XII Battalion of the 184th Infantry Regiment "Nembo" of 184th Infantry Division "Nembo", which had come from Sardinia tried to retreat through Corsica towards the harbor of Bastia in the islands north. On 13 September elements of the Free French 4th Moroccan Mountain Division landed in Ajaccio to support the Italian efforts to stop the 30,000 retreating Germans. However the Germans managed to escape.

In spring 1944 the Grouping "Granatieri di Sardegna" was transferred to Sardinia and augmented with fresh recruits allowing the Italian Co-belligerent Army to raise the "Granatieri di Sardegna" division anew as Granatieri Division on 15 May 1944. The division consisted of the 1st and 2nd Granatieri regiments, the 32nd Tank Infantry Regiment and 132nd Tank Infantry Regiment, 548th and 553rd Artillery Regiments and the 205th Mixed Engineer Company. However it was decided that the infantry units of the division should join the Combat Group "Friuli" on the frontline in Italy. On 31 August the Granatieri division was disbanded with the remaining units used to augment the Combat Group "Cremona".

=== Cold War ===
After World War II the division was raised again on 1 April 1948 with the 1st Regiment "Granatieri di Sardegna", 17th Infantry Regiment "Acqui" and 13th Field Artillery Regiment. On 1 November 1976 the division was reduced to Mechanized Brigade "Granatieri di Sardegna".

== Organization ==
21st Infantry Division "Granatieri di Sardegna" organization in 1940

- 21st Infantry Division "Granatieri di Sardegna", in Rome
  - Headquarters
    - Command Company
    - 61st Carabinieri Section
    - 62nd Carabinieri Section
    - 81st Field Post Office
    - 21st Infantry Division Command Transport Squad
  - 1st Regiment "Granatieri di Sardegna", in Rome
    - Command Company
    - 3 × Grenadier battalions
    - Support Weapons Battery (65/17 mod. 13 infantry support guns)
    - Mortar Company (81mm mod. 35 mortars)
  - 2nd Regiment "Granatieri di Sardegna", in Rome
    - Command Company
    - 3 × Grenadier battalions
    - Support Weapons Battery (65/17 mod. 13 infantry support guns)
    - Mortar Company (81mm mod. 35 mortars)
  - 13th Artillery Regiment "Granatieri di Sardegna", in Rome
    - Command Unit
    - I Group (100/17 mod. 14 howitzers)
    - II Group (75/27 mod. 11 field guns)
    - III Group (75/13 mod. 15 mountain guns; transferred in December 1940 to the 30th Artillery Regiment "Lupi di Toscana")
    - III Group (75/27 mod. 11 field guns; transferred in December 1940 from the 30th Artillery Regiment "Lupi di Toscana")
    - IV Group (100/17 mod. 14 howitzers; formed in 1941)
    - 10th Anti-aircraft Battery (20/65 mod. 35 anti-aircraft guns)
    - 609th Anti-aircraft Battery (20/65 mod. 35 anti-aircraft guns, joined the division in 1943)
    - 612th Anti-aircraft Battery (20/65 mod. 35 anti-aircraft guns, joined the division in 1943)
    - Ammunition and Supply Unit
  - XXI Mortar Battalion (81mm mod. 35 mortars)
  - XXI Mixed Engineer Battalion (formed in 1943)
  - 21st Anti-tank Company (47/32 mod. 35 anti-tank guns, replaced by the 221st Anti-tank Company in 1943)
  - 21st Telegraph and Radio Operators Company (entered the XXI Mixed Engineer Battalion in 1943)
  - 54th Engineer Company (entered the XXI Mixed Engineer Battalion in 1943)
  - 1st Medical Section
    - 56th Field Hospital
    - 85th Field Hospital
    - 88th Field Hospital
    - Surgical Unit
  - 15th Supply Section
  - 21st Autocarrette Section
  - 1 × Transport Section

Attached from December 1940 until 31 January 1941:

- 112th CC.NN. Legion "Dell’Urbe"
  - CXII CC.NN. Battalion
  - CXX CC.NN. Battalion
  - CXII CC.NN. Replacements Battalion
  - 112th CC.NN. Machine Gun Company

Attached from 31 January 1941:

- 55th CC.NN. Legion "Alpina Friulana"
  - LV CC.NN. Battalion
  - LXXX CC.NN. Battalion
  - 55th CC.NN. Machine Gun Company

== Commanding officers ==
The division's commanding officers were:

- Generale di Brigata Umberto Spigo (14 March 1939 - 29 February 1940)
- Generale di Divisione Taddeo Orlando (1 March 1940 - 5 November 1942)
- Generale di Brigata Adolfo De Rienzi (acting, 6-12 November 1942)
- Generale di Divisione Giunio Ruggiero (13 November 1942 - 3 August 1943)
- Generale di Divisione Gioacchino Solinas (4 August 1943 - 10 September 1943)

== CROWCASS ==
The names of four men attached to the division can be found in the Central Registry of War Criminals and Security Suspects (CROWCASS) set up by the Anglo-American Supreme Headquarters Allied Expeditionary Force in 1945. The names can be found at: Central Registry of War Criminals and Security Suspects from the Kingdom of Italy.

== See also ==
- Granatieri di Sardegna Mechanized Brigade
- Military history of Italy during World War II
- Regio Esercito
