= General Law =

General Law may refer to:

- Evander M. Law (1836–1920), Confederate States Army brigadier general and (according to some reports) major general
- Robert Law (British Army officer) (c. 1788–1874), British Army lieutenant general

== See also ==
- Attorney General Law (disambiguation)
- General-law municipality
- General Laws of Massachusetts
