= Teatro Fraschini =

Teatro

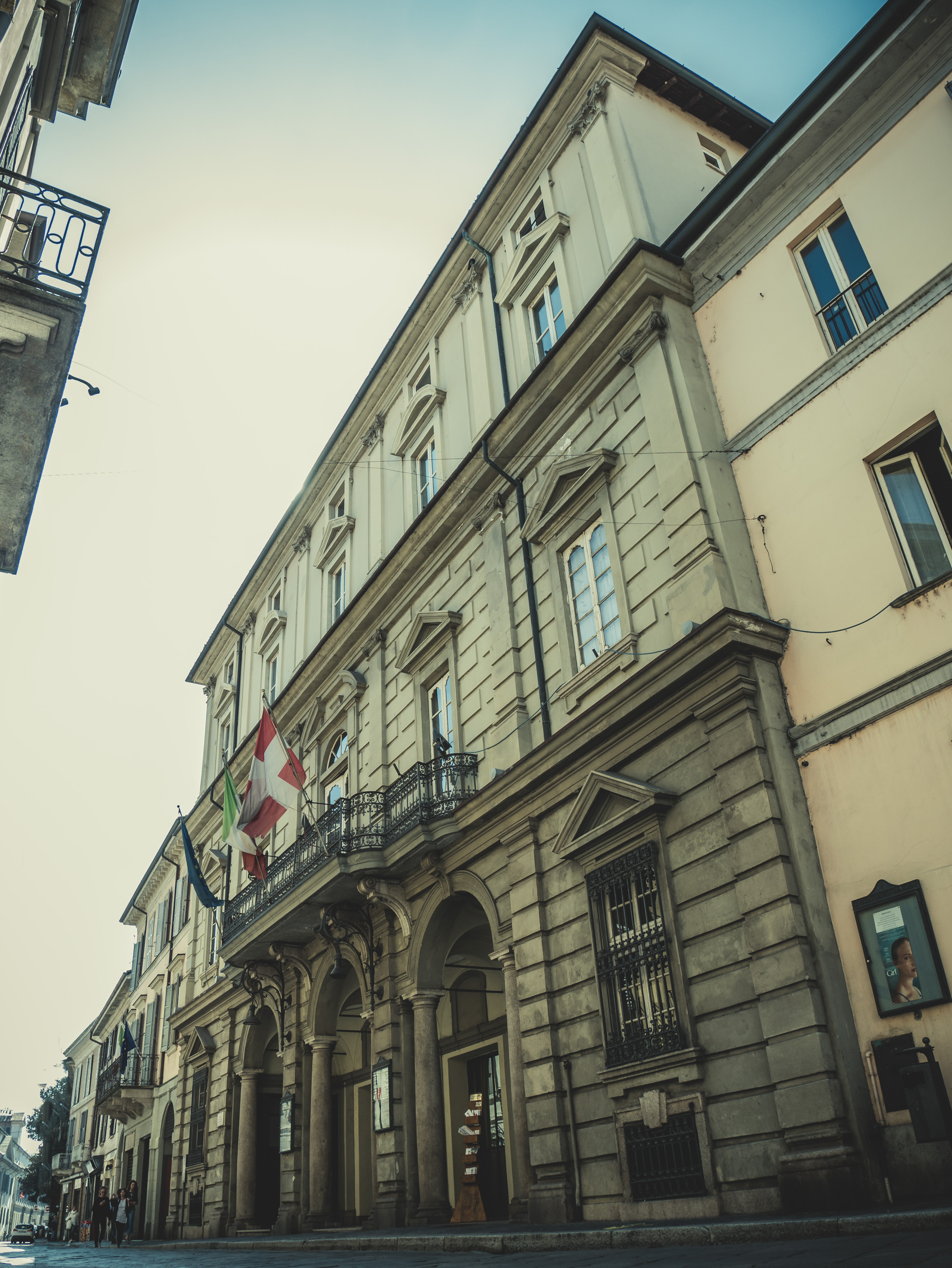
- The façade
- Interactive map of Teatro Fraschini
- Address: Pavia, Corso Strada Nuova, 138; Italy
- Coordinates: 45°11′18.76″N 9°9′20.92″E
- Owner: City of Pavia

Construction
- Opened: 1773
- Architect: Antonio Galli da Bibbiena

Website
- www.teatrofraschini.it

The Teatro Fraschini is an opera house in Pavia, Italy. It was inaugurated in 1773 and is considered one of the most important historic theatres in Lombardy. The theatre is renowned for its horseshoe-shaped auditorium and rich Baroque interior.

== History ==
The Theater of the Four Noble Knights – the original name of Fraschini – was designed to counter the whims of the noble Giacomo Omodei, an aristocrat from Pavia and owner of one of the most popular theaters in the city around the middle of the 18th century. In fact, it seems that Giacomo Omodei forced the public, and the other aristocrats, to wait for the start of the shows until his arrival.

In 1772 four noble Pavesi lords joined to form the Society of Knights: Count Francesco Gambarana Beccaria, Marquis Pio Bellisomi, Marquis Luigi Bellingeri Provera and Count Giuseppe Giorgi of Vistarino. They shared the administration and direction of the theater and had entrusted the project for its realization to Antonio Galli da Bibbiena, representative of an ancient and prestigious family of scenographers-architects. The works for the construction of the Theater of the Four Noble Knights began in 1771 and the theater inaugurated its first season in 1773, in the presence of Archduke Ferdinand Karl of Austria-Este. The theater was inaugurated on May 24, 1773, with the opera Il Demetrio, composed by the Czech composer Josef Mysliveček on verses by Pietro Metastasio.

In 1869, the Municipality of Pavia acquired the ownership of the theater, which was soon to be renamed Teatro Fraschini, in honor of the Pavese tenor Gaetano Fraschini.

== Architecture ==
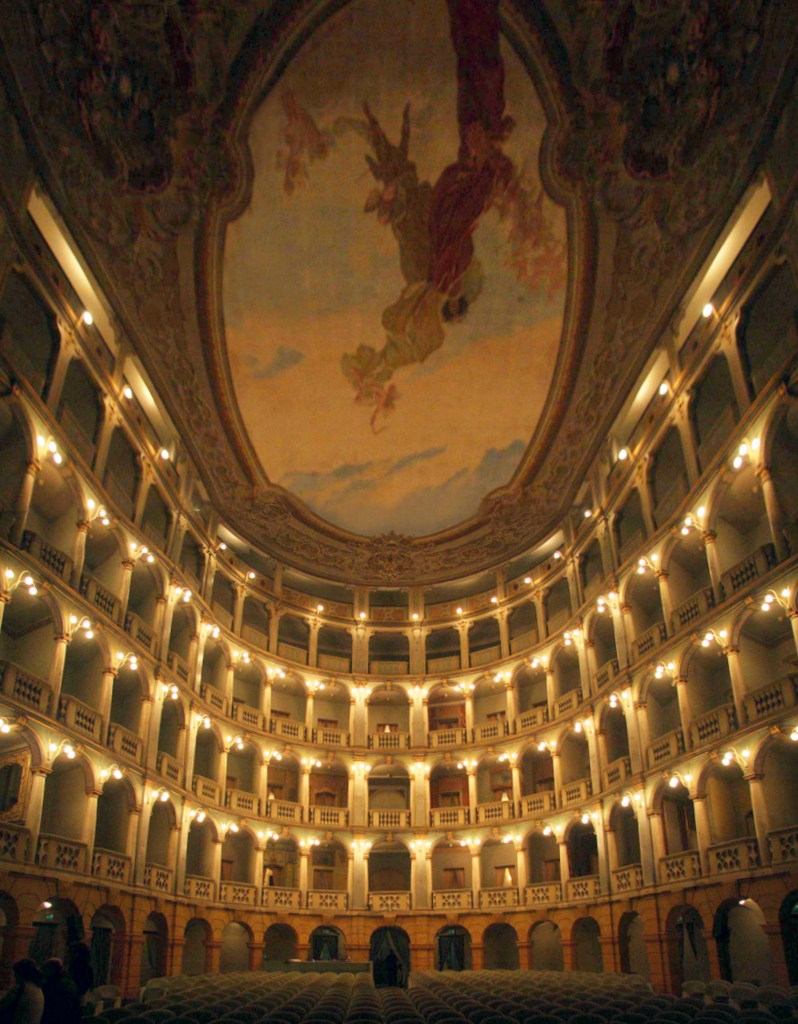
The interior

The Fraschini is an Italian theater; the great hall of the theater is almost in the shape of a horseshoe and seats 409, according to the prevailing taste in the 18th century; it is the artistic example of the perspective research of the Baroque. The floor plan of the hall is bell-shaped with a sound box (optimal solution for acoustics) obtained from an impracticable gallery under the stalls. Above a Tuscan-type bossaged arcade, there are three tiers of boxes (with Doric, Ionic Corinthian composite and Attic capitals) and in addition two upper tiers (the fourth order is a tribune and the fifth is “loggione” and two galleries). The large ceiling fresco was remade in 1909 by Osvaldo Bignami. The two large statues on either side of the proscenium, the work of Michele Forabosco, represent respectively Music and Poetry. On the second level there is an oven still clearly visible and preserved (the theatrical life of the nobles crossed the limit of attending the shows, and extended to entertainment with dinners and board games in the boxes of the property and in the sitting rooms of the backstage). Each stage has a dressing room and most of them retain stuccos and frescoes from the 18th century, different from each other according to the personal taste of the original owners. In fact, since the foundation, the boxes were sold to private individuals who were required to furnish with tapestries, furniture, frescoes, stuccos, doors and curtains, as long as they did not break the overall appearance and architecture of the hall. The façade, which opens onto Strada Nuova, has a porticoed atrium open into three porticoes and two upper floors marked horizontally by Doric, Ionic and Corinthian cornices, between which windows with a tympanum hat open.

Although already a few decades after its inauguration it was considered grand, but far from the neoclassical style, now dominant, the theater has remained miraculously intact in the original structure.

== Bibliography ==
- I Galli Bibiena: una dinastia di architetti e scenografi: atti del convegno, Bibbiena, 26-27 maggio 1995, a cura di Deanna Lenzi, Wanda Bergamini, Bibbiena, Accademia Galli Bibbiena, 1997.
- Giovanni Zaffignani, Un teatro per la città: riflessioni sulle origini, gestione privata e comunale del Fraschini – Il fondo teatrale e musicale presso l’Archivio Storico di Pavia, in “Bollettino della Società Pavese di Storia Patria”, XCV (1996).
- Luisa Erba, Il neoclassicismo a Pavia dal 1770 al 1792, in Banca Regionale Europea (a cura di), Storia di Pavia. L'età spagnola e austriaca, IV (tomo II), Milano, Industrie Grafiche P. M., 1995.
