= Mantegazza =

Mantegazza is an Italian surname. Notable people with the surname include:

- Cristoforo Mantegazza (c.1430–1482), Italian sculptor
- Giacomo Mantegazza (1851–1920), Italian painter
- Laura Solera Mantegazza (1813–1873), Italian patriot, philanthropist and fundraiser
- Paolo Mantegazza (1831–1910), Italian neurologist, physiologist, and anthropologist
- Sergio Mantegazza (1927–2024), Swiss businessman, chairman and owner of Globus
- Virgilio Mantegazza (1889–1928), Italian fencer
- Walter Mantegazza (1952–2006), Uruguayan footballer
