= The Battle of the Chernaya =

1857 painting by Gerolamo Induno

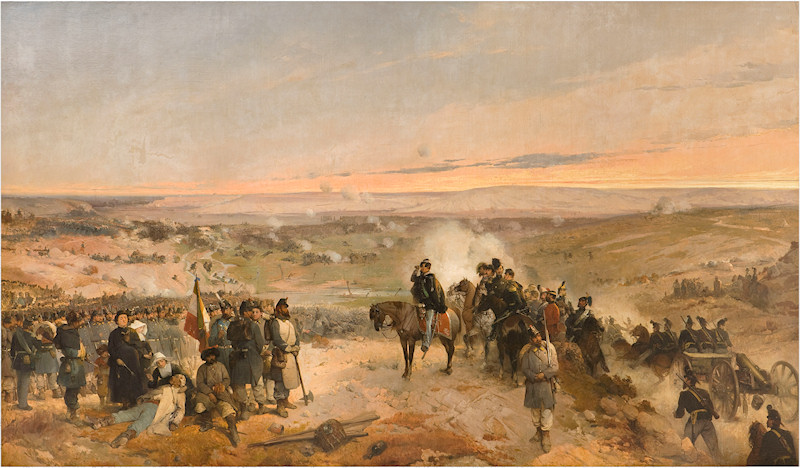
- Artist: Gerolamo Induno
- Year: 1857
- Medium: Oil on canvas
- Dimensions: 292 cm × 494 cm (115 in × 194 in)
- Location: Gallerie di Piazza Scala, Milan

The Battle of the Chernaya (Italian: La battaglia della Cernaia) is an 1857 history painting by the Italian artist Gerolamo Induno. It depicts the Battle of the Chernaya fought on 16 August 1855 during the Crimean War. The action was the last major attempt to break the Allied Siege of Sevastopol by the Russian Army. The Russian strategy to rapidly overwhelm the French positions was thwarted by fierce opposition from Bersaglieri from Kingdom of Sardinia, allowing the Allies forces to rally and drive them off.

The Italian Expeditionary Force had arrived a few months earlier to bolster the Anglo-French army sent to assist the Turks.the resistance of the Sardinian forces became a symbol of pride for the emerging Italian nation. The painting was purchased by Victor Emmanuel II. Today it is in the collection of the Gallerie di Piazza Scala in Milan.

== Bibliography ==
- Cipolla, Constantino. Il crinale dei crinali; La battaglia di Solferino e San Martino. Franco Angeli Edizioni, 2009.
- Raimondi, Andrea. The Invisible Bridge between the United Kingdom and Piedmont. Cambridge Scholars Publishing, 2019.
