= Attorney General Law =

Attorney General Law may refer to:

- Edward Law, 1st Baron Ellenborough (1750–1818), Attorney General for England and Wales
- Hugh Law (1818–1883), Attorney General for Ireland

== See also ==
- General Law (disambiguation)
