= John Hamilton Elphinstone Dalrymple =

British Army officer

General John Hamilton Elphinstone Dalrymple CB
- Born: 5 January 1819
- Died: 28 June 1888 (aged 69)
- Military career
- Allegiance: United Kingdom
- Branch: British Army
- Service years: 1837–1881
- Rank: General
- Unit: Scots Fusilier Guards
- Conflicts: Crimea
- Awards: CB

General John Hamilton Elphinstone Dalrymple, CB (5 January 1819 – 28 June 1888) was a senior British Army officer.

He was born the son of Sir Robert Dalrymple-Horn-Elphinstone of Horn and Westhall, 1st Baronet.

He joined the Scots Fusilier Guards in 1837 and was sent with the 1st Battalion to the Crimea, where he was wounded at the Battle of Alma in 1854. He was awarded the Order of the Medjidie in 1858. In 1861 the 2nd Battalion were sent to Canada with the Grenadier Guards to protect the border during the American Civil War. Dalrymple commanded the 2nd Battalion as they marched through New Brunswick after the Trent affair, a diplomatic incident in 1861 which threatened to bring about war between the United States and the United Kingdom.

In 1863 he was the Commanding Officer of the Scots Fusilier Guards for a year and retired on half pay the following year. In 1877 he was promoted to the rank of General and made CB.

He was appointed Colonel of 108th Foot from 1875 to 1880, when he transferred to be Colonel of the 71st Foot. When the 71st amalgamated with the 73rd Foot to form the Highland Light Infantry he became Colonel of the 1st Battalion of the HLI until his death. He retired completely in 1881.

He died in 1888. He had married Georgina Anne, eldest daughter of the late William Papwell Brigstocke and the widow of Francis Garden Campbell of Troup and Glenlyon. They had no children.

Military offices
Preceded by Sir George Cadogan	Colonel of the 71st (Highland) Regiment of Foot; 1880–1881	Regiment amalgamated to form Highland Light Infantry
New regiment	Colonel of the 1st Battalion, Highland Light Infantry; 1881–1888	Succeeded by William Kelty McLeod
