= George Cadogan =

British Army general

General Sir George Cadogan KCB (2 December 1814 – 27 January 1880) was a general in the British Army.

== Life ==
The fifth son of George Cadogan, 3rd Earl Cadogan and Honoria Louisa Blake (and thus the younger brother of the 4th earl). He joined the Grenadier Guards as a lieutenant in 1833, and rose by purchase to Lieutenant colonel by 1847, serving with them in the Crimean War as British Liaison officer to the Sardinian Expeditionary Corps and produced watercolours of scenes he witnessed during the war.

He served as Colonel to the 106th Regiment of Foot (Bombay Light Infantry) from 1870 to 1874 and then of the 71st (Highland) Regiment of Foot from 1874 to his death during which time he was promoted to full General (on 1 October 1877).

== Honours ==
- Knight in the Order of the Medjidie
- Commander (1st Class) of the Order of Saints Maurice and Lazarus
- Knight Commander of the Order of the Bath

== Marriages and issue ==
His first marriage was to Sophia Armstrong, daughter of colonel Thomas Armstrong, on 19 February 1846. They had 4 children:

- Mary Cadogan b. 8 Dec 1847, d. 15 Apr 1882
- Honoria Frances Cadogan b. 15 Jun 1849, d. c 1895
- Olivia Georgiana Cadogan+ b. 3 Sep 1850, d. 19 Jul 1910, married the Florentine patrician Lippo Neri, Conte Palagi del Palagio
- Sophia Isabella Harriet Cadogan b. 7 Jan 1853, d. 3 Feb 1928

His second marriage was to Emily Ashworth, daughter of Lt-Gen Sir Frederick Ashworth, on 23 July 1857. They had 1 child:

- Horace James Henry Cadogan b. 25 May 1862, d. 28 Apr 1932

Military offices
Preceded by Robert Law	Colonel of the 71st (Highland) Regiment of Foot; 1874–1880	Succeeded by John Hamilton Elphinstone Dalrymple
