= 71st (Highland) Regiment of Foot =

71st Regiment of Foot
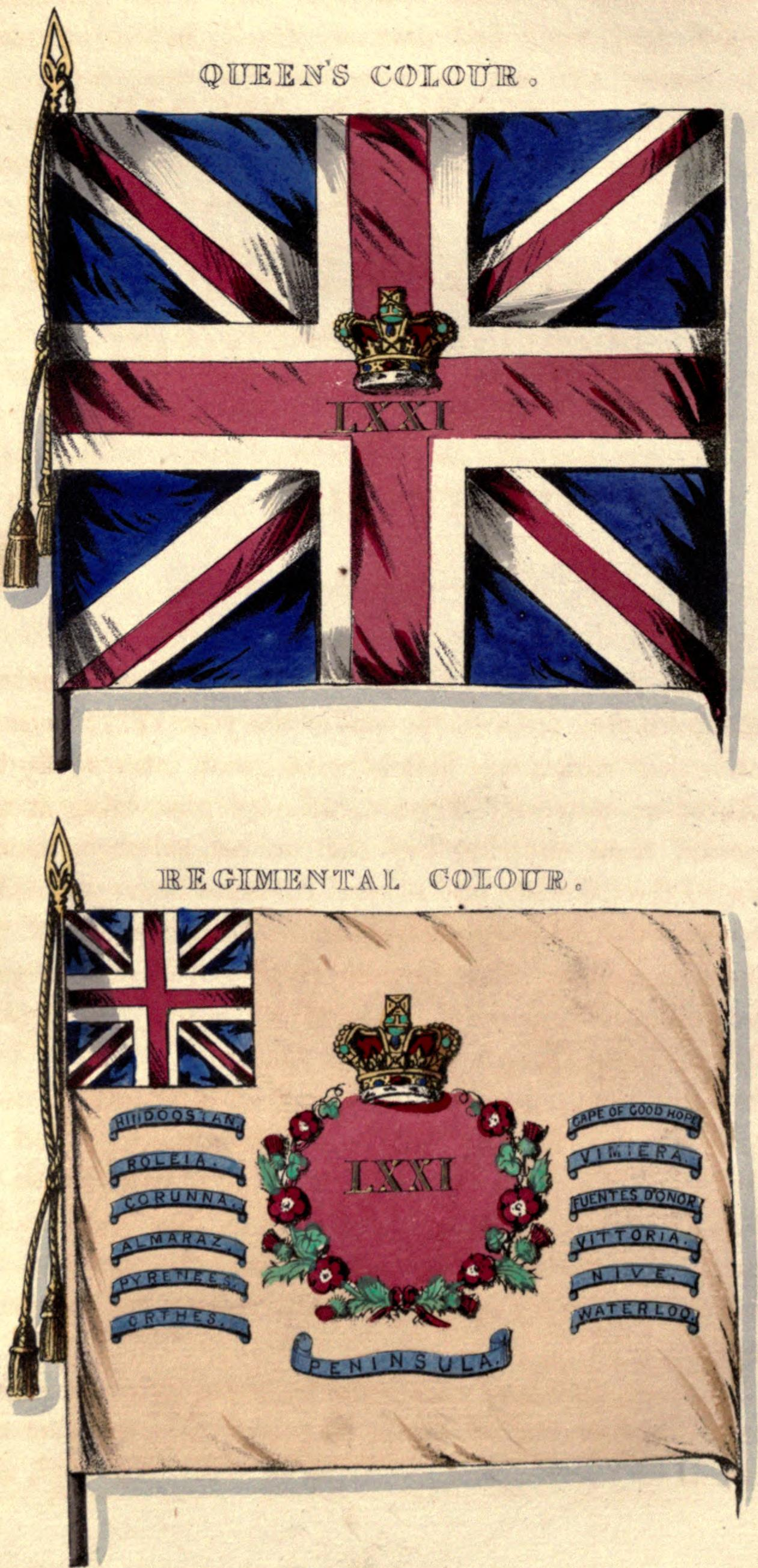
- 1852 illustration of the regimental colours
- Active: 19 December 1777 – 1 July 1881
- Country: Great Britain (1777–1800); United Kingdom (1801–1881)
- Branch: British Army
- Type: Infantry
- Role: Line infantry
- Size: Two battalions (1777–1783; 1804–1815); One battalion (1783–1804; 1815–1881)
- Garrison/HQ: Cameron Barracks, Inverness
- Nickname: The Assaye Regiment
- Engagements: Second Anglo-Mysore War; Third Anglo-Mysore War; French Revolutionary Wars; Napoleonic Wars; Crimean War; Indian Rebellion; Ambela Campaign

The 71st (Highland) Regiment of Foot was a line infantry regiment of the British Army. It was raised in 1777 as the 73rd (Highland) Regiment of Foot (MacLeod's Highlanders) before being renumbered as the 71st Regiment of Foot in 1786. Under the Childers Reforms it amalgamated with the 74th (Highland) Regiment of Foot to become the 1st Battalion, Highland Light Infantry in 1881.

== History ==
=== Formation ===
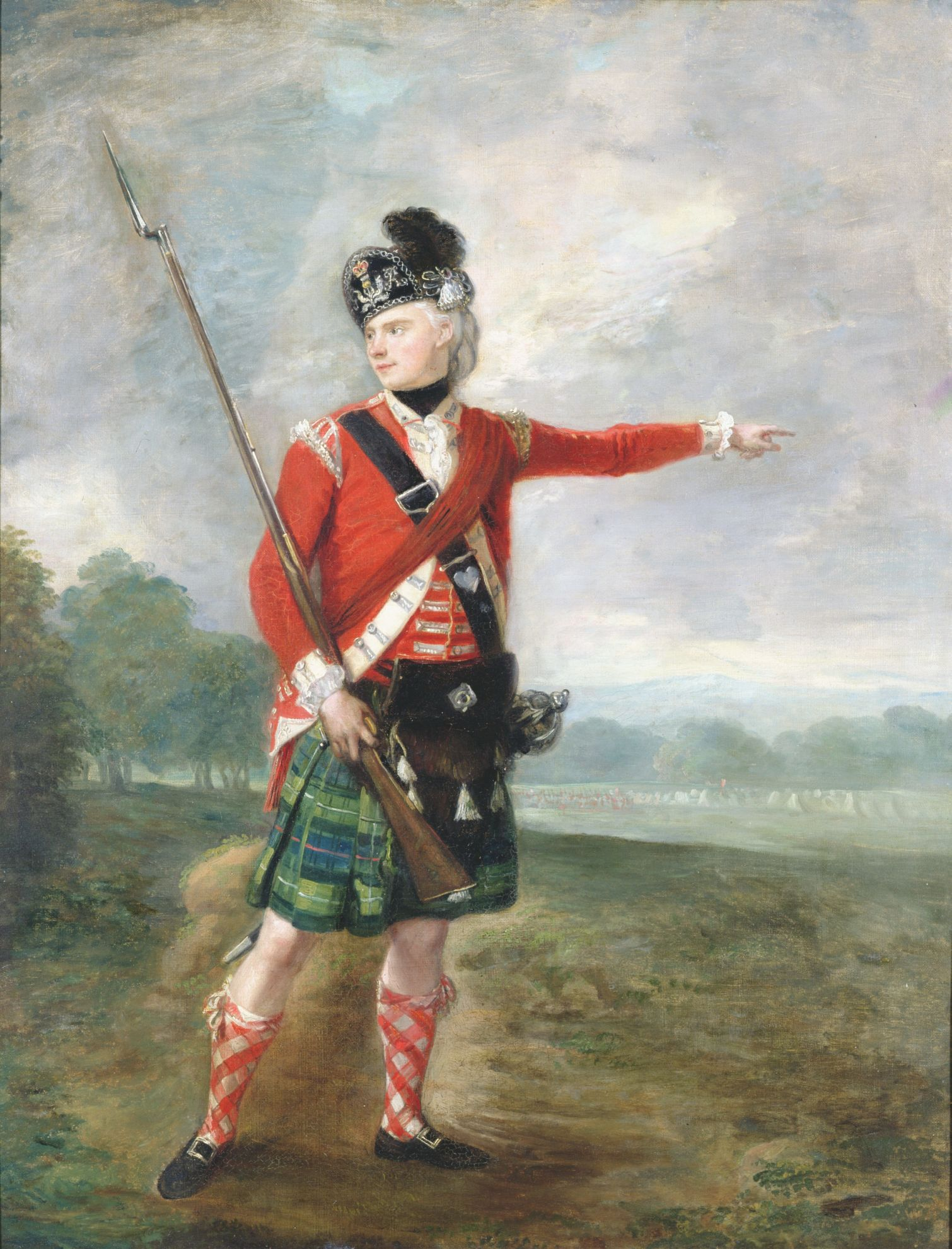
c. 1778–1779 portrait of a regimental officer

The regiment was raised at Elgin by Major-General John Mackenzie, Lord MacLeod as the 73rd (Highland) Regiment of Foot (MacLeod's Highlanders) from Highland clans in December 1777. A second battalion was formed in September 1778. The 1st battalion embarked for India in January 1779 and, having landed some troops at Gorée in Senegal on the way, reached Madras in January 1780. The flank companies were captured at Conjeveram in September 1780 during the Second Anglo-Mysore War. The battalion went on to take part in the Battle of Porto Novo in July 1781, the Battle of Pollilur in August 1781 and the Battle of Sholinghur in September 1781. After that the battalion took part in the siege of Cuddalore in June 1783.

Meanwhile, the 2nd battalion, commanded by Lieutenant-colonel George Mackenzie, embarked for the Mediterranean Sea and served as marines at the Battle of Cape St. Vincent in January 1780 before being landed at Gibraltar later that month and then taking part in the Great Siege of Gibraltar; the battalion was disbanded in 1783.

The regiment was redesignated as the 71st (Highland) Regiment of Foot (MacLeod's Highlanders) in 1786 and saw action at the siege of Seringapatam in February 1792 during the Third Anglo-Mysore War.

=== Napoleonic Wars ===
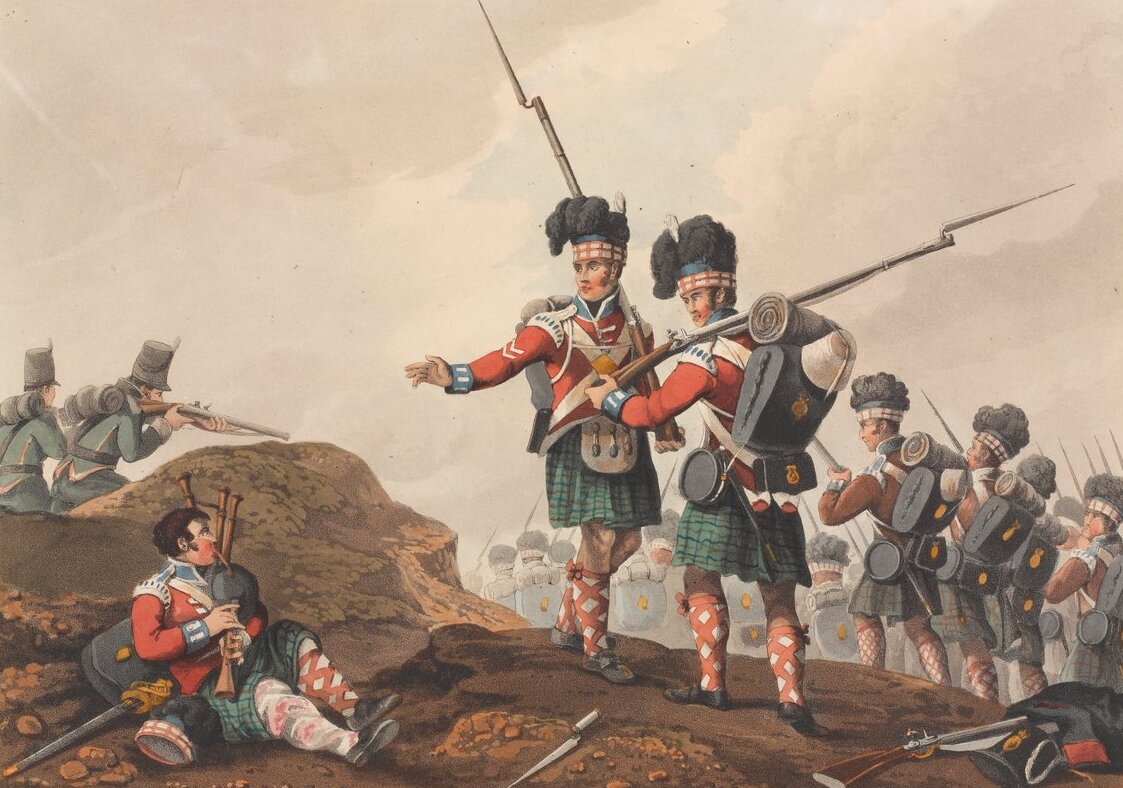
The regiment at the Battle of Vimiero

Remaining in India, the regiment fought at the siege of Pondicherry in August 1793 during the French Revolutionary Wars before transferring to Ceylon in August 1795 and returning to Scotland in August 1798.

A second battalion was again raised in October 1804 but remained in Scotland throughout the War. The 1st battalion embarked for the Cape of Good Hope in August 1805 and took part in the Battle of Blaauwberg in January 1806. The battalion then sailed for South America and took part in the disastrous expedition against Buenos Aires under Sir Home Popham. The battalion was taken prisoner and the Regimental Colours were captured. New colours were presented to the regiment by Lieutenant-General Sir John Floyd in April 1808.

The 1st battalion was reformed and embarked for Portugal in June 1808 for service in the Peninsular War. Renamed the 71st (Glasgow Highland) Regiment of Foot later that month, it saw action at the Battle of Roliça in August 1808, the Battle of Vimeiro later that month and Battle of Corunna in January 1809 before being evacuated from the Peninsula. In March 1809 it became a light infantry regiment, and the regiment next took part in the disastrous Walcheren Campaign in autumn 1809 before returning home and being renamed the 71st (Highland) Regiment of Foot (Light Infantry) in spring 1810.

The regiment returned to the peninsula in September 1810 and saw action at the Battle of Fuentes de Oñoro in May 1811, the Battle of Arroyo dos Molinos in October 1811 and the Battle of Almaraz in May 1812 as well as the Battle of Vitoria in June 1813. It then pursued the French Army into France and fought at the Battle of the Pyrenees in July 1813, the Battle of Nivelle in November 1813 and the Battle of the Nive in December 1813 as well as the Battle of Orthez in February 1814 and the Battle of Toulouse in April 1814. The battalion returned home in July 1814 and then embarked for Ostend in April 1815: it saw action as part of the 3rd Brigade at the Battle of Waterloo in June 1815.

=== The Victorian era ===
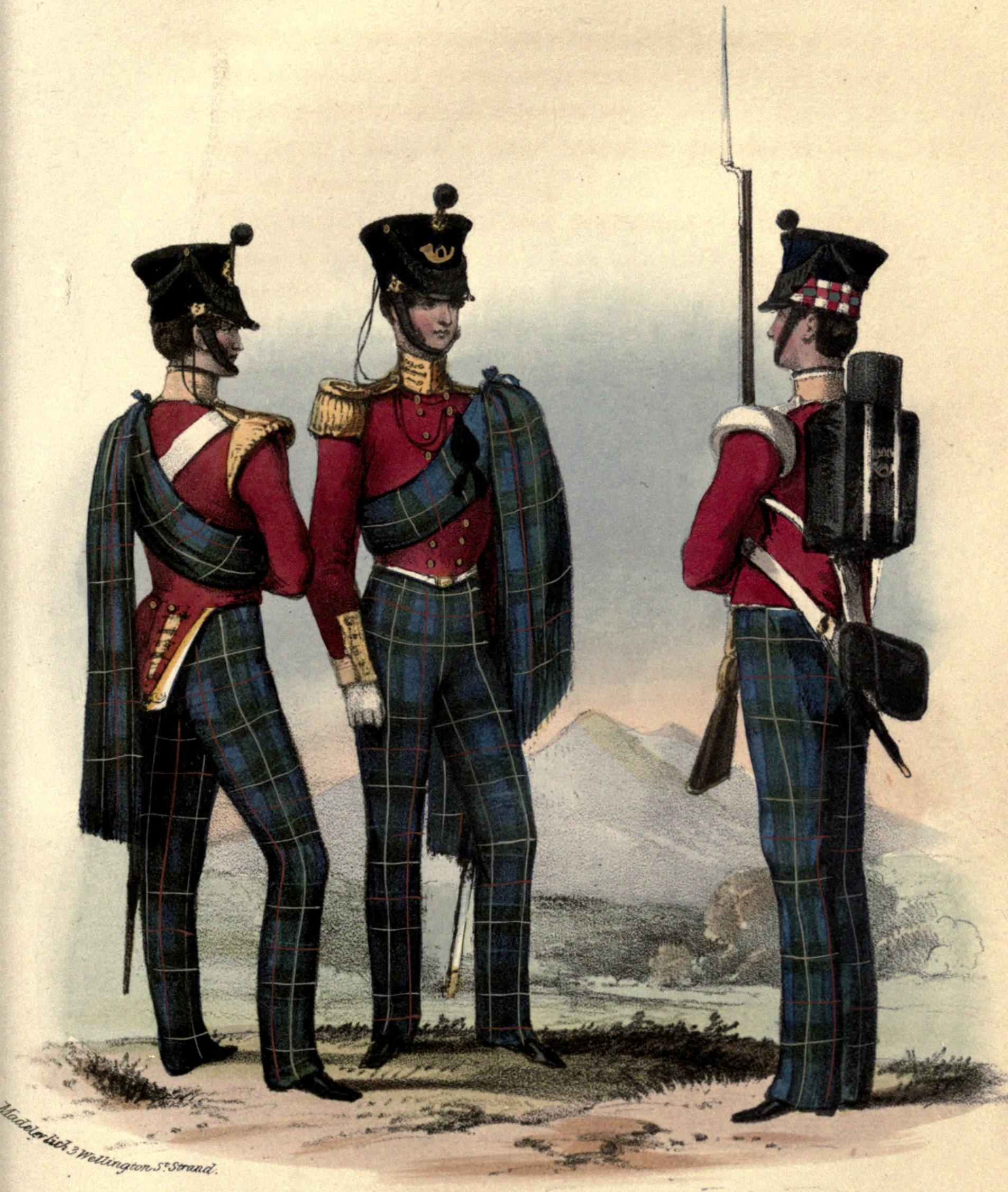
1852 illustration of the regimental uniform

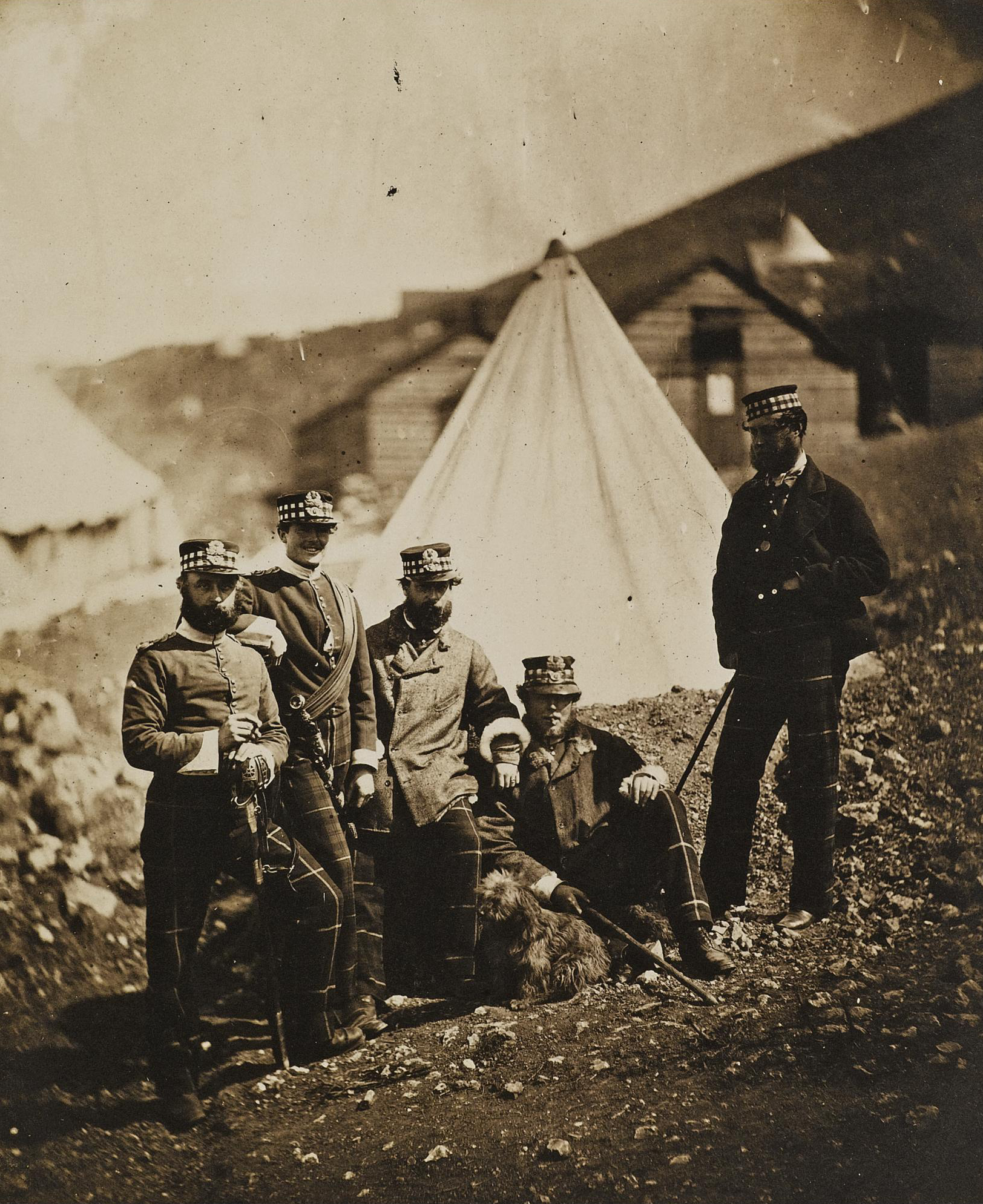
Regimental officers in Crimea, 1856

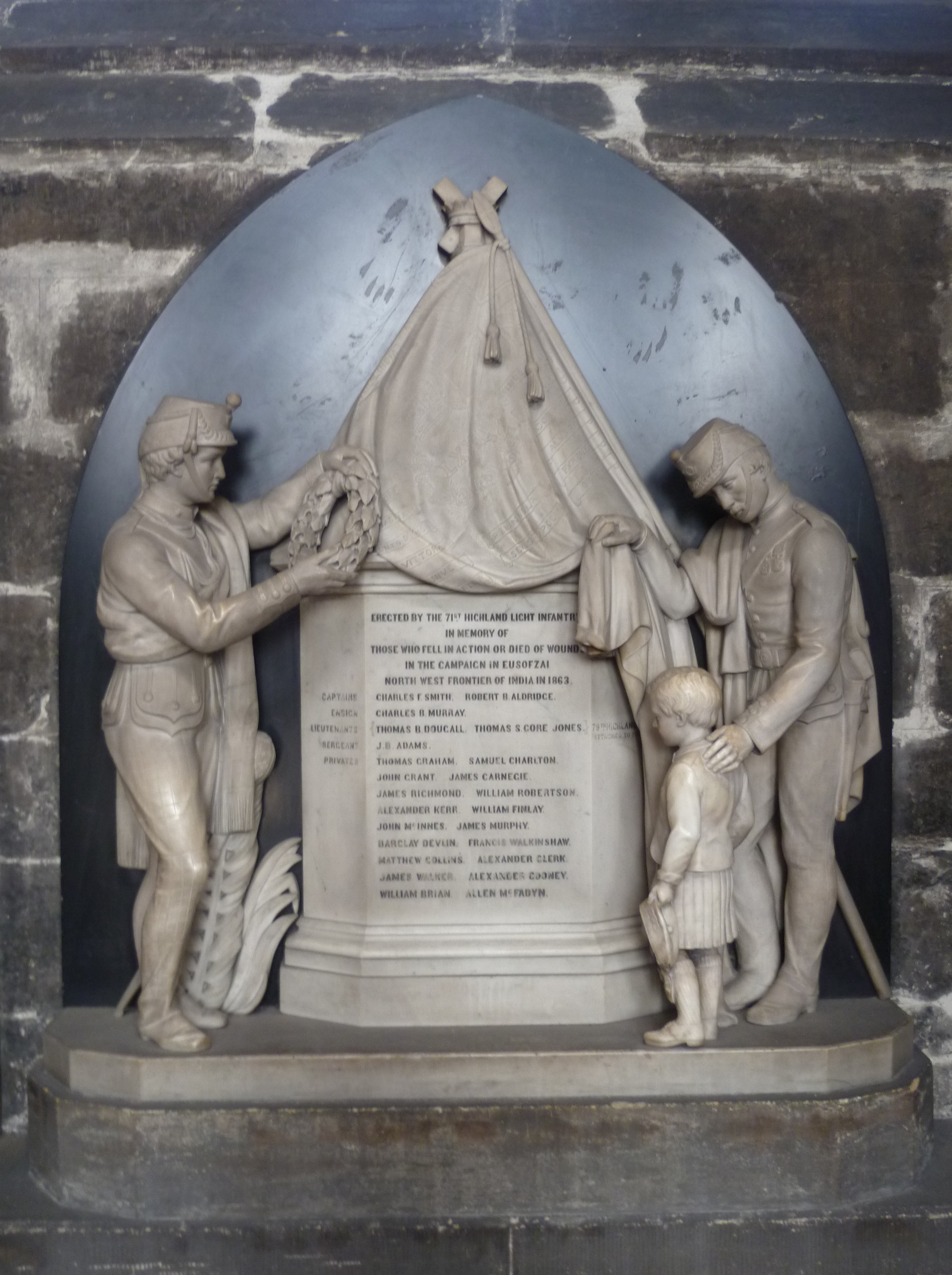
Memorial to regimental troops killed on the North-West Frontier in 1863 at Glasgow Cathedral

The regiment embarked for Canada in May 1824 and then moved on to Bermuda in October 1831 before returning to England in September 1834. It returned to Canada in April 1838 and then moved to Antigua in December 1844 before returning home in January 1847. The regiment embarked for Corfu in 1853 and then landed in the Crimea for service in the Crimean War: it saw action at the siege of Sevastopol in winter 1854. The regiment went on to India to help suppress the Indian Rebellion in 1857 and remained there for the Ambela Campaign in 1863. The regiment returned home in 1865 and then embarked for Gibraltar in 1868 before returning home again in 1880.

As part of the Cardwell Reforms of the 1870s, where single-battalion regiments were linked together to share a single depot and recruiting district in the United Kingdom, the 71st was linked with the 78th (Highlanders) Regiment of Foot, and assigned to district no. 55 at Cameron Barracks in Inverness. On 1 July 1881 the Childers Reforms came into effect and the regiment amalgamated with the 74th (Highland) Regiment of Foot to form the 1st and 2nd Battalions, Highland Light Infantry.

== Battle honours ==
Battle honours awarded to the regiment were:

- Hindoostan
- Cape of Good Hope 1806
- Peninsular War: Rolica, Vimiera, Corunna, Fuentes d'Onor, Almaraz, Vittoria, Pyrenees, Nive, Orthes, Peninsula
- Napoleonic Wars: Waterloo
- Crimean War: Sevastopol
- Central India

== Colonels ==
Colonels of the regiment were:

=== 73rd (Highland) Regiment of Foot (MacLeod's Highlanders) ===
- 1777–1789: Maj-Gen. John Mackenzie, Lord MacLeod

=== 71st (Highland) Regiment of Foot (MacLeod's Highlanders) – 1786 ===
- 1789–1803: Gen. Hon. William Gordon of Fyvie
- 1803–1809: Gen. Rt. Hon. Sir John Cradock, 1st Baron Howden

=== 71st (Glasgow Highland Light Infantry) Regiment of Foot – 1809 ===
- 1809–1824: Gen. Francis Dundas

=== 71st (Highland) Regiment of Foot (Light Infantry) – 1810 ===
- 1824–1829: Gen. Sir Gordon Drummond, GCB
- 1829–1838: Gen. Sir Colin Halkett, KCB, KCH
- 1838–1841: Lt-Gen. Sir Samuel Ford Whittingham, KCB, KCH
- 1841–1848: Lt-Gen. Sir Thomas Reynell, 6th Baronet, KCB
- 1848–1849: Lt-Gen. Sir Thomas Arbuthnot, KCB
- 1849–1857: Gen. Sir James Macdonell, GCB, KCH
- 1857–1863: Gen. Sir Thomas Erskine Napier, KCB
- 1863–1870: Gen. Hon. Charles Grey
- 1870–1874: Lt-Gen. Robert Law, KCB
- 1874–1880: Gen. Hon. Sir George Cadogan, KCB
- 1880–1881: Gen. John Hamilton Elphinstone Dalrymple, CB (to Highland Light Infantry)
- 1881: Regiment amalgamated the 74th (Highland) Regiment of Foot to form the Highland Light Infantry

== See also ==
- 78th Fraser Highlanders
- Highland Light Infantry

== Sources ==
- Cannon, Richard (1852). "Historical record of the seventy-first regiment, Highland Light Infantry, containing an account of its history from its formation in 1777 and of its subsequent services to 1852". Parker, Furnivall & Parker.
