= Osvaldo Bignami =

Italian painter (1856–1936)

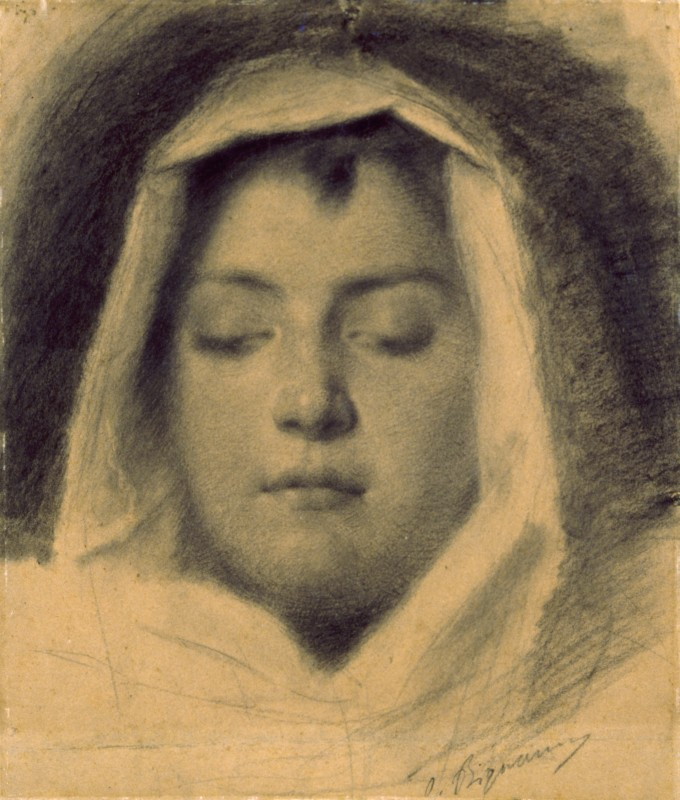
Studio di testa femminile, 1890 (Art collections of Fondazione Cariplo)

Osvaldo Bignami (1856–1936) was an Italian painter.

== Biography ==
Osvaldo Bignami was born in Lodi. He was apprenticed to a decorative artist in Milan, where he moved when he was in his twenties, and later enrolled at the Brera Academy. From his earliest work, he was oriented towards fresco decoration: this was the technique he used in the portraits of Masaccio and Giovanni Bellini (originally on the loggias of the Brera Palazzo in Milan and now lost) which won him the Mylius Prize in 1893 and 1894. He was a regular participant in the Brera exhibitions until 1900. His most noteworthy paintings were those with religious subjects, genre scenes and the portraits of Luigi Sabatelli, Giacomo Mantegazza and Enrico Zanoni (formerly in Milan, Società Artisti e Patriottica). In later years he devoted himself to the decorative painting of civic buildings, such as Teatro Fraschini in Pavia (1909), and religious buildings, such as some of the chapels at the Monumental Cemetery in Lodi (1902–1914) and the church of Santa Maria del Carmine in Milan (1904, 1909). He also experimented with lithography. He died in 1936 in Civate (Lecco).

== Other projects ==
Media related to Osvaldo Bignami at Wikimedia Commons
