= Gerolamo Induno =

Italian painter (1825–1890)

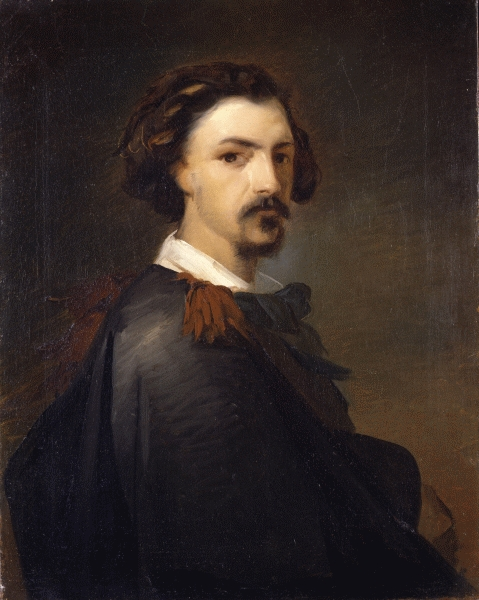
- Self-portrait (date unknown)
- Born: 13 December 1825; Milan, Kingdom of Lombardy–Venetia, Austrian Empire
- Died: 18 December 1890 (aged 65); Milan, Kingdom of Italy
- Occupation: painter
- Movement: Romanticism

Gerolamo Induno (13 December 1825 – 18 December 1890) was an Italian painter and soldier, best known for his military scenes. His older brother, Domenico, was also a well-known artist and they often worked together.

== Biography ==
He was born in Milan, where his father was a chef and butler at the Milanese court. He took his first formal art lessons at the Brera Academy, where he studied with Luigi Sabatelli from 1839 to 1846. His first exhibit was in 1845, composed of portraits and a scene from The Betrothed by Alessandro Manzoni (now lost).

In 1848, he and Domenico were participants in the Five Days of Milan and had to flee to avoid reprisals by the Austrian government. They spent two years in Ticino, then returned and settled in Florence. His brother went back to painting, but he enlisted in a volunteer regiment led by General Giacomo Medici and fought against the French during their siege of Rome. He also managed to produce numerous sketches of the war.

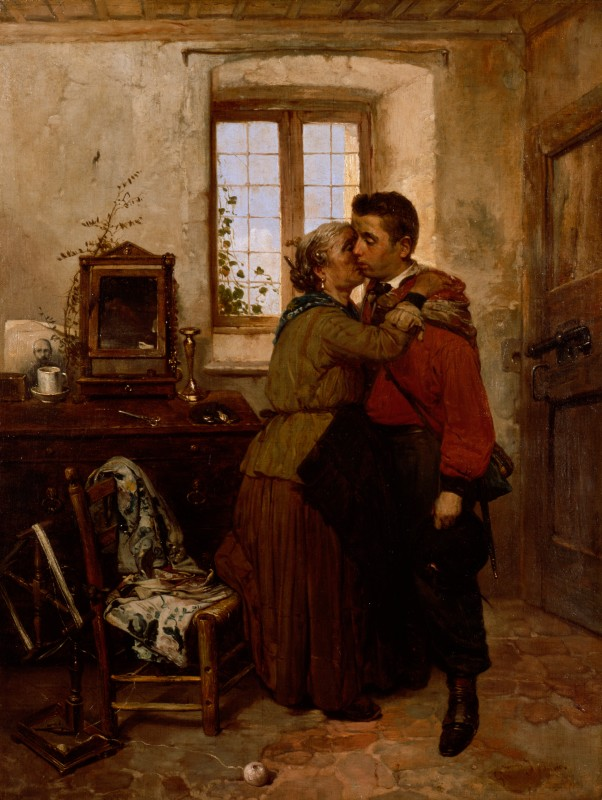
Departure of the Garibaldino, 1860 (Fondazione Cariplo)

While engaged in the defense of the Villa del Vascello, near Porta San Pancrazio, he was stabbed with several bayonets and seriously wounded while leading a charge. After a long recovery, he was able to return to Milan under the protection of Count Giulio Litta, a composer and avid art collector. Because of his injuries, he was exempt from being inducted into the Austrian army and went to work in his brother's studio. In the following years, he created many works based on the events of the Risorgimento, as well as genre works, influenced by his brother.

From 1854 to 1855, during the Crimean War, he was back in uniform; this time with the Bersaglieri of Alessandro La Marmora. Once again, he made numerous sketches that were turned into paintings and lithographs. These included a depiction of the Battle of the Chernaya that was purchased by King Victor Emmanuel II. Some of his works were exhibited at the Exposition Universelle in Paris. In 1859, despite lingering health issues, he enlisted in the Hunters of the Alps and came to be recognized by Garibaldi as the official painter of the Risorgimento, especially on matters of an official character. His genre scenes became almost entirely devoted to military themes.

During the 1860s, in addition to his patriotic canvases, he created some large decorative works; including an allegory on Rome and Florence for the new Milano Centrale railway station (now demolished), and a curtain depicting the "Plebiscite of Naples" for the theater in Gallarate. In 1861, he received a gold medal at an exhibition in Florence for his painting of the Battle of Magenta, but gave it up in solidarity with the painters who had been overlooked.

After unification had been achieved, his genre works tended to focus on scenes from the seventeenth century and he began to exhibit paintings on a wider variety of topics outside Italy, including Vienna (1873), Paris (1878), Antwerp (1885) and London (1888). His best-known work from this period is A Game of Chess, a scene from a play of the same name by Giuseppe Giacosa. He died in Milan in 1890, after a long illness. Among his pupils was Giacomo Mantegazza.

== Selected paintings ==
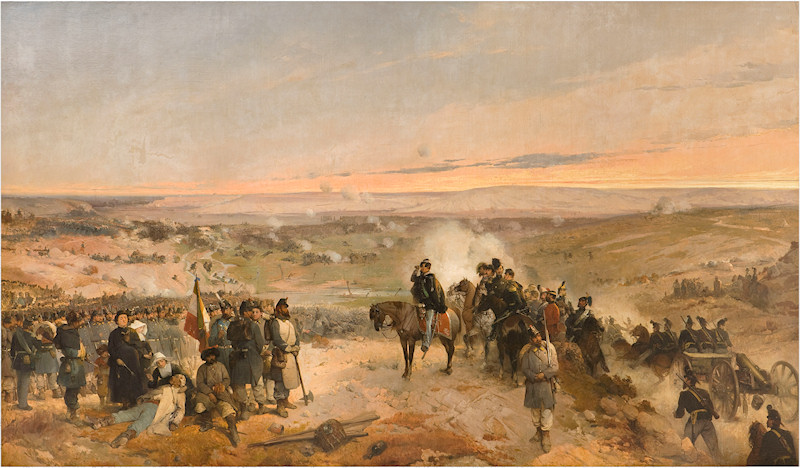
The Battle of the Chernaya, 1857

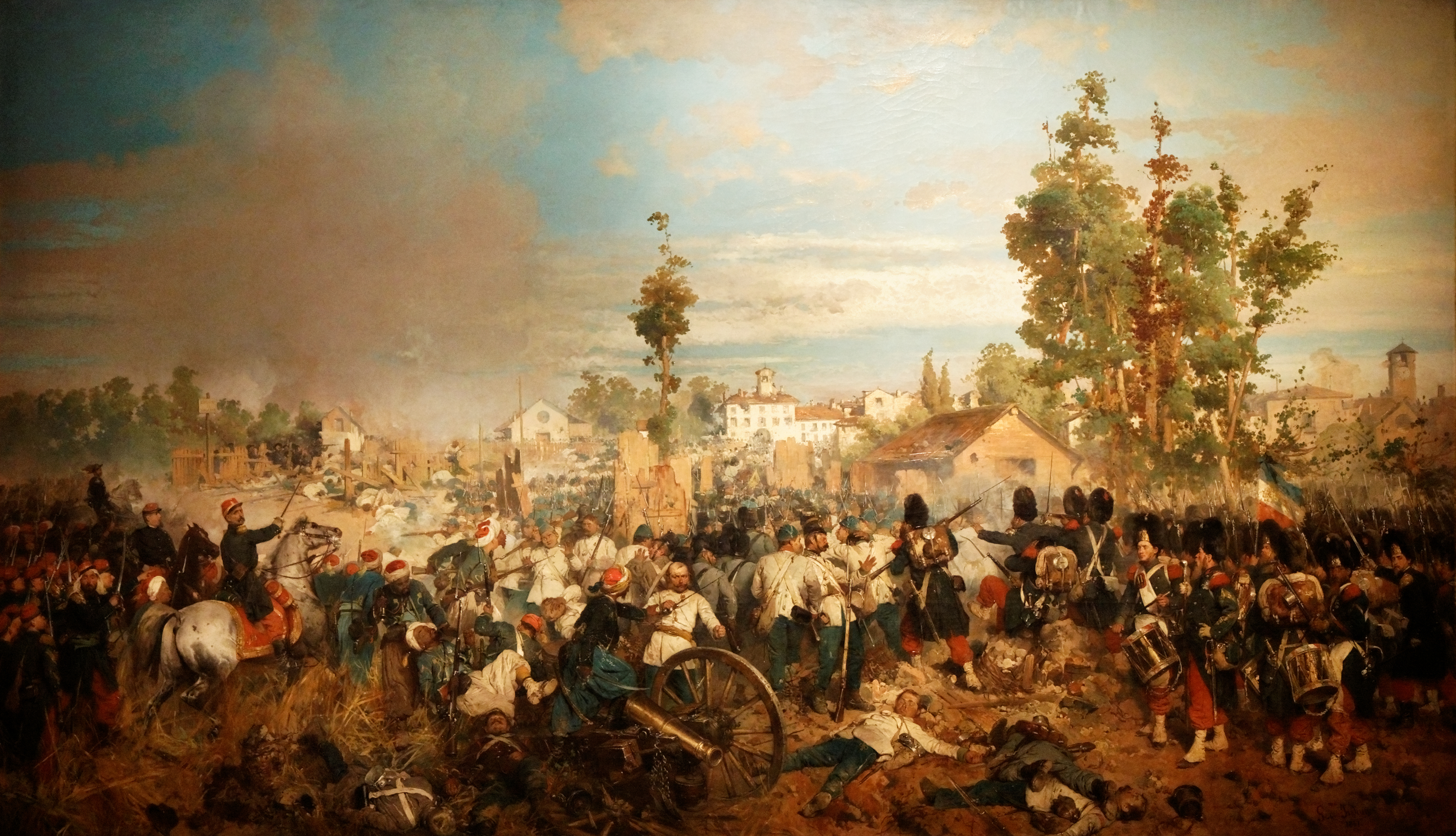
La battaglia di Magenta
(The Battle of Magenta), 1861

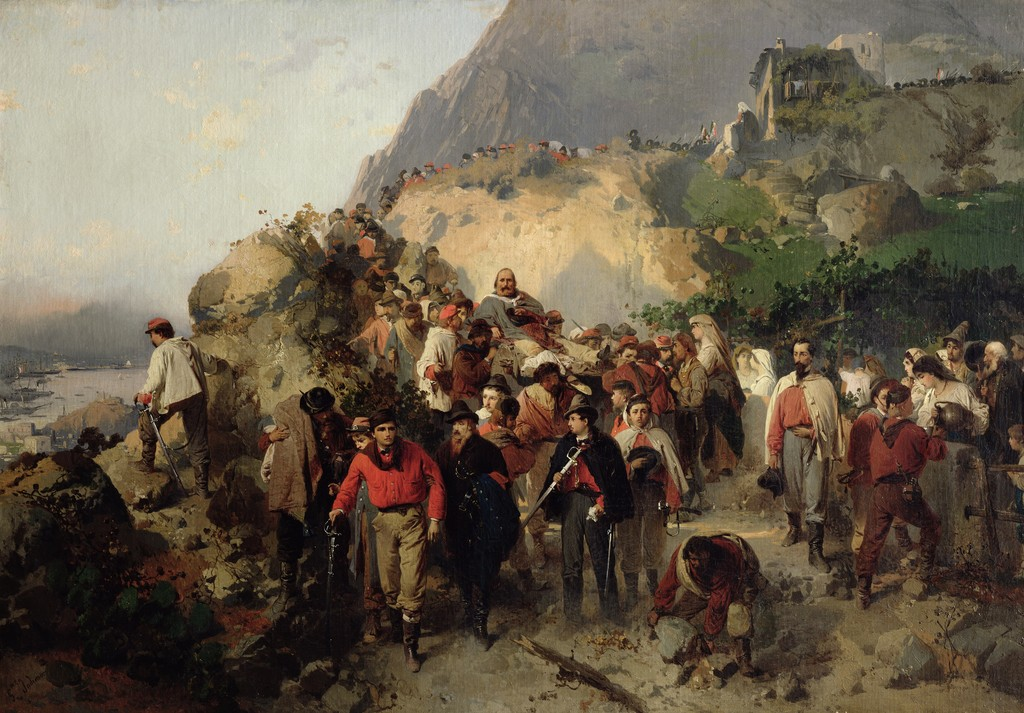
The Wounded Garibaldi after
the Battle of Aspromonte.

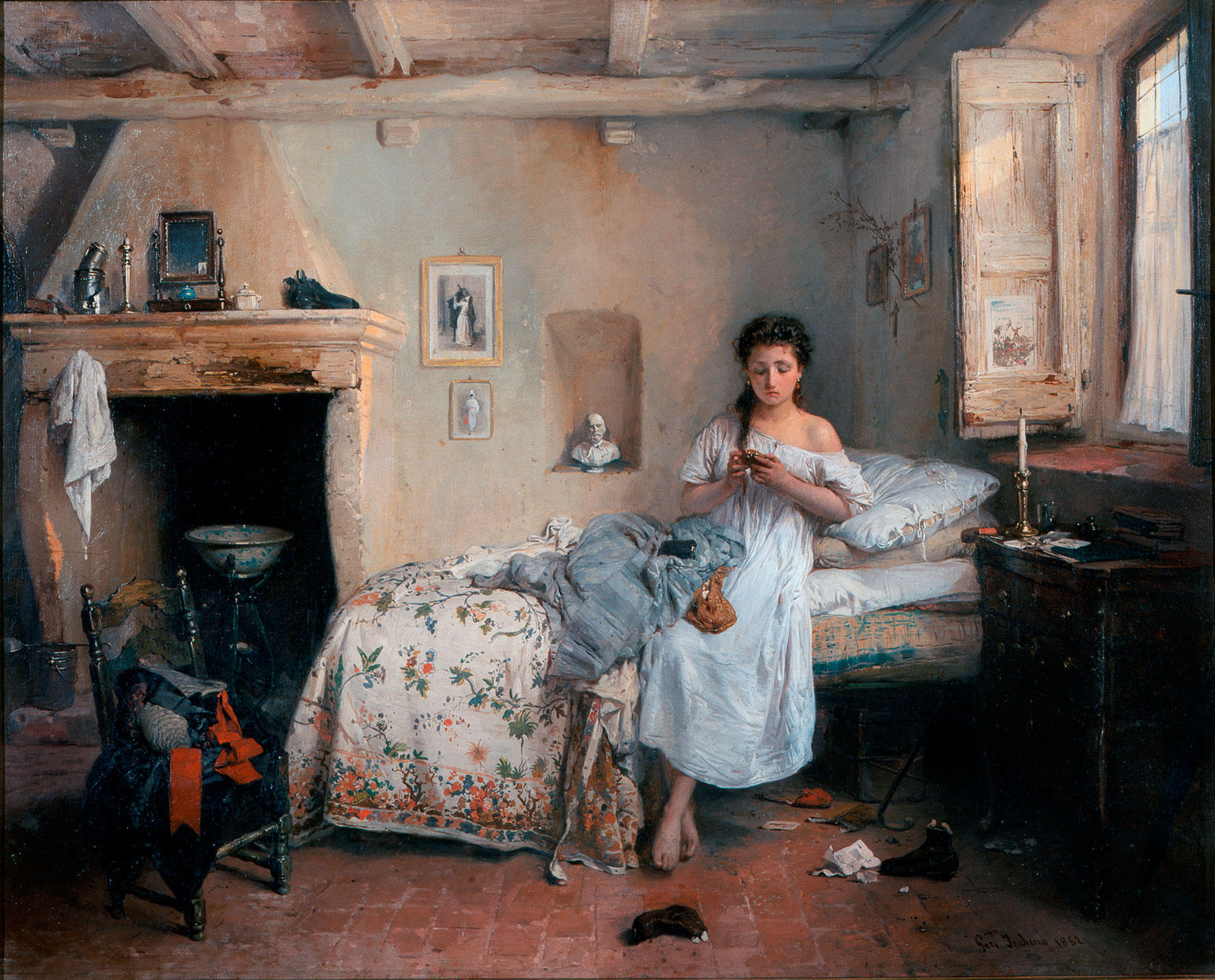
Triste Presentimento
(Doleful Premonition), 1862

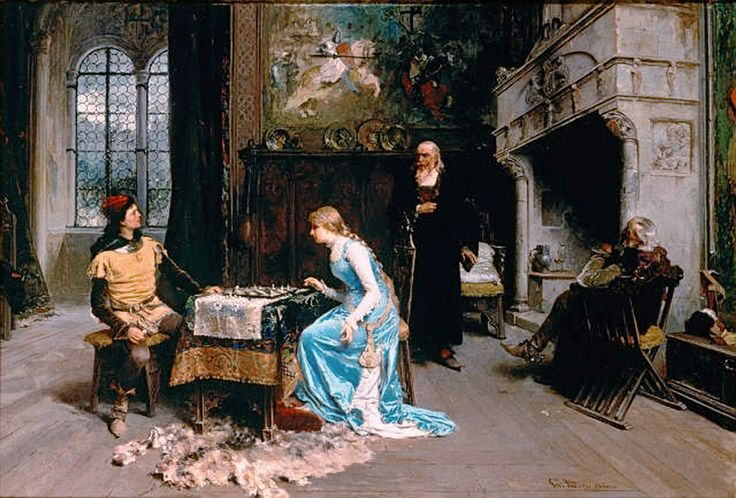
Una partita a scacchi
(A Game of Chess), 1881

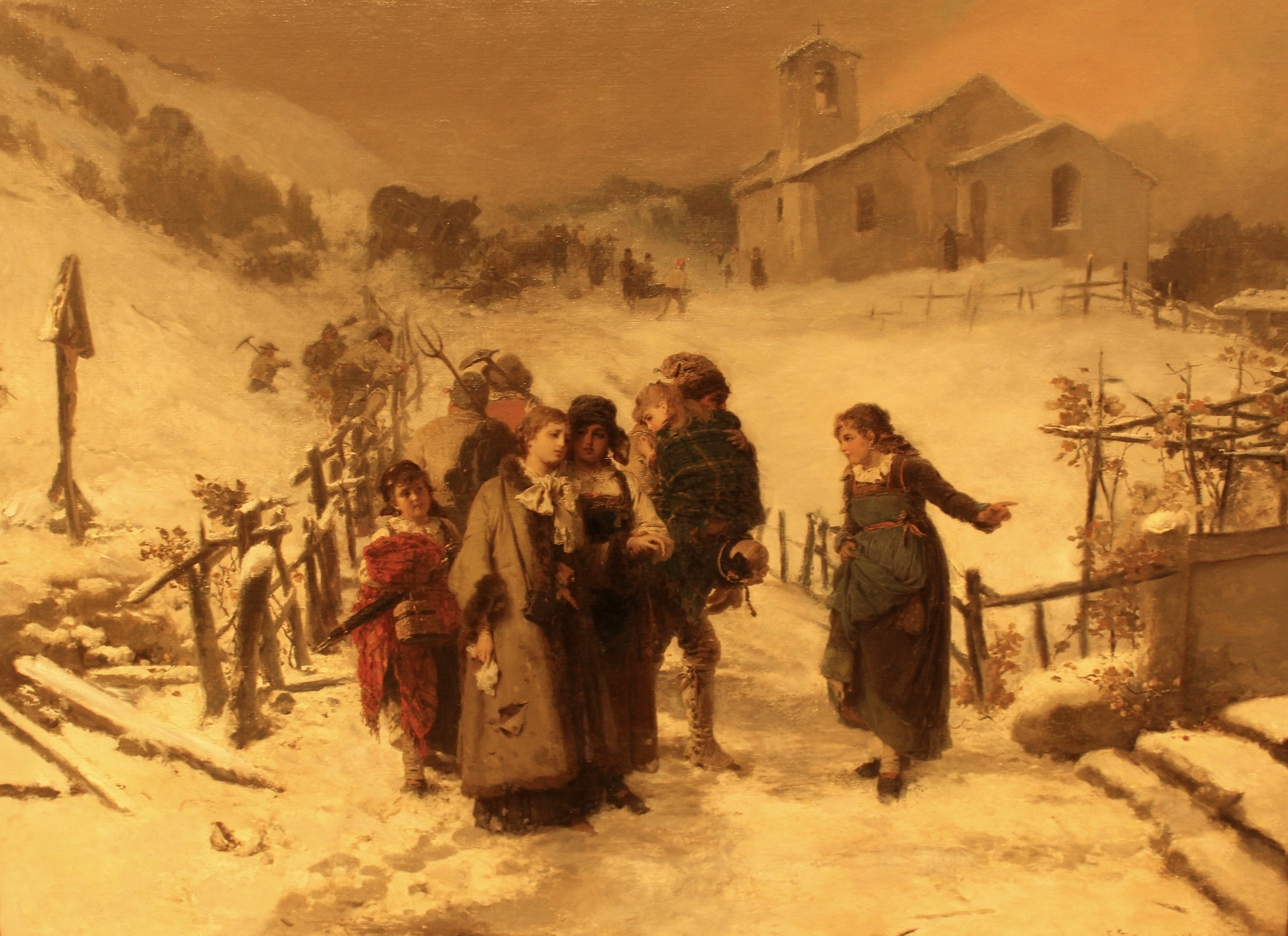
La Valanga
(The Avalanche), 1886
