= Crimean War order of battle: Kingdom of Sardinia =

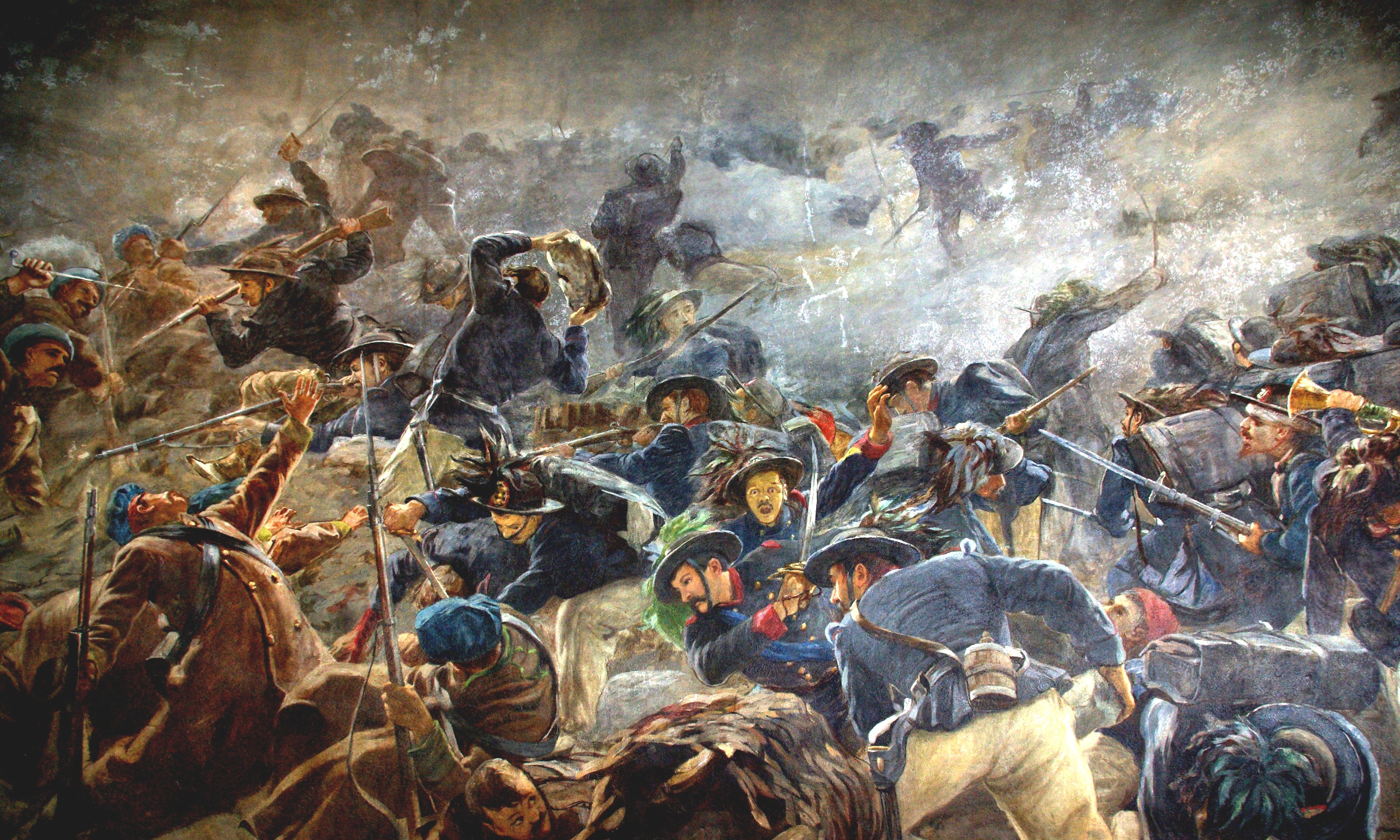
Bersaglieri halt the Russians during the Battle of the Chernaya.

The Kingdom of Sardinia sided with France, Britain and the Ottoman Empire against Russia during the Crimean War (October 1853 – February 1856) and sent an expeditionary force to the Crimea in 1855.

King Victor Emmanuel II and his prime minister, Count Camillo di Cavour, decided to side with Britain and France in order to gain favour in the eyes of those powers at the expense of Austria, which had refused to join the war against Russia. Sardinia committed a total of 18,000 troops under Lieutenant General Alfonso Ferrero La Marmora to the Crimean Campaign. Cavour aimed to gain the favour of the French regarding the issue of uniting Italy in a war against the Austrian Empire. The deployment of Italian troops to the Crimea, and the gallantry shown by them in the Battle of the Chernaya (16 August 1855) and in the siege of Sevastopol (1854–1855), allowed the Kingdom of Sardinia to attend the peace negotiatiatons for ending the war at the Congress of Paris (1856), where Cavour could raise the issue of the Risorgimento with the European great powers.

== Order of Battle of the Expeditionary Corps ==
A total of 18,061 men and 3,963 horses and mules embarked in April 1855 on British and Sardinian ships in the harbor of Genoa. While the infantry of the line and cavalry units were drawn from soldiers, who had volunteered for the expedition, the Bersaglieri, artillery and sapper troops were dispatched from their regular units. I.e. each of the army's 10 regular Bersaglieri battalions dispatched its first two companies for the expedition, while i.e. the 1st Battalion of the 2nd Provisional Regiment consisted of volunteers from the army's 3rd Line Infantry Regiment. The corps disembarked at Balaklava between 9 May and 14 May 1855.

=== Staff ===
- Expeditionary Corps Commander in Chief: Lieutenant General Alfonso Ferrero La Marmora
  - Chief of Staff: Lieutenant Colonel Petiti Di Roreto
  - Staff Major: Major Giuseppe Govone
  - Artillery Staff Major: Major Della Rovere
  - Commander, Artillery: Colonel Valfre Di Bonzo
  - Commander, Engineers: Major Staglieno
  - Commander, Bersaglieri: Lieutenant Colonel De Saint Pierre
  - Commander, Support Services: Major General Paolo Antonio de Cavero (until 17 August 1855, then handled by Major Della Rovere after, De Cavero took over the Reserve Brigade when its commander Major General Giorgio Ansaldi died)
  - Commander, Medical Services: Dr. Comisetti
  - Garrison Commander Balaklava: Lieutenant Colonel Della Chiesa Della Torre
  - Garrison Commander Constantinople: Lieutenant Colonel Paolucci
  - British Liaison officer: Colonel George Cadogan
  - French Liaison officer: Capitaine le Duc de Dino Talleyrand-Périgord

=== Staff Units ===
- Provisional Cavalry Regiment (Colonel De Savoiroux)
  - Regimental Staff, from the Regiment "Cavalleggeri di Alessandria"
  - 1st Squadron - 1st Squadron of the Regiment "Cavalleggeri di Novara"
  - 2nd Squadron - 1st Squadron of the Regiment "Cavalleggeri di Aosta"
  - 3rd Squadron - 1st Squadron of the Regiment "Cavalleggeri di Saluzzo"
  - 4th Squadron - 1st Squadron of the Regiment "Cavalleggeri di Monferrato"
  - 5th Squadron - 1st Squadron of the Regiment "Cavalleggeri di Alessandria"
- Provisional Fortress (Coastal) Artillery Battalion (Major Marabotto)
  - 1st Fortress Battery, from the 1st Fortress Artillery Brigade
  - 2nd Fortress Battery, from the 1st Fortress Artillery Brigade
  - 7th Fortress Battery, from the 2nd Fortress Artillery Brigade
  - 8th Fortress Battery, from the 2nd Fortress Artillery Brigade
- Mixed Artillery Workers Company, providing maintenance support for the corps' artillery guns (Captain Maraldi)
- Provisional Sappers Battalion (Major Serra) with troops from the Army's Sappers Regiment
  - 1st Sappers Company
  - 2nd Sappers Company
  - 6th Sappers Company
  - 7th Sappers Company
- Army Train, providing logistic support to the corps (Captain Raimondi)
  - 1st Army Train Company
  - 2nd Army Train Company
- Carabinieri Detachment, 50 men providing headquarters security

=== Combat Forces ===
- 1st Division (Lieutenant General Giovanni Durando)
  - II Brigade (Major General Manfredo Fanti)
    - 2nd Provisional Regiment (Lieutenant Colonel Beretta)
      - 1st Battalion, with troops from the 3rd Infantry Regiment (Brigade "Piemonte") (Major Gibbone)
      - 2nd Battalion, with troops from the 4th Infantry Regiment (Brigade "Piemonte") (Major Garavelli)
      - 3rd Battalion, with troops from the 5th Infantry Regiment (Brigade "Aosta") (Major Brignone)
      - 4th Battalion, with troops from the 6th Infantry Regiment (Brigade "Aosta") (Major Regis)
    - II Bersaglieri Battalion (Major Bonardelli)
      - 9th Bersaglieri Company, from the III Bersaglieri Battalion
      - 10th Bersaglieri Company, from the III Bersaglieri Battalion
      - 13th Bersaglieri Company, from the IV Bersaglieri Battalion
      - 14th Bersaglieri Company, from the IV Bersaglieri Battalion
    - 7th Field Battery with 6x guns (Captain Melli; from the Field Artillery Regiment)
  - III Brigade (Major General Enrico Cialdini)
    - 3rd Provisional Regiment (Lieutenant Colonel DeRossi)
      - 1st Battalion, with troops from the 7th Infantry Regiment (Brigade "Cuneo") (Major Longoni)
      - 2nd Battalion, with troops from the 8th Infantry Regiment (Brigade "Cuneo") (Major Corte)
      - 3rd Battalion, with troops from the 13th Infantry Regiment (Brigade "Pinerolo") (Major Baleno)
      - 4th Battalion, with troops from the 14th Infantry Regiment (Brigade "Pinerolo") (Major Berberis)
    - III Bersaglieri Battalion (Major Bertaldi)
      - 17th Bersaglieri Company, from the V Bersaglieri Battalion
      - 18th Bersaglieri Company, from the V Bersaglieri Battalion
      - 21st Bersaglieri Company, from the VI Bersaglieri Battalion
      - 22nd Bersaglieri Company, from the VI Bersaglieri Battalion
    - 10th Field Battery with 6x guns (Captain Quaglia; from the Field Artillery Regiment)
- 2nd Division (Lieutenant General Ardigo Trotti, after the division's first commander Lieutenant General Alessandro Ferrero La Marmora had died on 7 June 1855)
  - IV Brigade (Major General Rodolfo Gabrielli di Montevecchio)
    - 4th Provisional Regiment (Lieutenant Colonel Caminati)
      - 1st Battalion, with troops from the 9th Infantry Regiment (Brigade "Regina") (Major Durandi)
      - 2nd Battalion, with troops from the 10th Infantry Regiment (Brigade "Regina") (Major Solaro)
      - 3rd Battalion, with troops from the 15th Infantry Regiment (Brigade "Savona") (Major Valacca)
      - 4th Battalion, with troops from the 16th Infantry Regiment (Brigade "Savona") (Major Corporandi)
    - IV Bersaglieri Battalion (Major Della Chiesa)
      - 25th Bersaglieri Company, from the VII Bersaglieri Battalion
      - 26th Bersaglieri Company, from the VII Bersaglieri Battalion
      - 29th Bersaglieri Company, from the VIII Bersaglieri Battalion
      - 30th Bersaglieri Company, from the VIII Bersaglieri Battalion
    - 13th Field Battery with 6x guns (Captain Ricotti-Magnan; from the Field Artillery Regiment)
  - V Brigade (Major General Filiberto Mollard)
    - 5th Provisional Regiment (Lieutenant Colonel Leotardi)
      - 1st Battalion, with troops from the 11th Infantry Regiment (Brigade "Casale") (Major Alberti)
      - 2nd Battalion, with troops from the 12th Infantry Regiment (Brigade "Casale") (Major Bigaro Di Vische)
      - 3rd Battalion, with troops from the 17th Infantry Regiment (Brigade "Acqui") (Major Ferrero)
      - 4th Battalion, with troops from the 18th Infantry Regiment (Brigade "Acqui") (Major Cadorna)
    - V Bersaglieri Battalion (Major Cassinis)
      - 33rd Bersaglieri Company, from the IX Bersaglieri Battalion
      - 34th Bersaglieri Company, from the IX Bersaglieri Battalion
      - 37th Bersaglieri Company, from the X Bersaglieri Battalion
      - 38th Bersaglieri Company, from the X Bersaglieri Battalion
    - 16th Field Battery with 6x guns (Major Baudi di Vesme; from the Field Artillery Regiment)

=== Reserve Forces ===
- Reserve Brigade (Major General Paolo Antonio de Cavero)
  - 1st Provisional Regiment (Colonel Giustiniani)
    - 1st Battalion, with troops from the 1st Grenadier Regiment (Brigade "Granatieri di Sardegna") (Major Gozani Di Treville)
    - 2nd Battalion, with troops from the 2nd Grenadier Regiment (Brigade "Granatieri di Sardegna") (Major Incisa Di San Stefano)
    - 3rd Battalion, with troops from the 1st Infantry Regiment (Brigade "Savoia") (Major De Faverges)
    - 4th Battalion, with troops from the 2nd Infantry Regiment (Brigade "Savoia") (Major De Courten)
  - I Bersaglieri Battalion (Major Ricadati Di Primeglio)
    - 1st Bersaglieri Company from the I Bersaglieri Battalion
    - 2nd Bersaglieri Company from the I Bersaglieri Battalion
    - 5th Bersaglieri Company from the II Bersaglieri Battalion
    - 6th Bersaglieri Company from the II Bersaglieri Battalion
- Reserve Artillery Brigade (Major Campana)
  - 1st Field Artillery Battery with 6x guns (Captain Celesia; from the Field Artillery Regiment)
  - 4th Field Artillery Battery with 6x guns (Captain Avogadro Di Valdengo; from the Field Artillery Regiment)

== Naval Division ==
The naval division consisted of 11 warships and 7 transport ships, with 2,574 men and 126 naval guns.

=== Staff ===
- Naval Division Commander: 1st rank Ship-of-the-line Captain Orazio Di Negro
  - Chief of Staff: Corvette Captain Boyl di Putifigari
  - Flag Adjutant: 1st rank Ship-of-the-line Lieutenant Pagliacciu Suni
  - Harbour Commander Balaklava, 1st rank Ship-of-the-line Lieutenant Ferrero La Marmora
  - Harbour Commander Constantinople Major De Rey

=== Combat ships ===
Combat ships:

- "Carlo Alberto" steam frigate of the 1st rank and flagship (1st rank Ship-of-the-line Captain Ceva di Nuceto)
- "Governolo" steam frigate of the 2nd rank (1st rank Ship-of-the-line Captain Albini)
- "Costituzione" steam frigate of the 2nd rank (2nd rank Ship-of-the-line Captain Ineisa di Camerano)
- "Tripoli" steam corvette of the 2nd rank (Corvette Captain Lomaglio)
- "Monzambano" steam corvette of the 2nd rank (Corvette Captain De Viry)
- "Malfatano" steam corvette of the 2nd rank (Corvette Captain Provana del Sabbione)
- "Authion" steam aviso (1st rank Ship-of-the-line Lieutenant Giraud)
- "Gulnara" steam avisio (1st rank Ship-of-the-line Lieutenant Sartorio)
- "Varo" armed transport ship (Ship-of-the-line Lieutenant Isola)
- "Dora" armed transport ship (Ship-of-the-line Lieutenant Riboty)
- "Tanaro" armed transport ship

=== Transport ships ===
Transport ships:

- "San Michele" (Frigate Captain Riccardi di Netro)
- "Beroldo" (Frigate Captain Michelotti)
- "De Geneys" (Frigate Captain Galli della Mantica)
- "Euridice" (Frigate Captain Teulada)
- "San Giovanni" (Corvette Captain Wright)
- "Aurora" (Ship-of-the-line Lieutenant Lampo)
- "Azzardoso" transport brigantine (Chief 1st Class Brun)
