= Robert Law (British Army officer) =

British Army officer and colonial administrator

Lieutenant-General Robert Law KH
- Born: c. 1788
- Died: 16 May 1874
- Military career
- Allegiance: United Kingdom
- Branch: British Army
- Service years: 1809–1874
- Rank: Lieutenant-General
- Conflicts: Napoleonic Wars; Walcheren Campaign; Peninsular War; Battle of Corunna; Battle of Sobral; Battle of the Pyrenees; Battle of Nivelle; Battle of the Nive; Battle of Garris; Battle of Orthez; Action at Tarbes (WIA); Hundred Days; Battle of Waterloo (WIA)
- Awards: Military General Service Medal
- Memorials: St. Michan's Church, Dublin

Lieutenant-General Robert Law KH (c. 1788 – 16 May 1874) was a British Army officer and colonial administrator for the colony of Newfoundland.

Law was commissioned into the 71st Foot in 1809. He was promoted lieutenant in 1811 and captain in 1821. In 1822 he transferred to the 1st West India Regiment. He later transferred to the 83rd Foot and in 1824 to the Ceylon Regiment. In 1834 he was promoted major and transferred to the Royal Newfoundland Veteran Companies, also being appointed commander of the garrison in Newfoundland. His responsibilities also required him to play a political role between the departure of Governor John Harvey and the arrival of Sir John Gaspar Le Marchant where he assumed the role as colonial administrator. Law dispensed relief to the victims of the 1846 fire at St. John's.

He was promoted lieutenant-colonel in 1844, colonel in 1854, major-general in 1859, and lieutenant-general in 1868. From 1870 to his death in 1874 he was colonel of the 71st (Highland) Regiment of Foot.

== See also ==
- Governors of Newfoundland
- List of people of Newfoundland and Labrador

Military offices
| Preceded by Botet Trydell | Colonel of the 2nd West India Regiment; 1864–1870 | Succeeded by Brooke John Taylor |
| Preceded by Charles Grey | Colonel of the 71st (Highland) Regiment of Foot; 1870–1874 | Succeeded by Sir George Cadogan |
