= Giacomo Mantegazza =

Italian painter

Giacomo Mantegazza (1851 – January 25, 1920) was an Italian painter, known for painting Genre and Orientalist themes.

He was born in Saronno, then in the Austrian Empire. He trained under Gerolamo Induno and Giuseppe Bertini. He was made an honorary member of the Brera Academy. He died in Cernobbio.

== Gallery ==
Paintings by Mantegazza

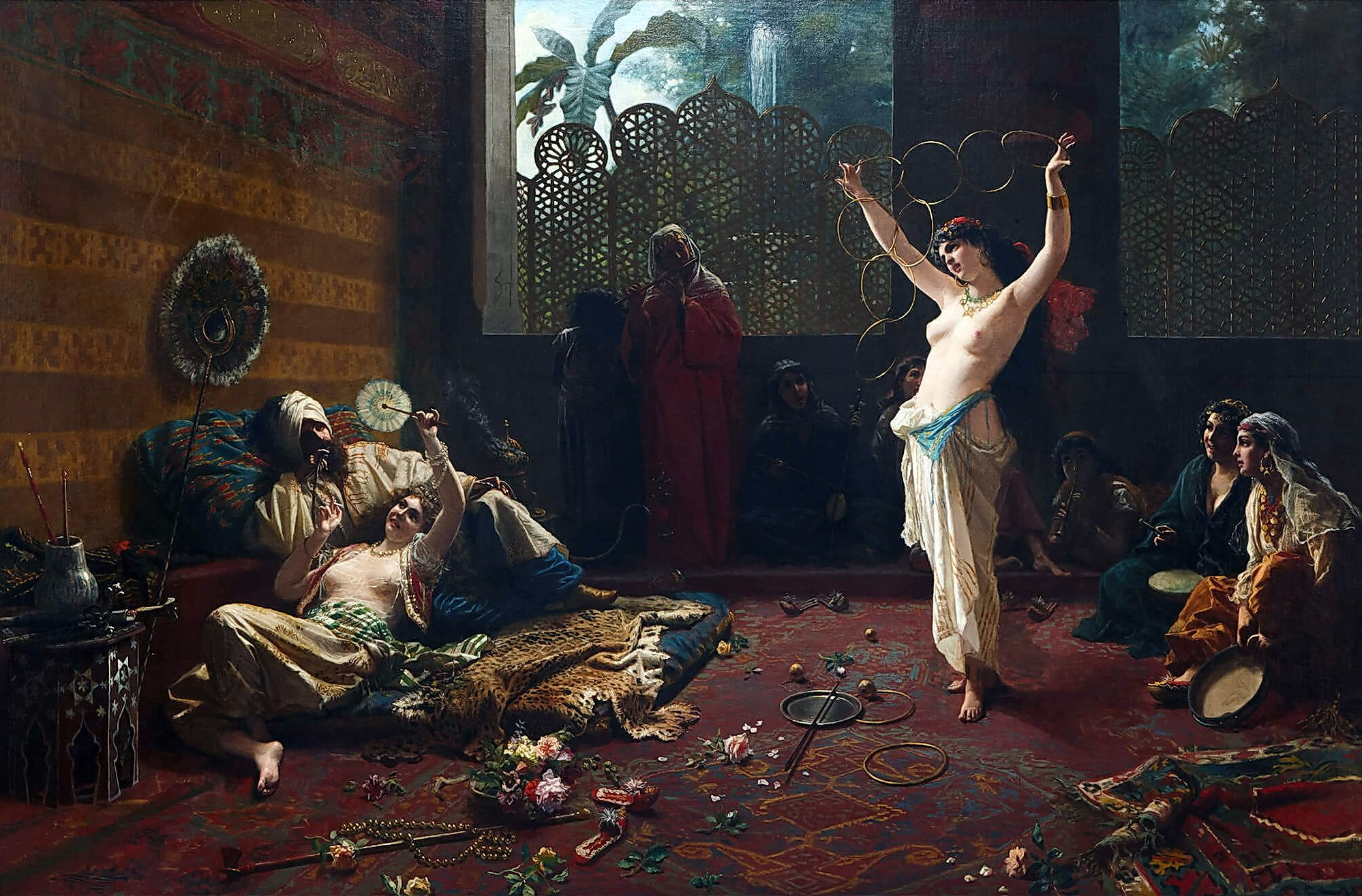
Une soirée oisive au sérail

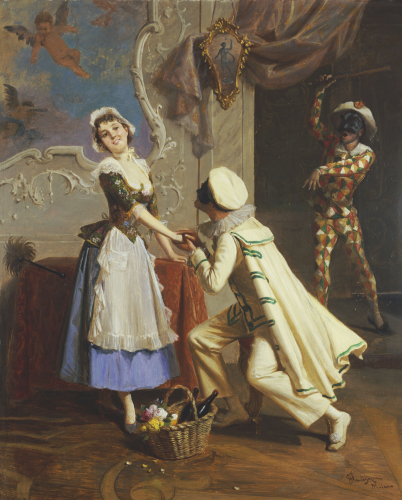
The Proposal

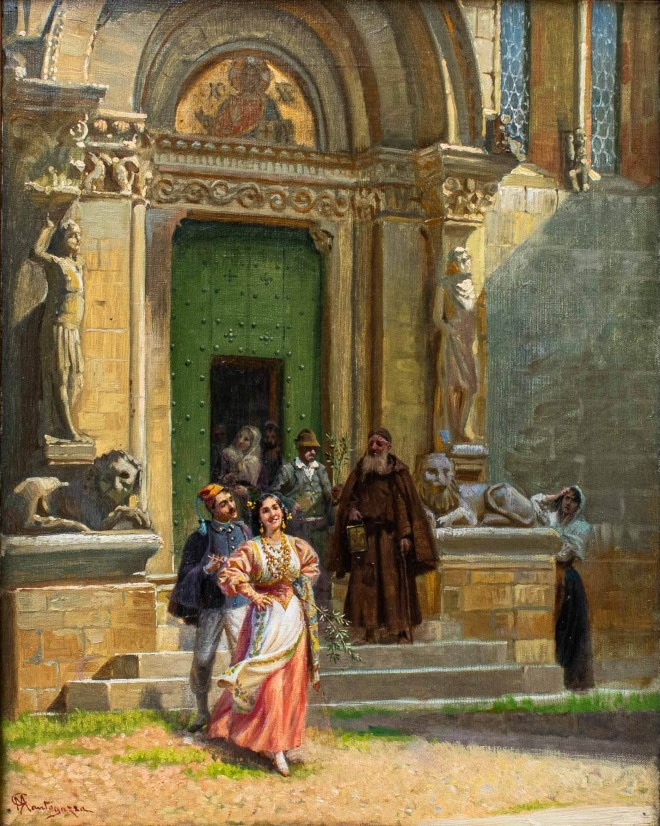
At the exit of the Church

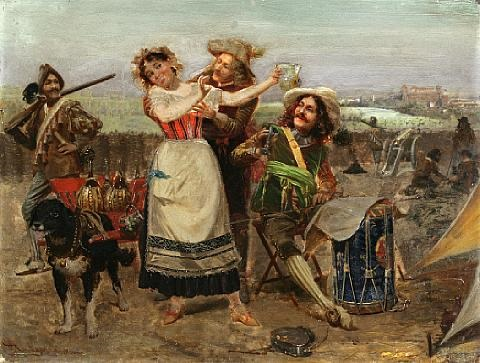
Welcome Advance

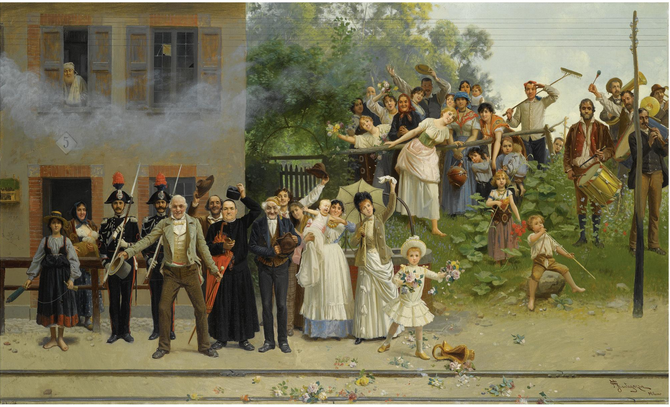
The King Passes

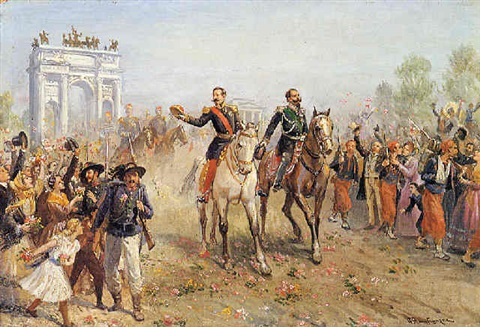
Victor Emanuele II and Napoleon III enter Milan

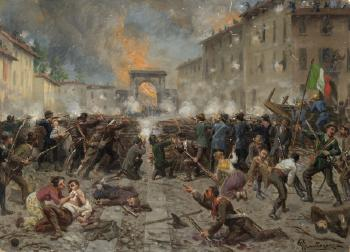
Mobile Barricades at Porta Tosa
